= Aleutian Airways =

Airline serving Western Alaska operating out of Anchorage

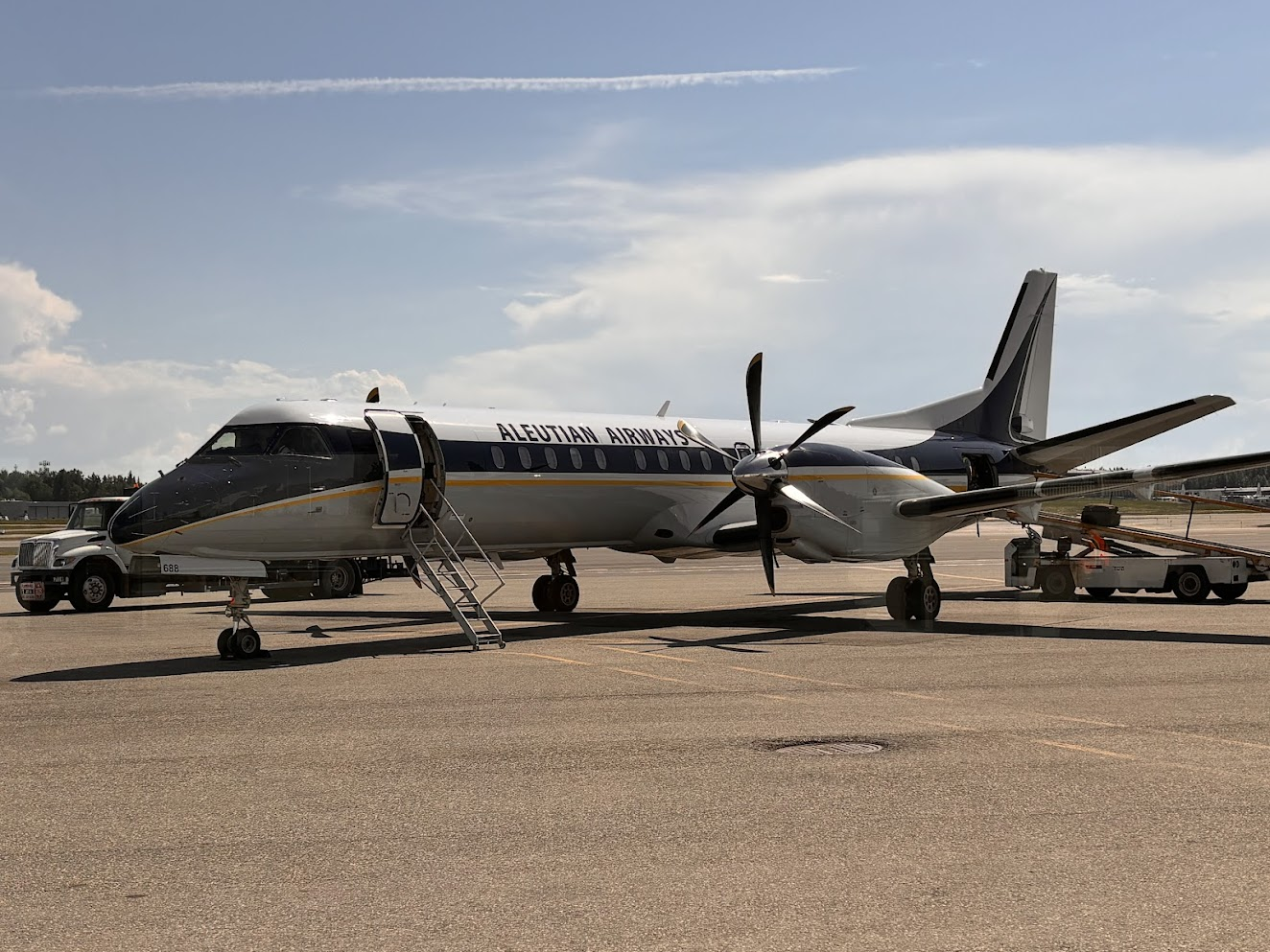
- Aleutian Airways Saab 2000 at Anchorage
IATA	ICAO	Call sign
VC	SRY	STINGRAY
- Commenced operations: November 16, 2022; 3 years ago
- Operating bases: Ted Stevens Anchorage International Airport
- Fleet size: 5
- Destinations: 7
- Parent company: Joint venture between Wexford Capital, Mckinley Alaska Private Investment, and Alaska Seaplanes.
- Website: flyaleutian.com

Aleutian Airways is a joint venture between Sterling Airways and Alaska Seaplanes which offers scheduled flights between Anchorage and Southwest Alaska.

== History ==
The routes served by Aleutian Airways were traditionally served by PenAir, which was purchased out of bankruptcy by Ravn Air group in 2018. Following a collapse in air travel caused by the COVID-19 pandemic, Ravn Alaska filed for bankruptcy, and the operating certificate for PenAir was again put up for sale. Alaska Seaplanes, which had been outbid by Ravn for PenAir in 2018 was again outbid for PenAir.

Alaska Seaplanes then entered into a joint venture with Sterling Airways to offer service to Southwest Alaska under the name Aleutian Airways. The airline utilizes ex-PenAir Saab 2000 aircraft, flown by ex-PenAir staff.

Aleutian Airways began scheduled service with a flight from Anchorage to Dutch Harbor on November 16th, 2022.

== Corporate structure ==
Aleutian Airways is a joint venture between Wexford Capital, Mckinley Alaska Private Investment, and FAA certified air carriers Air Excursions and Kalinin Aviation d/b/a Alaska Seaplanes. Alaska Seaplanes operates the back-office and ticket sales, while Wexford subsidiary Sterling Airways is responsible for the maintenance and operation of the aircraft.

=== Sterling Airways ===
Wexford Capital purchased Florida-based ViaAir with the intent of rebranding the airline and serving markets in the Southeast, Midwest, and Alaska. The airline was renamed Sterling, and the Embraer aircraft replaced with 4 leased Saab 2000s. Currently, the only routes they are flying are those flown under the Aleutian Airways brand.

Wexford Capital has a history with airlines, starting with the purchase of the former Alaskan airline MarkAir's assets out of bankruptcy in 1995. Wexford went on to purchase and reorganize Republic Airways. Several of Sterling's current employees formerly worked at Republic, including Wayne Heller, Sterling's CEO.

== Destinations ==
List of destinations (As of May 2026)
City	Country (Subdivision)	IATA	Airport	Notes
Anchorage	USA (Alaska)	ANC	Ted Stevens Anchorage International Airport	Base
Cold Bay	USA (Alaska)	CDB	Cold Bay Airport	
Unalaska / Dutch Harbor	USA (Alaska)	DUT	Unalaska Airport	
Homer	USA (Alaska)	HOM	Homer Airport	
Kenai	USA (Alaska)	ENA	Kenai Municipal Airport	
King Salmon	USA (Alaska)	AKN	King Salmon Airport	Seasonal
Sand Point	USA (Alaska)	SDP	Sand Point Airport	
St. Mary's	USA (Alaska)	KSM	St. Mary's Airport	
St. Paul	USA (Alaska)	SNP	St. Paul Island Airport	
Unalakleet	USA (Alaska)	UNK	Unalakleet Airport	

== Fleet ==
As of November 2026, the Aleutian Airways fleet includes the following aircraft:

Aleutian Airways fleet
Aircraft	In service	Orders	Passengers	Notes
ATR 42-600	1	—		
ATR 72-600	1	—		
Saab 2000	6	—		Former PenAir aircraft.
Total	8	—		
