= Saab 2000 =

Twin-engined high-speed turboprop airliner built by Saab

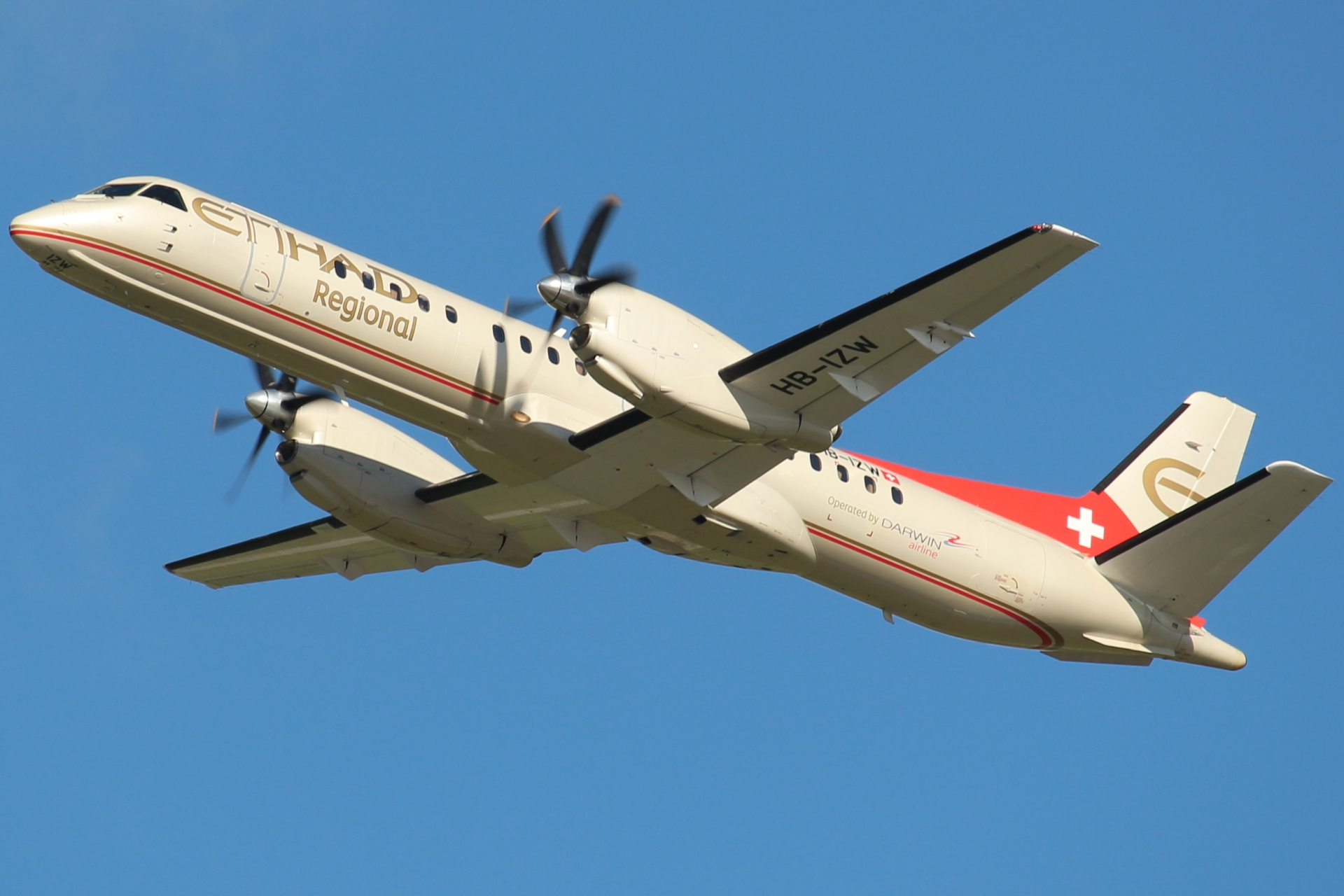
- Darwin Airline Saab 2000 in Etihad Regional livery taking off at Düsseldorf Airport in 2014

General information
- Type: Turboprop Regional airliner
- National origin: Sweden
- Manufacturer: Saab AB
- Status: In limited passenger service, in military service
- Number built: 63

History
- Manufactured: 1992–1999
- Introduction date: 30 August 1994
- First flight: 26 March 1992
- Developed from: Saab 340

The Saab 2000 is a twin-engined high-speed turboprop airliner built by Swedish aircraft manufacturer Saab. It is designed to carry 50–58 passengers and able to cruise at a maximum speed of 685 km/h (370 kn). Production took place in Linköping, Sweden. It first flew in March 1992 and was certified in 1994. The last aircraft was delivered in April 1999, a total of 63 aircraft were built. As of October 2024, a total of 31 Saab 2000s are either in airline or military service. (Note: "Current operators" refers.)

== Development and design ==
In the 1980s, Saab decided to build a fuselage-stretched derivative of its successful Saab 340 twin-turboprop regional airliner. The new aircraft was planned to meet a perceived demand for a high-speed 50-seat turboprop with good climb performance which could operate over short- and medium-range routes with similar block times to jet aircraft while retaining the efficiency provided by turboprop engines. The new airliner, named the Saab 2000, was formally launched in May 1989, with Saab already having firm orders for 46 aircraft and options for a further 147. The aircraft was assembled at Saab's Linköping factory, with major subcontractors including CASA, who built the aircraft's wings, Short Brothers, who built the rear fuselage and Valmet who built the aircraft's tail surfaces. The Saab 2000 first flew on 26 March 1992 and entered into scheduled airline service in September 1994, a few months after its certification by the Joint Aviation Authorities in March and the Federal Aviation Administration in April.

The Saab 2000 has a 15% greater wingspan than the Saab 340, and being 7.55 metres (24 ft 9 in) longer can carry up to 58 passengers (while for European Union, the certified Maximum Passenger Seating Capacities is 53 according to the Type-certificate Data Sheet issued by EASA.) in a high-density layout and 50 with a more comfortable 32 inches (81 cm) seat pitch. The 2000 was the first commercial aircraft to use the Allison GMA 2100 turboprop engines, which are derated to 3,390 kW (4,550 shp) for the plane. One engine was mounted on each wing, as in the 340, with the engines placed further from the fuselage than those of the 340 to reduce cabin noise. The Dowty-Rotol propellers are 3.81 m (12.5 ft) in diameter, and they have a slow rotational speed of 1,100 rpm at takeoff and 950 rpm in cruise. The aircraft was designed to operate at a maximum cruise speed of Mach 0.62.

== Operational history ==
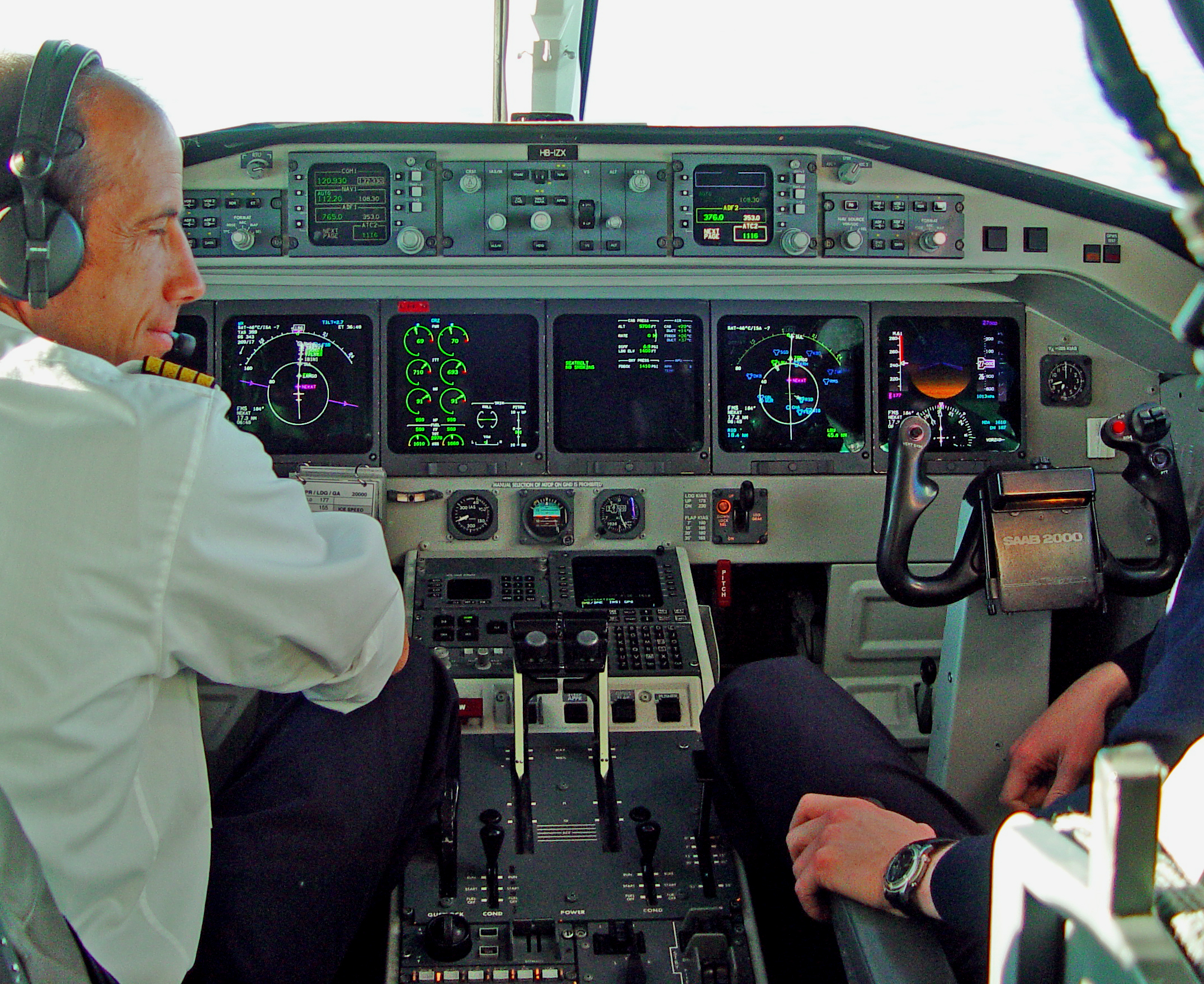
Saab 2000 cockpit

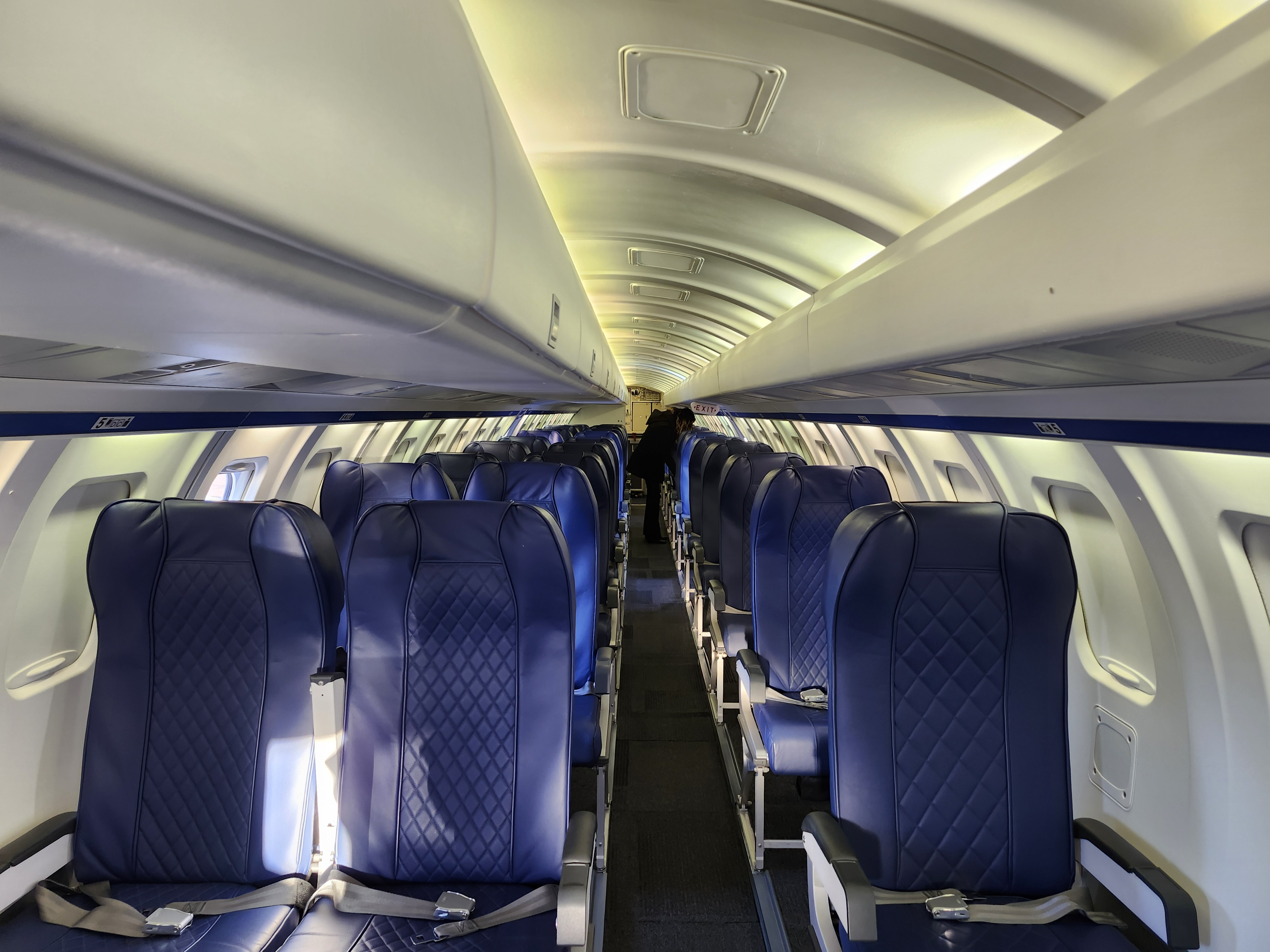
Saab 2000 cabin

Sales of the Saab 2000 were fairly limited. The major initial customer was Crossair, a regional airline of which Swissair was the majority shareholder. Crossair dubbed the aircraft "Concordino". The airline ultimately operated 34 aircraft between 1994 and 2005.

Crossair also took the delivery of the last example of newly manufactured Saab 2000 on 29 April 1999. Saab ended production of the 2000 due to limited demand, which was largely driven by the preference of regional airlines for regional jets such as the Bombardier CRJ and Embraer ERJ 145 family which provided better passenger comfort combined with better profitability.

France-based carrier Regional Airlines of Nantes took delivery of its first Saab 2000 turboprop in Paris in year 1995, which was scheduled to serve between Lyon and Madrid. In year 1996, the carrier accepted its fifth Saab 2000 into service, and the aircraft was assigned for the Marseille to Amsterdam route in August 1996.

The government of Marshall Islands committed to purchase two Saab 2000s (with an option to purchase two more), and the first delivery was taken by Air Marshall Islands to serve Micronesia Island region of the Pacific Ocean between year 1995–1998; after that the plane was leased to Air Vanuatu serving between Fiji and Vanuatu, while the lease was terminated in March 1999, (Note: Wiki article Air Vanuatu refers regarding date of termination.) and after that such Saab 2000 aircraft was sold to a Europe-based air carrier.

General Motors operated several 36-seat versions of Saab 2000 for corporate shuttle operations out of its Detroit headquarters between 1995 and 2007 and during that period was in talks with startup air carrier Pro Air to launch a regional airline unit to feed flights into Detroit City Airport. GM would offer a free lease on three Saab 2000s in exchange for free flights for its employees and a share in the revenues made on routes eventually chosen by Pro Air. However, the FAA grounded Pro Air on 18 September 2000 before consummation of the deal, and on 28 September 2000 NTSB rejected Pro Air's bid to return to the skies. One of the Saab 2000 aircraft previously operated by GM was delivered to the flight department of Penske Corporation in April 2008, and the aircraft was used to support the group's NASCAR auto racing team.

In the United Kingdom, the Saab 2000 was recognized as a low-ownership-cost aircraft. Eastern Airways introduced the Saab 2000 aircraft in 2004, and in 2008, the airline was flying six Saab 2000s to serve domestic flights within United Kingdom and to serve the energy-industry business in southern North Sea; the airline's fleet was further enlarged to nine in 2014. Also in 2014, Loganair introduced the type for its services between Shetland and the Scottish mainland.

Estonian airline NyxAir acquired two ex-Loganair Saab 2000 aircraft in August 2020 to work with Air Leap in Sweden and serving two destinations: Malmö and Ängelholm-Helsingborg, each of them both connected with Stockholm Bromma Airport respectively. (Note: Reference source published in June 2020 revealed the planning while the main text follows another reference source published in September 2020 reporting (some of) the operating routes by NyxAir at that time.) Starting in May 2021, NyxAir's 50-seat Saab 2000 aircraft were once assigned to Finland to operate the Kemi-Kokkola-Helsinki and Jyväskylä-Helsinki routes. NyxAir operated four examples of Saab 2000 aircraft as of 7 May 2021. (Note: The Airline's Operation Specification of the type refers.)

Transition of registry of four ex-NyxAir Saab 2000 aircraft to a Danish AOC registry, obtained by Frost Air at which its aircraft are home-based in Malmö, occurred in July 2024.

For the first converted freighter Saab 2000(F), NyxAir facilitated a 59-minute post-maintenance test flight on 6 March 2023 at Örebro for the Saab 2000(F) registered as ES-NSJ (Note: (msn 2000-037)) under NyxAir's AOC authority. In February 2024, it was reported that the bleed system of Saab 2000(F) has to be redesigned.

In the United States, PenAir took the delivery of its first Saab 2000 in 2015, for an upgrade of the passenger air service to Unalaska with larger aircraft. Some subsequent addition of Saab 2000s to PenAir in 2016 were examples previously serving the NASCAR teams. PenAir was the first US air carrier to use Saab 2000 aircraft for Part 121 scheduled passenger operations.

Sterling Airways in the United States formed a joint venture Alaska Seaplanes to operate Saab 2000 under the brand Aleutian Airways. In 2022, Aleutian Airways has been granted approval to start charter and scheduled air service to Unalaska upon completion of a test-flight using Saab 2000 aircraft, and after that charter service commences in September 2022 and the Aleutian Airways' first scheduled flight serving Unalaska commences on 16 November 2022. Extension on Saab 2000's service coverage to Sand Point, Cold Bay and, together with a seasonal scheduled service to King Salmon, commenced in 2023.

Air Charter Express, the passenger division of Freight Runners Express headquartered in Milwaukee, took delivery of the first example of the type in October 2021.

In June 2006, Pakistan completed the purchase of six Saab 2000s equipped with the Saab-Ericsson ERIEYE Airborne Early Warning system. In May 2007, this was renegotiated down to five aircraft, four of which would be equipped with the Erieye system. On 3 April 2008, the first Saab 2000 Erieye AEW&C was rolled out and presented to Pakistan Air Force officials during a ceremony in Sweden. Subsequent orders were placed in 2017 and 2020, which further expanded Pakistan's Erieye fleet; as of August 2024, Pakistan Air Force has nine Saab 2000 AEW&C examples.

One of the Pakistan Air Force's Saab 2000s may have been damaged during an Indian missile strikes on a hangar during the 2025 India–Pakistan conflict, although this was not confirmed, and denied by Pakistan. On 9 August 2025, three months after the conflict, the chief of the Indian Air Force claimed that a "large aircraft" (possibly an ELINT or AEW&C platform) was shot down at a distance of 300 km during the May conflict, describing it as the “largest-ever recorded surface-to-air kill". According to Indian sources, the engagement was attributed to the S-400 missile system through electronic tracking and radar data. This claim was not been verified by any independent or international sources and has been dismissed by Pakistan.

== Variants ==
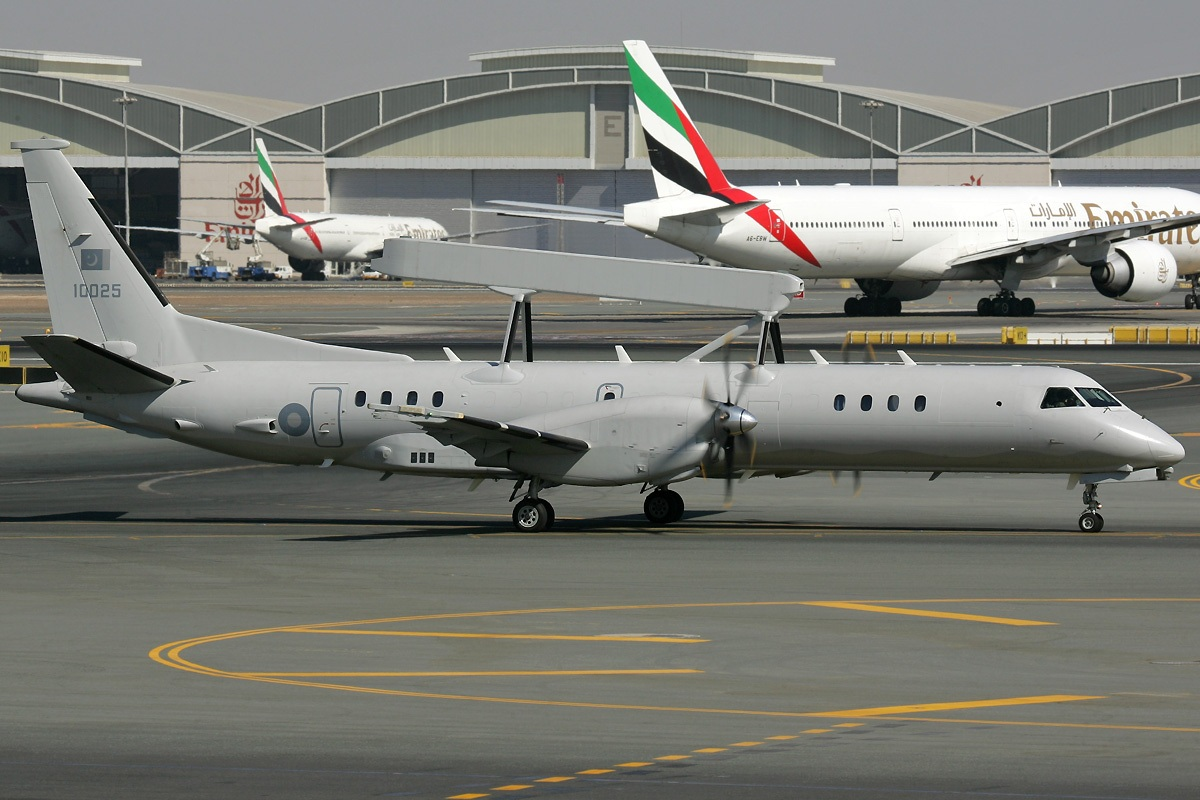
A Pakistan Air Force Saab 2000 AEW&C

- Saab 2000: 50–58 seat regional airliner.
- Saab 2000F: Test-flight of a freighter conversion example conducted on 6 March 2023.
- Saab 2000FI: Flight inspection aircraft, two examples (Note: registered as JA003G，JA004G) were delivered to the Japan Civil Aviation Bureau.
- Saab 2000 AEW&C: Airborne early warning and control variant fitted with Erieye active electronically scanned array radar and associated mission systems.
- Saab 2000 Airtracer: Configured with Airborne SIGINT system.
- Saab Swordfish MPA: Maritime patrol aircraft.

== Operators ==
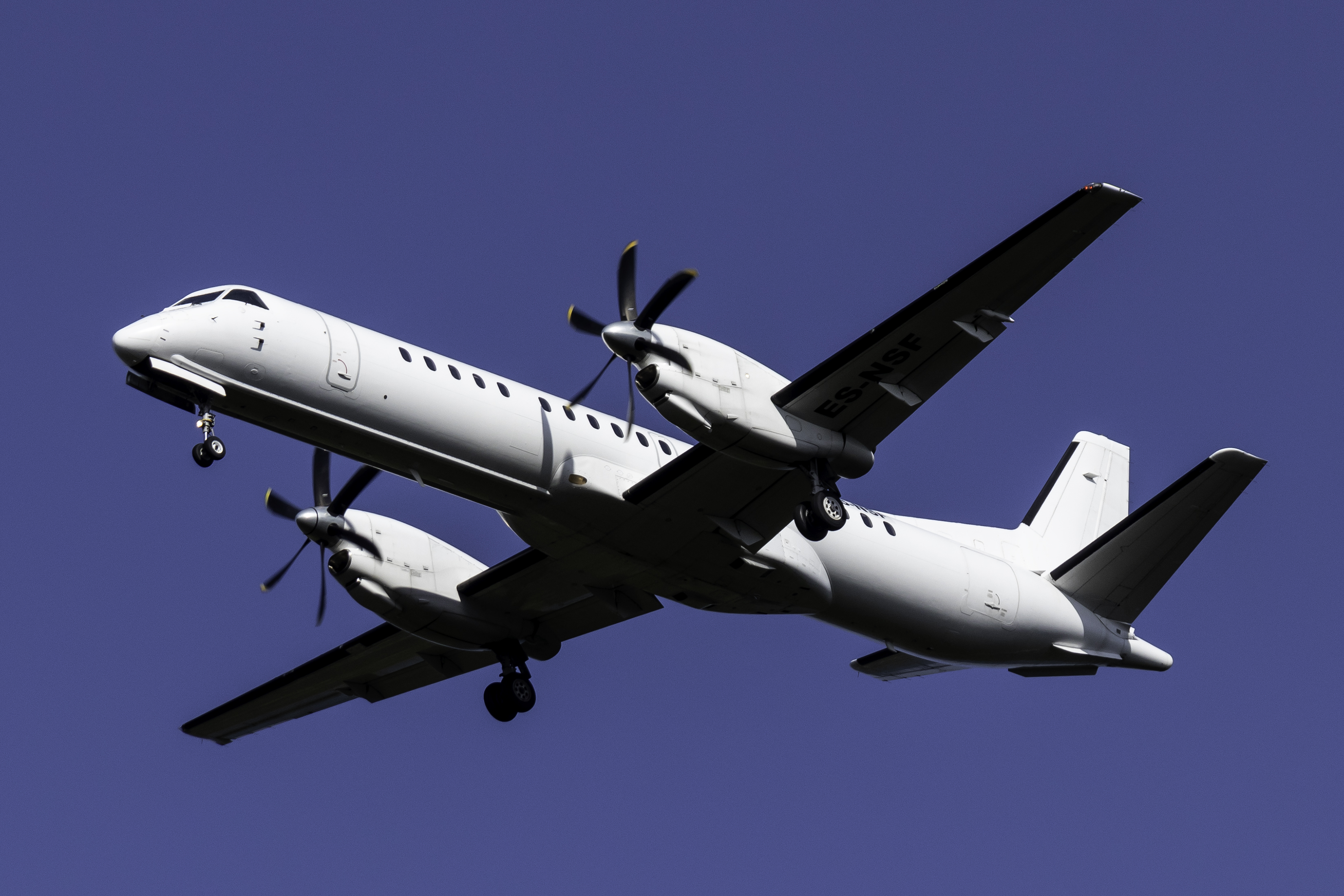
Former NyxAir Saab 2000

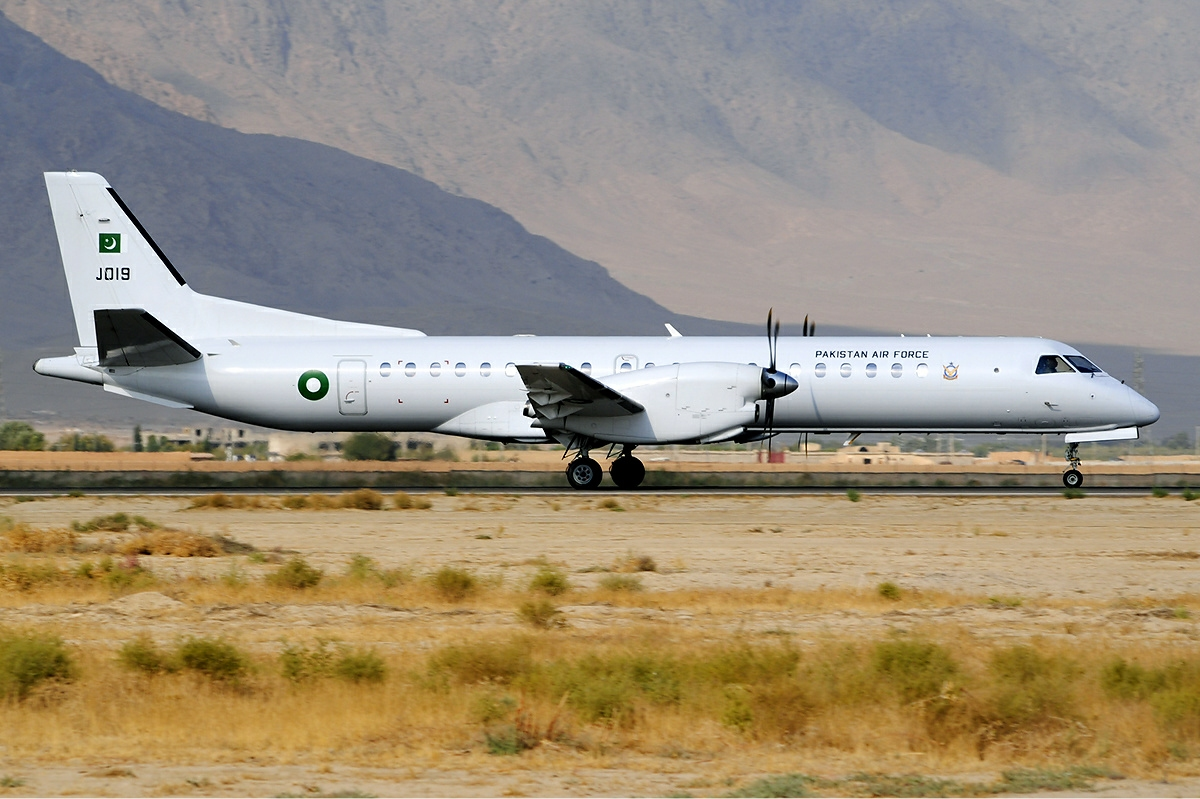
Pakistan Air Force Saab 2000

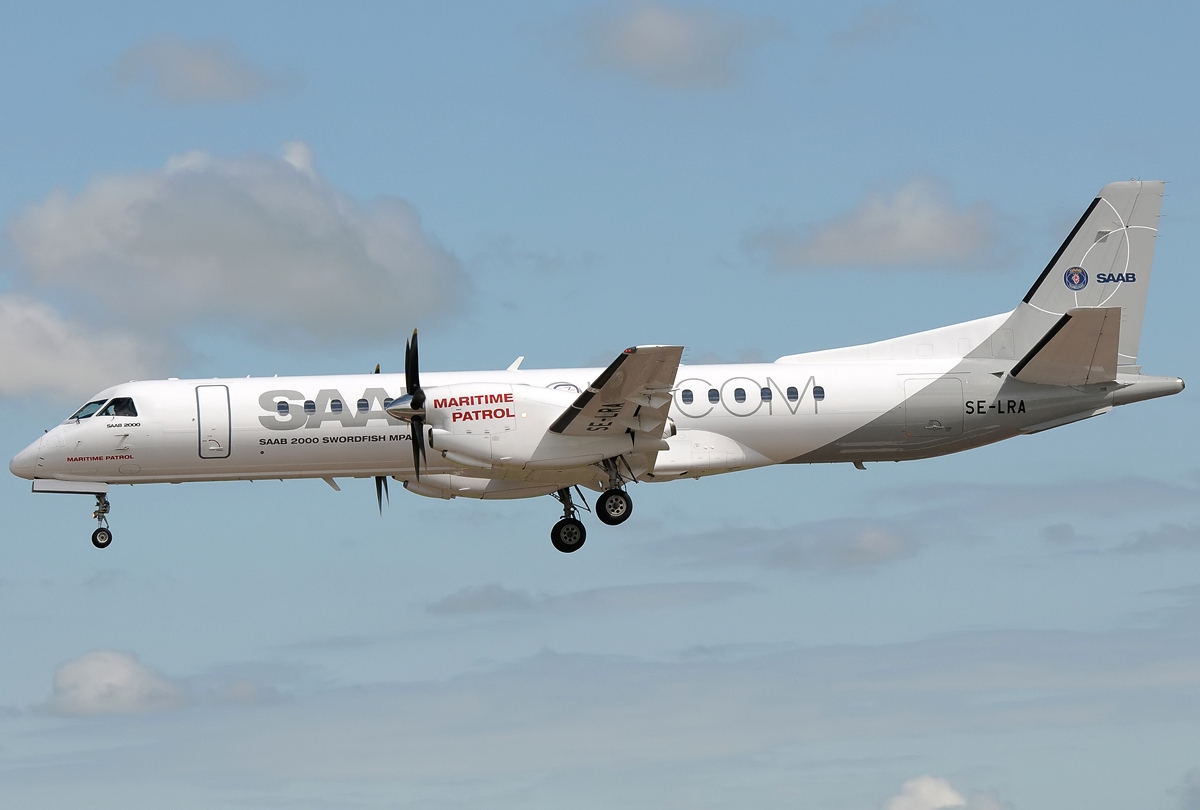
Saab Swordfish MPA

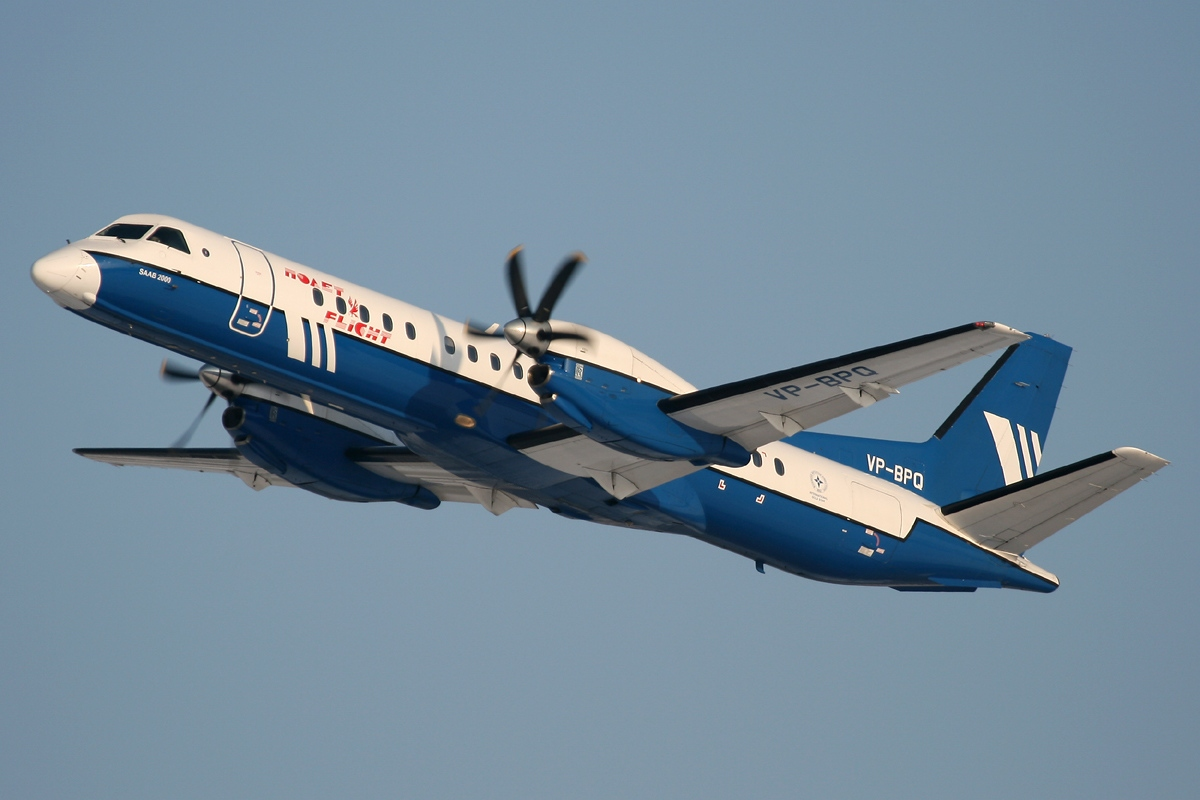
A former Polet Flight Saab 2000

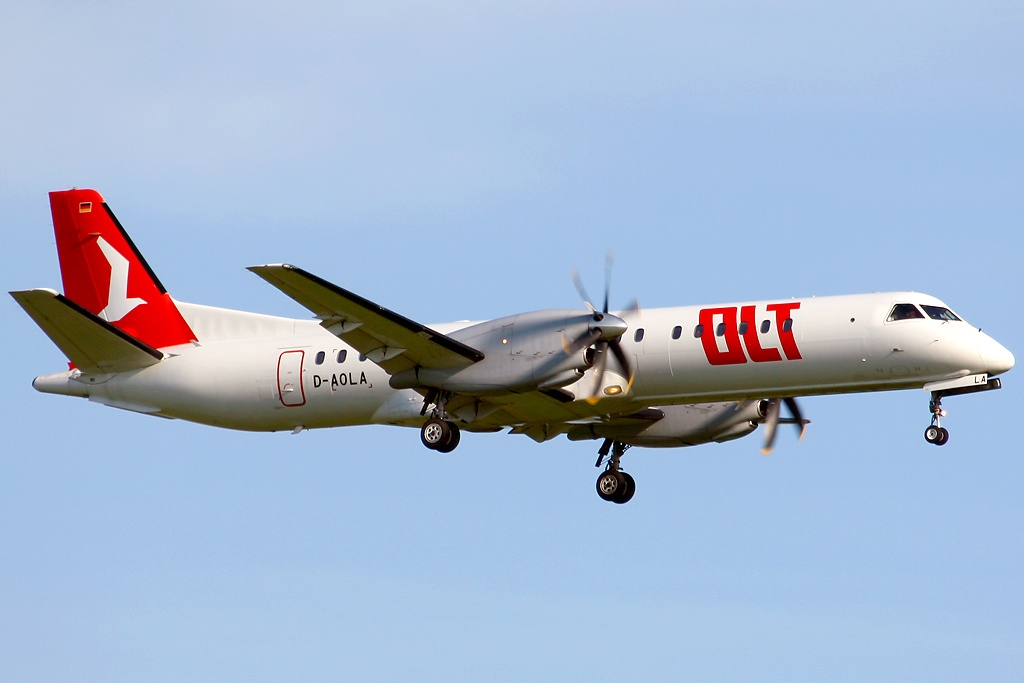
A former OLT Saab 2000

=== Current operators ===
As of October 2024, a total of 31 Saab 2000s remained active in civilian and military service.

- Air Charter Express (7)
- Aleutian Airways (4)
- Frost Air (4)
- Meregrass (3)
- Pakistan Air Force (9) (Note: 9 of which are reported to be operated by Pakistan Air Force as in year 2024)
- Royal Saudi Air Force (2)
- Saab Group (2)

=== Former operators ===
The following airlines formerly operated Saab 2000 aircraft in scheduled passenger service in the past:

- Adria Airways Switzerland
- Air France (operated by CityJet and Regional Airlines)
- Air Marshall Islands
- Blue1
- Braathens Regional
- Carpatair
- Crossair
- Deutsche BA
- Eastern Airways
- Flybe
- FlyLAL
- Golden Air
- Lipican AER
- Loganair
- Malmo Aviation
- Moldavian Airlines
- NyxAir
- OLT Express Germany
- PGA Portugália Airlines (operated by OMNI Aviation)
- PenAir
- Polet Flight
- Scandinavian Airlines (operated by Braathens Regional)
- Scandinavian Commuter (operated by Swelink)
- SkyWork Airlines
- TUS Airways

The following operator formerly operated Saab 2000 aircraft for civil use in the past:

- Japan Civil Aviation Bureau

== Accidents and incidents ==
As of February 2024, there were 4 hull-loss accidents involving Saab 2000 series aircraft, and among those accidents one of them involving 1 fatality.

=== Accidents with fatalities ===
- On 17 October 2019, PenAir Flight 3296 suffered a runway overrun while landing at Unalaska Airport in Alaska with 42 occupants on board; 1 person died and 9 were injured. The probable cause was the incorrect wiring of the wheel speed transducer harnesses on the left main landing gear during overhaul, causing the antiskid system to malfunction. Contributing factors were Saab's failing to consider and protect against human error during maintenance, in its design of the harness; the FAA's lack of consideration of the RSA size, allowing the Saab 2000 to operate at the airport; and the flight crew's willingness to land with a tailwind exceeding the airplane's limit due to their plan continuation bias, aggravated by PenAir's failure to apply its qualification policy which allowed the pilot to operate at a challenging airport with limited experience at the airport and in the craft.

=== Hull losses ===
- On 8 October 1999, a Saab 2000 aircraft registered as SE-LSF and named "Eir Viking", was being taxied by two technicians when it crashed into closed hangar doors at Arlanda airport in Sweden. The aircraft was damaged beyond repair.
- On 10 July 2002, Swiss International Air Lines Flight 850, registered as HB-IZY, was forced to make an emergency landing at Werneuchen Airfield, Germany, as a result of severe weather. One of the sixteen passengers on board suffered minor injuries. The aircraft was damaged beyond economic repair when it hit an earth bank placed across the runway, where the runway markings did not conform to standards.

=== Other incidents ===
- On 15 December 2014, Loganair Flight 6780 was struck by lightning while approaching Sumburgh Airport. When the commander made nose-up pitch inputs the aircraft did not respond as he expected. After reaching 4,000 ft the aircraft pitched to a minimum of 19° nose down and exceeded the applicable maximum operating speed by 80 kt, with a peak descent rate of 9,500 ft/min.
  The flight subsequently suffered from control difficulties and nosedived from 4000 feet to 1000 feet after the crew tried taking over the controls, but failed to notice that the autopilot was still engaged. The pilots then declared a mayday and returned to Aberdeen Airport. There were 33 occupants onboard and no injuries were reported.
  The subsequent investigation discovered that the planes' autopilot could not be overridden by pilot input, making it unique among all other aircraft in service. AAIB reported safety actions to be taken regarding the autopilot operation; putting "Notice to Aircrew (NOTAC 123/14)" in place; and revision to Autopilot Standard Operating Procedures.
  This incident is featured in the first episode, titled "North Sea Nightmare", of season 21 of Mayday, repackaged as season 16, episode 1 of Air Disasters (first broadcast on 25 April 2021).

== Specifications ==
Data from Brassey's World Aircraft & Systems Directory 1999/2000 unless otherwise specified.

General characteristics

- Crew: 2
- Capacity: 50–58 passengers / 5,900 kg (13,007 lb) payload
- Length: 27.28 m (89 ft 6 in)
- Wingspan: 24.76 m (81 ft 3 in)
- Height: 7.73 m (25 ft 4 in)
- Wing area: 55.7 m^{2} (600 sq ft)
- Airfoil: root: NASA/Langley MS(1)-0316; tip: NASA/Langley MS(1)-0312
- Empty weight: 13,800 kg (30,424 lb)
- Max takeoff weight: 22,800 kg (50,265 lb)
- Powerplant: 2 × Rolls-Royce AE 2100P turboprop engines, 3,096 kW (4,152 hp) each
- Propellers: 6-bladed Dowty Propellers constant-speed composite fully feathering and reversible-pitch propellers

Performance

- Maximum speed: 685 km/h (426 mph, 370 kn)
- Cruise speed: 665 km/h (413 mph, 359 kn)
- Range: 2,869 km (1,783 mi, 1,549 nmi)
- Service ceiling: 9,450 m (31,000 ft)
- Rate of climb: 11.4 m/s (2,240 ft/min)
- Field length: 1,200 m (Note: The figure is obtained from the manufacturer's website. Other websites offer slightly different figures, for example 1,221m "take-off distance", or 1,300m take-off field length.)

Avionics

- Rockwell Collins Pro Line 4 avionics suite with integrated avionics processor (IAP)

== See also ==
Related development

- CASA 3000

Aircraft of comparable role, configuration, and era

- Antonov An-140
- ATR 42
- CASA/IPTN CN-235
- DHC-8-300
- Fokker 50
- IPTN N-250
- Xian MA60
- Xian MA600

Related lists

- List of civil aircraft
