= Port Moller Airport =

Port Moller Airport Port Moller Air Force Station
- IATA: PML; ICAO: PAAL; FAA LID: 1AK3

Summary
- Airport type: Private
- Owner: U.S. Department of the Interior, Bureau of Land Management
- Serves: Port Moller
- Location: 87 NM northeast of Cold Bay, Alaska
- Elevation AMSL: 20 ft / 6 m
- Coordinates: 56°00′22″N 160°33′39″W

Map
- Location of airport in Alaska

Runways
Direction	Length		Surface
Direction	ft	m	Surface
1/19	3,500	1,067	Gravel

Statistics
- Enplanements (2008): 487
- Source: Federal Aviation Administration

Port Moller Airport (IATA: PML, ICAO: PAAL, FAA LID: 1AK3) is a publicly owned, private-use airport located 87 nautical miles (161 km; 100 mi) northeast of the central business district of Cold Bay, in the Aleutians East Borough of the U.S. state of Alaska. It is owned by the U.S. Department of the Interior, Bureau of Land Management. It was previously known as Port Moller Air Force Station.

== Overview ==
Scheduled airline service to Cold Bay Airport is provided by Peninsula Airways (PenAir). As per Federal Aviation Administration records, this airport had 487 commercial passenger boardings (enplanements) in calendar year 2008, an increase of 14% from the 427 enplanements in 2007.

Although most U.S. airports use the same three-letter location identifier for the FAA and IATA, this airport is assigned 1AK3 by the FAA and PML by the IATA.

== Airlines and destinations ==
Airlines	Destinations
Grant Aviation	Cold Bay, Nelson Lagoon; Seasonal: King Salmon

== Facilities ==
The airport covers an area of 369 acres (149 ha) at an elevation of 20 feet (6 m) above mean sea level. It has one runway designated 1/19 with a gravel surface measuring 3,500 by 100 feet (1,067 x 30 m).

== History ==
The airport was built in 1958 to support Port Moller Air Force Station, a Cold War United States Air Force Distant Early Warning Line radar station. The station was operated by Detachment 4, 714th Aircraft Control and Warning Squadron based at Cold Bay Air Force Station, near Cold Bay, Alaska. The radar station was deactivated in September 1969, ending military use of the airport. The Air Force remediated the site around 2000, removing all abandoned military structures and returning the site to a natural condition.

== See also ==
- List of airports in Alaska
