= PACD =

PACD may refer to:

- Posterior amorphous corneal dystrophy, an eye disease
- Cold Bay Airport in Alaska, United States, ICAO airport code PACD
