= Arthur Woodley =

Arthur Woodley may refer to:

- Art Woodley (died 30 May 1990, aged 84), founder of Woodley Airways
- Arthur Woodley (bass opera singer), sang in 2013 premiere of Champion (opera)
