= False Pass Airport =

Airport in Alaska, United States

- IATA: KFP; ICAO: PAKF; FAA LID: KFP

Summary
- Airport type: Public
- Owner: Alaska DOT&PF - Central Region
- Serves: False Pass, Alaska
- Elevation AMSL: 20 ft (6.1 m)
- Coordinates: 54°50′51″N 163°24′37″W

Map
- Location of airport in Alaska

Runways
Direction	Length		Surface
Direction	ft	m	Surface
14/32	2,150	655	Gravel

Statistics (2025)
- Aircraft operations (2025): 148
- Based aircraft (2025): 0
- Passengers: 149
- Freight: 83,000 lbs
- Source: Federal Aviation Administration; Source: Bureau of Transportation

False Pass Airport (IATA: KFP, ICAO: PAKF, FAA LID: KFP) is a state owned, public use airport in False Pass, a city in the Aleutians East Borough of the U.S. state of Alaska. Scheduled airline service to Cold Bay Airport and Akutan Airport is provided by Grant Aviation

As per Federal Aviation Administration records, the airport had 505 passenger boardings (enplanements) in calendar year 2008, 482 enplanements in 2009, and 321 in 2010. It is included in the National Plan of Integrated Airport Systems for 2011–2015, which categorized it as a general aviation airport (the commercial service category requires at least 2,500 enplanements per year).

== Facilities and aircraft ==
False Pass Airport covers 20 acres (8 ha) at an elevation of 20 feet (6 m) above mean sea level. It has one runway designated 13/31 with a gravel surface measuring 2,100 by 75 feet (640 x 23 m). For the 12-month period ending December 31, 2005, the airport had 1,050 aircraft operations, an average of 87 per month: 52% general aviation and 48% air taxi.

== Airlines and destinations ==
The following airlines offer scheduled passenger service at this airport:

Airlines	Destinations
Grant Aviation	Cold Bay, King Cove

=== Statistics ===
Top domestic destinations: January – December 2016
Rank	City	Airport	Passengers
1	(Alaska) Cold Bay, AK	Cold Bay Airport	340
2	(Alaska) Akutan, AK	Akutan Airport	10

== See also ==
- List of airports in Alaska
