= PAOU =

PAOU may refer one of the following

- PAOU, airport code for Nelson Lagoon Airport in Alaska, USA
- Petroleum Authority of Uganda
