= Sand Point Airport =

Airport in Alaska, United States

- IATA: SDP; ICAO: PASD; FAA LID: SDP

Summary
- Airport type: Public
- Owner: Alaska DOT&PF - Central Region
- Serves: Sand Point, Alaska
- Elevation AMSL: 21 ft (6.4 m)
- Coordinates: 55°18′49″N 160°31′17″W

Map
- Location of airport in Alaska

Runways
Direction	Length		Surface
Direction	ft	m	Surface
13/31	5,213	1,589	Asphalt

Statistics (2003)
- Aircraft operations: 2,012
- Source: Federal Aviation Administration

Sand Point Airport (IATA: SDP, ICAO: PASD, FAA LID: SDP) is a state owned, public use airport located two nautical miles (4 km) southwest of the central business district of Sand Point, a city in the Aleutians East Borough in the U.S. state of Alaska. Scheduled airline service to Anchorage International Airport is provided by Peninsula Airways (PenAir).

As per the Federal Aviation Administration, this airport had 4,296 passenger boardings (enplanements) in calendar year 2008, 3,957 in 2009, and 4,281 in 2010. The National Plan of Integrated Airport Systems for 2011–2015 categorized it as a non-primary commercial service airport.

== Facilities and aircraft ==
Sand Point Airport resides at elevation of 21 feet (6 m) above mean sea level. It has one runway designated 14/32 with an asphalt surface measuring 5,213 by 150 feet (1,589 x 46 m). For the 12-month period ending December 16, 2003, the airport had 2,012 aircraft operations, an average of 167 per month: 59.6% general aviation, 32.6% air taxi, and 7.8% scheduled commercial.

== Airlines and destinations ==
Airlines	Destinations
Aleutian Airways	Anchorage, Cold Bay

=== Statistics ===
Carrier shares: September 2024 – August 2025
Carrier	Passengers (arriving and departing)
Aleutian	4,780(100%)

Top domestic destinations: September 2024 – August 2025
Rank	Destination	Airport	Passengers
1	Anchorage, AK	Ted Stevens Anchorage International (ANC)	2,250
2	Cold Bay, AK	Cold Bay Airport (CDB)	40

== See also ==
- List of airports in Alaska
