= Ted Stevens Anchorage International Airport =

Main airport serving Anchorage, Alaska, United States

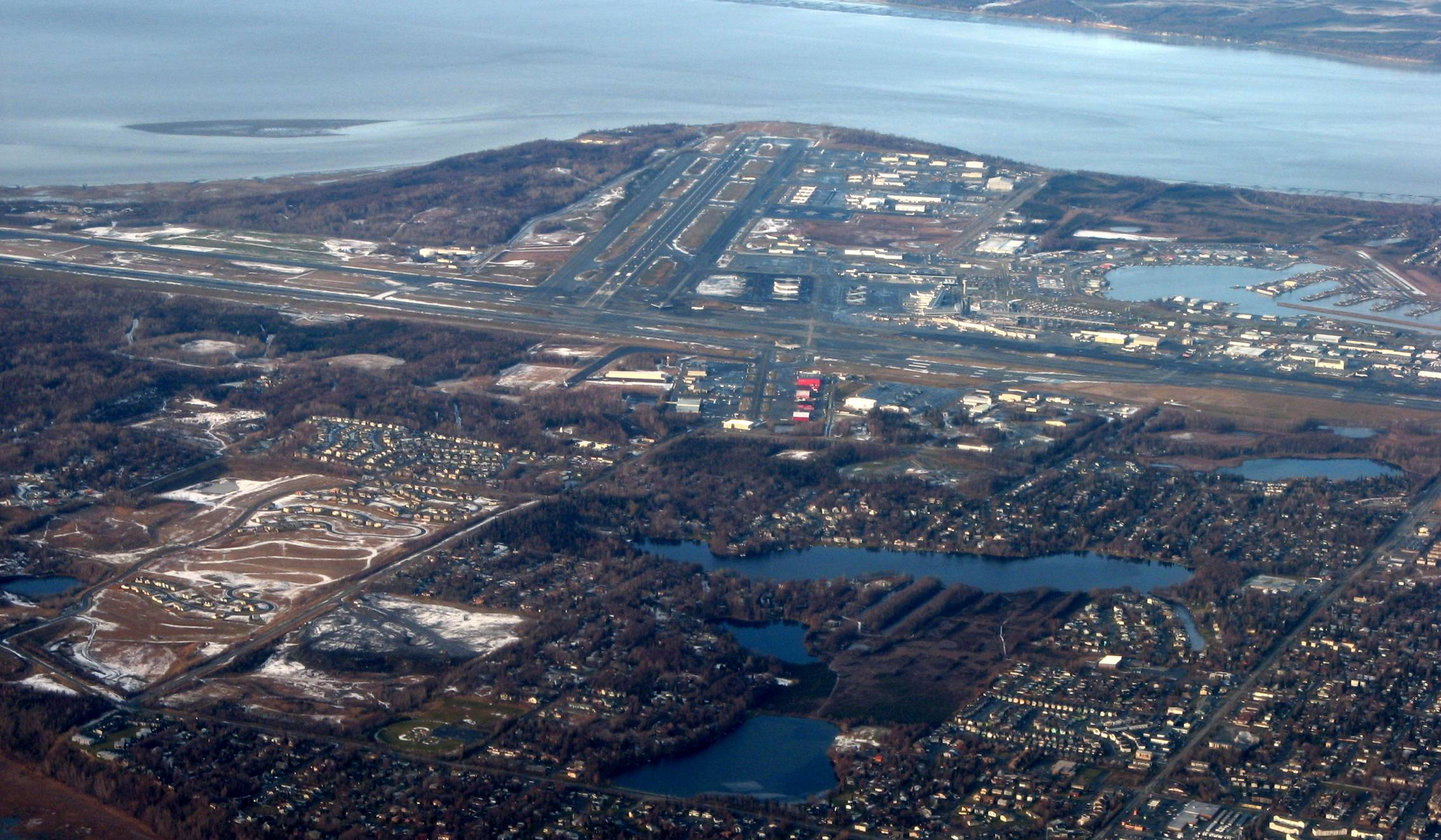
- IATA: ANC; ICAO: PANC; FAA LID: ANC

Summary
- Airport type: Public
- Owner/Operator: State of Alaska DOT&PF
- Serves: Anchorage metropolitan area
- Opened: 1951; 75 years ago
- Hub for: Alaska Airlines; Atlas Air; FedEx Express; Polar Air Cargo; UPS Airlines
- Elevation AMSL: 151 ft (46 m)
- Coordinates: 61°10′27″N 149°59′54″W
- Website: ancairport.com

Maps
- FAA airport diagram
- Interactive map of Ted Stevens Anchorage International Airport

Runways
Direction	Length		Surface
Direction	ft	m	Surface
7R/25L	12,400	3,780	Asphalt
15/33	10,865	3,312	Asphalt
7L/25R	10,600	3,231	Asphalt

Helipads
Number	Length		Surface
Number	ft	m	Surface
H1	100	30	Asphalt

Statistics (2025 (FY 2025))
- Total passengers: 5,368,921
- Aircraft landings: 103,849
- Cargo handled (lbs.): 3,751,049,000
- Source: Federal Aviation Administration; Source: Bureau of Transportation

Ted Stevens Anchorage International Airport (IATA: ANC, ICAO: PANC, FAA LID: ANC) is the primary airport serving Anchorage, the most populous city in the U.S. state of Alaska, located 5 miles (8 km) southwest of downtown Anchorage. The airport is named for Ted Stevens (1923–2010), who served as a senator of Alaska from 1968 to 2009. It is included in the Federal Aviation Administration (FAA) National Plan of Integrated Airport Systems for 2017–2021, in which it is categorized as a medium-hub primary commercial service facility. It is a major cargo hub for trans-Pacific traffic, ranking as one of the world's busiest airports by cargo traffic.

== History ==
Built in 1951, the airport was served in the 1950s by Alaska Airlines, Northwest Orient, Pacific Northern Airlines and Reeve Aleutian Airways, using aircraft ranging from Douglas DC-3s to Boeing 377s, and was also a refuelling stop for Canadian Pacific Air Lines service to the Far East (one such aircraft being involved in a 1951 disappearance). From 1955 to 2011, the eastern end of the airport's southernmost runway connected to the Kulis Air National Guard Base.

=== Crossroads of the World ===
By the mid-1980s the airport's nickname was "Crossroads of the World". Anchorage was a common stopover for passengers flying between Europe and East Asia, because airspace in China, the Soviet Union and Eastern Bloc countries was off-limits and because the first generation of jet airliners (including widebody types) did not have the range to fly non-stop across the Pacific Ocean. Carriers using Anchorage for this purpose included:

- Air France, British Airways, Iberia, KLM, Lufthansa, Sabena, Swissair and Spantax all used Anchorage as a stopover point between Europe and the Far East of Asia into the 1980s to 1991.
- Japan Airlines served Seattle through Anchorage in the early 1960s, and offered service through Anchorage to London, Paris, Amsterdam, Copenhagen, Düsseldorf, Hamburg, New York City & São Paulo from the 1960s until October 1991. Last JAL flight was JL438 on October 31, 1991, Paris–Charles de Gaulle - Anchorage - Tokyo–Narita.
- Korean Air used Anchorage as a stopover point for flights between Seoul and both Europe and the continental US in the 1980s. On September 1, 1983, one of these flights, Flight 007 was shot down by a Soviet pilot who had mistaken it for a spy plane, after unintentionally violating Soviet airspace.
- Northwest Orient, the first airline to operate scheduled trans-Pacific service after World War II, used Elmendorf Field and later Anchorage International as a stopover for service between US points (Seattle, Chicago and Minneapolis at various times) and Tokyo as late as the mid-1970s.
- Scandinavian Airlines (SAS) began a transpolar flight from Copenhagen to Tokyo via Anchorage on February 24, 1957.

In the mid-1980s airport officials knew that the then-new Boeing 747-400, with a longer range than then-existing aircraft, would decrease stopovers. They did not expect that Mikhail Gorbachev's glasnost, towards the end of the Cold War, would open Soviet airspace to flights, causing the decrease to occur sooner than planned. By 1988, 16 airline flights that had previously stopped in Anchorage—each bringing almost $80,000 in revenue to the state—instead flew nonstop over Siberia.

=== 1990s ===
Most scheduled passenger service from Anchorage to Europe and Asia ceased in the early 1990s. Korean Air continued to serve Anchorage three times a week on a yearly scheduled basis until March 2005, which was reduced to three times a week only for the summer season in 2006. China Airlines, the last Asian carrier to serve Anchorage on a regular basis, used Anchorage as an intermediate stop on its Taipei–New York route until 2011, when it rerouted these flights to stop in Osaka. While a few charter passenger aircraft still stop at Anchorage on flights between Asia and the eastern United States, scheduled cargo carriers – which benefit from more volume and thus shorter route segments – continue to use Anchorage frequently. Condor still uses the Frankfurt-Anchorage route on a Airbus A330neo.

In the 1990s, Alaska Airlines and Aeroflot operated services from Anchorage to several destinations in the Russian Far East, including Khabarovsk, Magadan, Petropavlovsk, Vladivostok and Yuzhno-Sakhalinsk. Alaska Airlines pulled out of these markets in 1998 due to insufficient demand, while the Aeroflot services were primarily intended as technical stops en route to Seattle and San Francisco and were cancelled once newer aircraft and nonstop flights became available. Reeve Aleutian Airways, Dalavia and MAVIAL Magadan Airlines also offered service between Anchorage and the Russian Far East at various times, catering to Kamchatka oil exploration and other niche markets.

The airport was renamed in 2000 by the Alaska Legislature to honor then long-standing US Senator Ted Stevens. Stevens survived a crash at the airport in 1978 that killed his wife Ann.

=== Recent history (2018–present) ===
In October 2018, Alaska Governor Bill Walker and Heilongjiang Province Governor Wang Wentao announced plans to connect Anchorage and Harbin Taiping International Airport with year-round, nonstop flights as early as the summer of 2019.

On November 30, 2018, the airport suffered minor damage and was temporarily closed following a magnitude 7.0 earthquake in the area. In June 2019, American Airlines switched the Boeing 737-800 on their seasonal route to Phoenix with the Airbus A321neo making them the first airline to use the A321neo at Anchorage. In January 2023, Delta replaced their Boeing 737-900 and 757-200 in favor of the A321neo for their route to Minneapolis-St. Paul.

During the COVID-19 pandemic, the airport was briefly the busiest in the United States due to sustained volume of cargo flights through Alaska while passenger travel sharply decreased at other American airports.

Due to the 2022 Russian invasion of Ukraine and subsequent sanctions on airlines, commercial flights between Japan and Western Europe once again overfly Alaska in the eastbound direction. However, due to the advanced range of the airliners used for these flights, such as the Airbus A350, Boeing 777 and Boeing 787 Dreamliner, the stopover in Anchorage is no longer needed and flights are operated nonstop. In addition, since the airspace of other Post-soviet states as well as that of China remains open for western traffic, some flights instead opt for a westbound route that overflies the Caucasus, Central Asia, and China. Some re-routed cargo flights do however stop in Anchorage, such as Nippon Cargo Airlines Flight 51, which operates Amsterdam - Milan - Anchorage - Tokyo four times weekly.

Southwest Airlines began seasonal summer service to Anchorage on May 15, 2026, with flights from Denver and Las Vegas.

== Passenger traffic ==
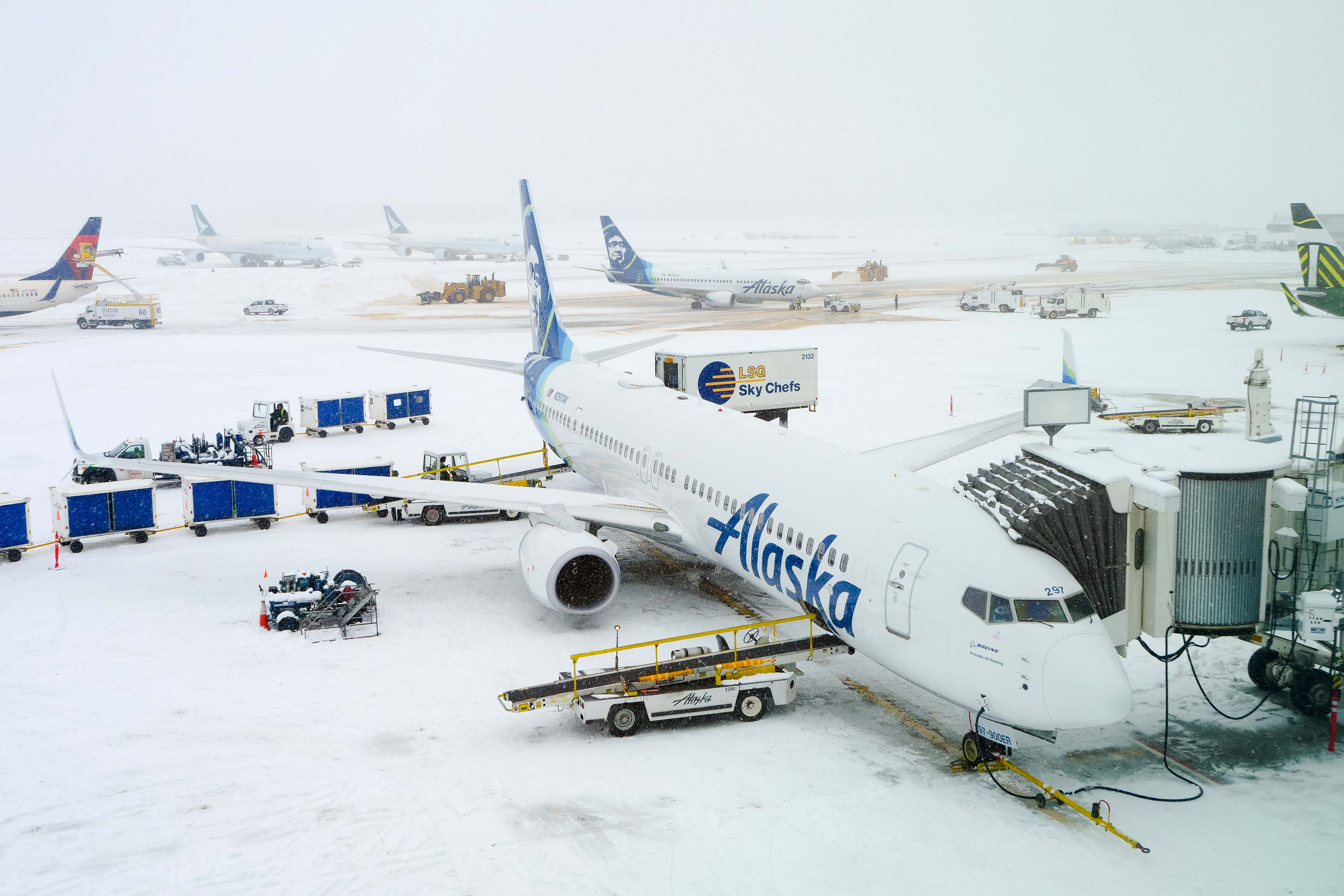
An Alaska Airlines Boeing 737-900ER at the airport in winter

Ted Stevens Anchorage International Airport's passenger traffic hovered around the five million mark between 1998 and 2008, apart from in 2002 when the airport suffered a 13% drop in traffic. Fairbanks and Juneau are the next busiest airports though neither managed more than half a million passengers in 2007. Anchorage traffic peaks in June, July and August when passenger numbers are twice as high as between October and April. Most major US passenger carriers serve ANC, with the majority of passenger flight operations by Alaska Airlines to and from Seattle (an average of 20 flights per day) and Fairbanks (5-7 flights per day).

Anchorage was once a minor connecting point for air traffic to the Russian Far East. During the summer season of 2008, there was one weekly flight to Russia by Vladivostok Air. Yakutia Airlines resumed summer seasonal service to Russia in 2012. As of 2025, service to Russia has ended. Many of Alaska's North Slope workers live either in Anchorage or elsewhere in the Lower 48 states and fly through the airport to their jobs in Prudhoe Bay.

As per Federal Aviation Administration records, the airport had 2,599,313 passenger boardings (enplanements) in calendar year 2008, 2,282,666 enplanements in 2009, and 2,342,310 in 2010.

The nearest other international airports from Anchorage are Fairbanks International Airport and Juneau International Airport. Fairbanks International Airport is also the second busiest airport in Alaska.

== International cargo hub ==
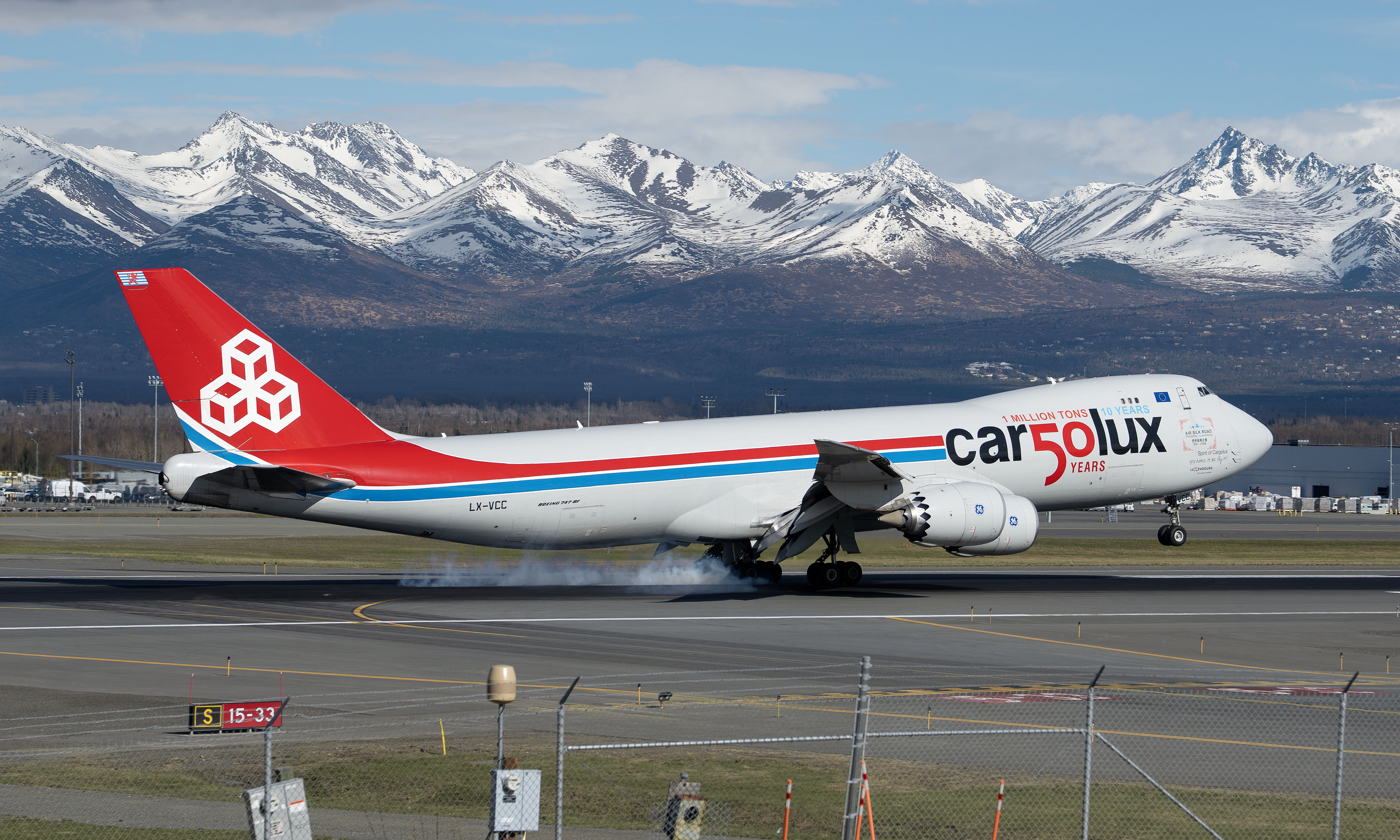
A Cargolux Boeing 747-8F landing from Hong Kong

Ted Stevens Anchorage International Airport is a major cargo hub. In 2023, it ranked as the busiest cargo airport in the US and the world's third-busiest cargo airport in 2025. Cargo airlines travelling between Asia and the contiguous US prefer to refuel in Anchorage to carry less fuel and more cargo.

FedEx Express and UPS Airlines operate major hubs at Anchorage International for cargo heading to and from Asia-Pacific. NWA Cargo used to operate a major hub at the airport until December 28, 2009, when it closed all operations for Northwest Cargo at all airports. FedEx Express is the airport's largest cargo facility and can handle as many as 13,400 packages per hour, employing more than 1,200 people and providing a full customs clearance system. United Parcel Service's hub handles about 5,000 parcels per hour. Both companies forecast a large growth in traffic over the next several years as trade with China and other East Asian countries increases and plan to expand their Anchorage facilities comparatively. The United States Postal Service also operates a large sectional center facility (SCF) for the 995xx ZIP Codes. It processes mail and parcels headed to and from all Alaska cities.

The United States Department of Transportation allows Anchorage and other Alaskan airports to be used as a transfer point for cargo between different aircraft of the same foreign air carrier without applying for special permission, a privilege not available at airports in the contiguous US. In 2020, the airport applied for similar authority for passenger traffic, which would potentially allow foreign airlines to use Anchorage as a connecting hub for international passengers. A similar exemption was previously granted to airports in Puerto Rico.

== Facilities and aircraft ==
Ted Stevens Anchorage International Airport covers an area of 4,608 acres (1,865 ha)) at an elevation of 151 ft (46 m) above mean sea level. It has three runways: 7L/25R is 10,600 ft × 150 ft (3,231 m × 46 m) with an asphalt surface; 7R/25L is 12,400 ft × 200 ft (3,780 m × 61 m) with an asphalt/concrete surface; 15/33 is 10,865 ft × 200 ft (3,312 m × 61 m) with an asphalt surface. The airport also has one asphalt helipad that is 100 ft × 100 ft (30 m × 30 m).

For the 12 months ending April 30, 2019, the airport had 261,961 aircraft operations, an average of 718 per day: 38% scheduled commercial, 32% general aviation, 29% air taxi, and <1% military. At that time there were 109 aircraft based at this airport: 61% multi-engine, 14% helicopter, 15% jet, and 10% single-engine. The FAA projects operations to increase to 334,279 by 2030, or 918.882 operations per day.

The airport also has a seaplane base adjacent to it, so that seaplanes and floatplanes can take off and land. The Lake Hood Seaplane Base, adjacent to Anchorage Airport, is the busiest seaplane base in the world.

== Terminals ==
Ted Stevens Anchorage International Airport has two terminals: the South Terminal with 24 gates, and the North Terminal with 8 gates, for a total of 32 gates.

The South Terminal (domestic) serves Air Canada, Alaska Airlines, American Airlines, Condor (Departures), Delta Air Lines, Discover Airlines (Departures), Sun Country Airlines, and United Airlines. All regional intrastate carriers also use the South Terminal.

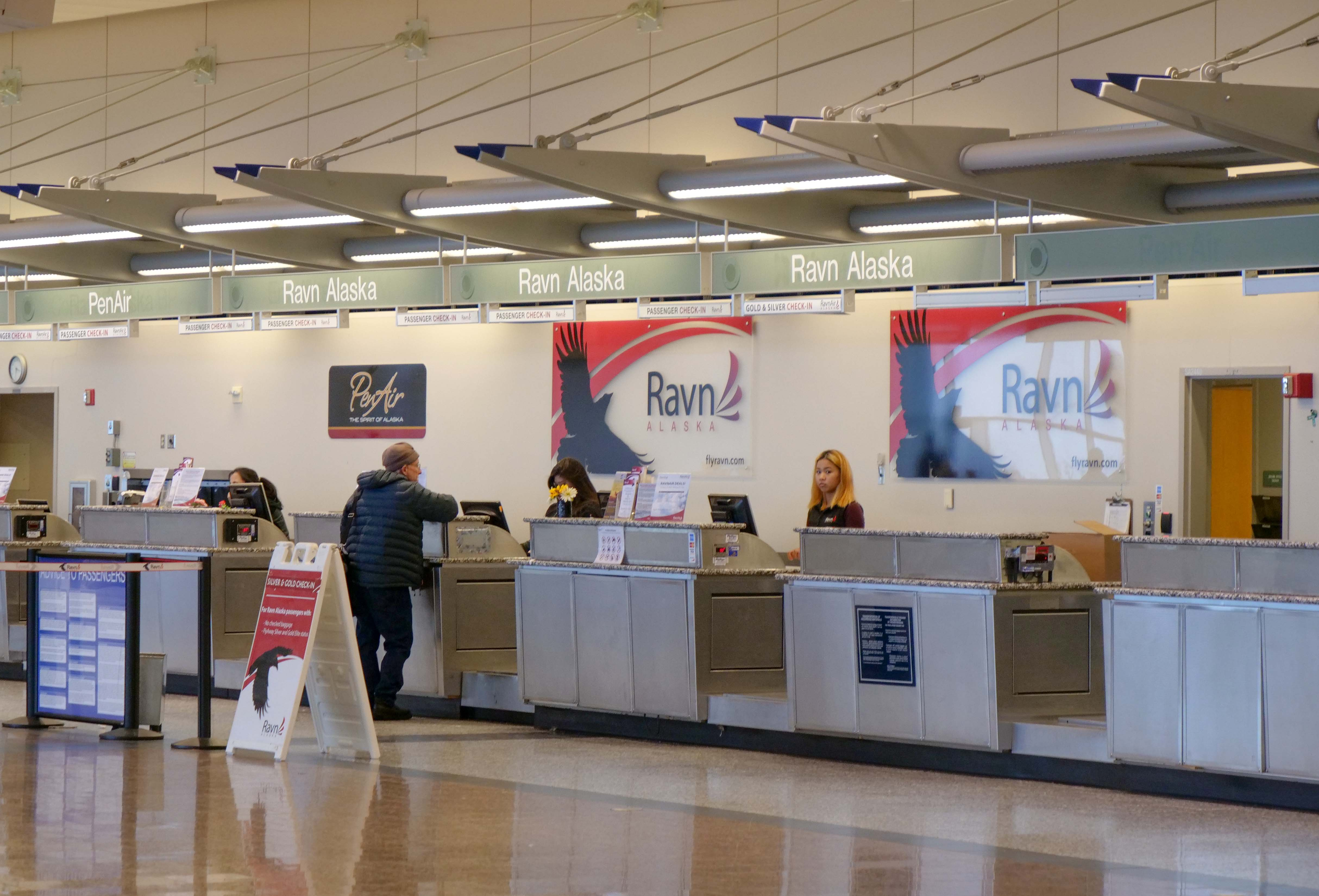
RavnAir's check-in counters in Anchorage

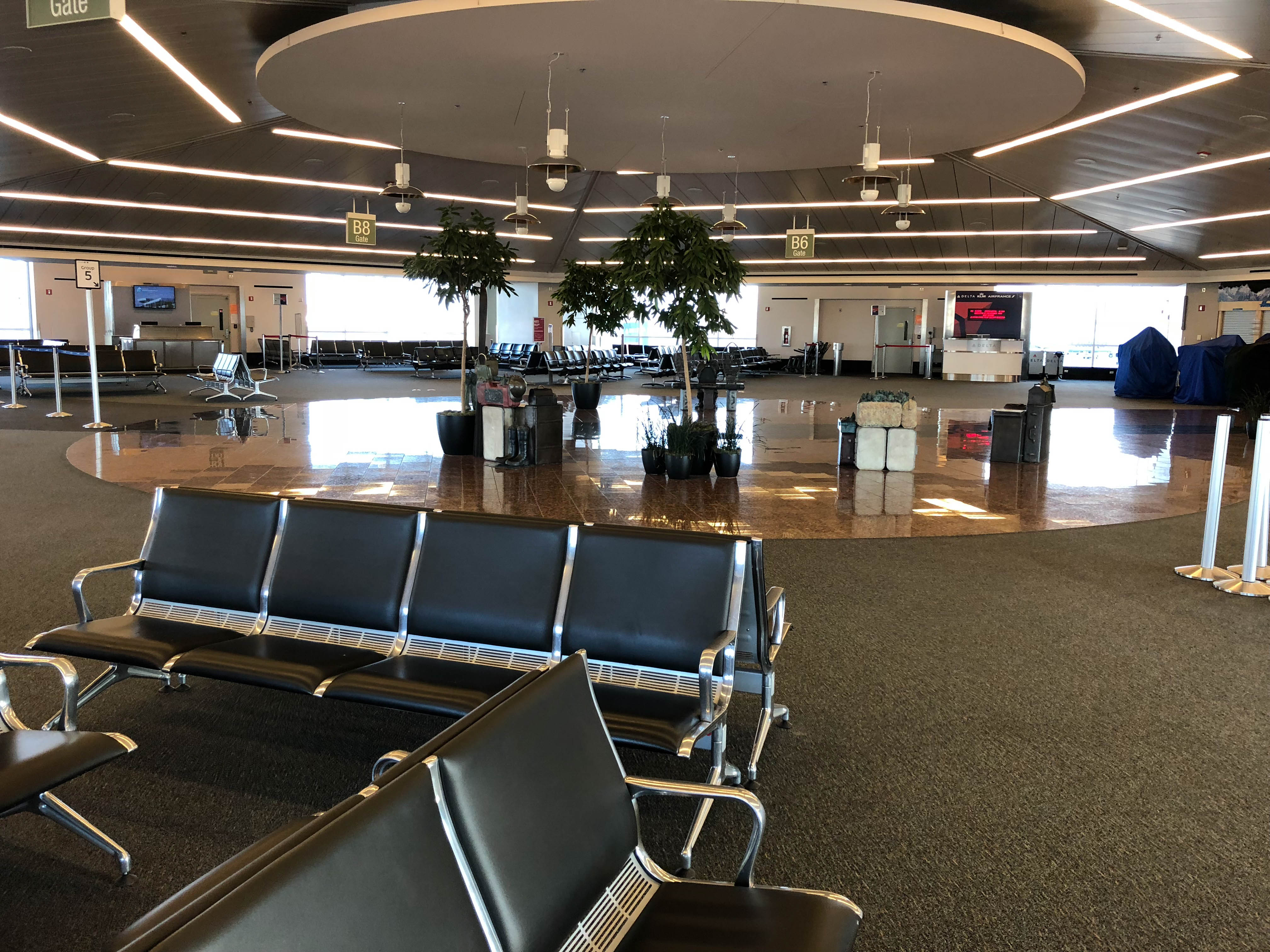
Panorama of gate

The South terminal contains three concourses: Concourse A, Concourse B, and Concourse C. The area of what is today Concourse C stood the original airport terminal constructed in the 1950s. A hexagonal satellite terminal was constructed across the main structure shortly afterwards. In 1969, the terminal underwent a major expansion, forming what is today Concourse B - notable new features included a curved arrival/departure structure with an elevated departure ramp for vehicles. The sweeping structure was designed to connect with the existing hexagonal satellite, now the end of Concourse B. In 1985, Concourse A was added. In 2009, this portion of the South terminal received seismic and aesthetic upgrades.

Concourse C was completely rebuilt in 2004, designed by McCool Carlson Green Architects, while Concourses A and B were built in 1985 and 1969 respectively and renovated in 2009. Architects HNTB and RIM Architects performed the architectural work for A/B Concourse. The south terminal also contains two L gates, numbered L1 and L2. These gates are outside security on the lower level and adjacent to Concourse A.

The North Terminal (international) serves Condor (Arrivals), all international seasonal charter flights, and military flights. In addition to these airlines, a few cargo airlines use the north side of the terminal for parking while their aircraft have small problems that need maintenance for a day or so. This terminal was built in 1982.

== Airlines and destinations ==
=== Passenger ===
Airlines	Destinations	Refs
Air Canada	Seasonal: Vancouver	
Alaska Airlines	Adak, Bethel, Cordova, Deadhorse, Dillingham, Fairbanks, Honolulu, Juneau, King Salmon, Kodiak, Kotzebue, Las Vegas, Los Angeles, Nome, Phoenix–Sky Harbor, Portland (OR), Seattle/Tacoma, Utqiagvik; Seasonal: Austin (begins June 12, 2027), Boise, Boston, Chicago–O'Hare, Dallas/Fort Worth (begins June 12, 2027), Denver, Kahului, Kailua-Kona, Minneapolis/St. Paul, Nashville (begins June 12, 2027), New York–JFK, Sacramento, Salt Lake City, San Diego, San Francisco, Spokane, Tokyo–Narita (begins May 13, 2027)	
Aleutian Airways	Cold Bay, Homer, Sand Point, St. Mary's (AK), St. Paul (AK), Unalakleet, Unalaska/Dutch Harbor; Seasonal: King Salmon	
American Airlines	Seasonal: Chicago–O'Hare, Dallas/Fort Worth, Phoenix–Sky Harbor	
Arctic Legacy Aviation	Gulkana, Seward, Valdez	
Condor	Seasonal: Frankfurt	
Delta Air Lines	Atlanta, Minneapolis/St. Paul, Seattle/Tacoma; Seasonal: Detroit, Salt Lake City	
Fox Air	Kenai	
Grant Aviation	Kenai	
Iliamna Air Taxi	Iliamna	
Katmai Air	Seasonal: King Salmon	
Ryan Air	Aniak	
Southwest Airlines	Seasonal: Denver, Las Vegas	
United Airlines	Denver; Seasonal: Chicago–O'Hare, Houston–Intercontinental, Newark, San Francisco, Washington–Dulles	
WestJet	Seasonal: Calgary	
Yute Commuter Service	Seasonal: Soldotna	

=== Destination maps ===
Alaska: 26 destinations

Contiguous United States (lower 48) and Canada: 24 destinations

Hawaii: 3 destinations

Europe: Frankfurt (seasonal)

=== Cargo ===
Airlines	Destinations
AirZeta	Chicago–O'Hare, New York–JFK, Seoul–Incheon
Alaska Air Cargo	Bethel, Cordova, Deadhorse, Dillingham, Juneau, King Salmon, Kotzebue, Nome, Seattle/Tacoma, Sitka, Utqiagvik
Amazon Air	Seattle/Tacoma
Awesome Cargo	Mexico City–AIFA, Seoul–Incheon
Cathay Cargo	Dallas/Fort Worth, Guadalajara, Hong Kong, Mexico City–AIFA
Central Airlines	Ontario, Shenzhen
China Airlines Cargo	Chicago–O'Hare, Taipei–Taoyuan
China Cargo Airlines	Chongqing, Toronto–Pearson
China Southern Cargo	Chicago–O'Hare, Guangzhou, Los Angeles, Shenzhen
Emirates SkyCargo	Chicago–O'Hare, Hanoi
Ethiopian Airlines Cargo	Seoul–Incheon
EVA Air Cargo	Taipei–Taoyuan
Everts Air Cargo	Aniak, Bethel, Dillingham, Galena, King Salmon, Kotzebue, Nome, Unalakleet
FedEx Express	Guam, Guangzhou, Indianapolis, Memphis, Newark, Oakland, Osaka–Kansai, Seoul–Incheon, Singapore, Taipei–Taoyuan, Tokyo–Narita
FedEx Feeder operated by Empire Airlines	Fairbanks, Homer, Kenai
Kalitta Air	Chicago–O'Hare, Tokyo–Narita
Korean Air Cargo	Atlanta, Chicago–O'Hare, Dallas/Fort Worth, Halifax, Los Angeles, Miami, New York–JFK, Seoul–Incheon, Shanghai–Pudong, Zhengzhou
Lynden Air Cargo	Bethel, Emmonak, Kotzebue, Nome, St. Mary's (AK)
Mas Air	Mexico City–AIFA, Seoul–Incheon, Wuxi
Nippon Cargo Airlines	Amsterdam, Chicago–O'Hare, Dallas/Fort Worth, Frankfurt, New York–JFK, Tokyo–Narita
Northern Air Cargo	Aniak, Bethel, Deadhorse, Dillingham, King Salmon, Kotzebue, Nome, Seattle/Tacoma, Unalakleet, Utqiagvik
SF Airlines	Ezhou, New York–JFK
Singapore Airlines Cargo	Dallas/Fort Worth, Hong Kong, Los Angeles
Suparna Airlines	Chicago–O'Hare, Mexico City–AIFA, Nanjing
UPS Airlines	Chicago/Rockford, Louisville, Ontario, Philadelphia

Countries with scheduled nonstop freighter service from Anchorage (★), as of October 2026

== Statistics ==
=== Top destinations ===
Busiest domestic routes from ANC (September 2025 – August 2026)
Rank	City	Passengers	Carriers
1	Seattle/Tacoma, Washington	836,050	Alaska, Delta
2	Portland, Oregon	209,734	Alaska
3	Fairbanks, Alaska	178,165	Alaska
4	Minneapolis/St. Paul, Minnesota	140,511	Alaska, Delta, Sun Country
5	Chicago–O'Hare, Illinois	113,289	Alaska, American, United
6	Denver, Colorado	109,469	Alaska, United
7	Juneau, Alaska	109,317	Alaska
8	Bethel, Alaska	81,545	Alaska
9	Kodiak, Alaska	78,047	Alaska
10	Dallas/Fort Worth, Texas	70,242	American

Busiest international routes from ANC (September 2025 – August 2026)
Rank	City	Passengers	Carriers
1	Vancouver, Canada	24,910	Air Canada, Air Canada Rogue
2	Calgary, Canada	4,348	Westjet
3	Frankfurt, Germany	3,024	Condor

=== Airline market share ===
Top airlines at ANC (September 2025 – August 2026)
Rank	Airline	Passengers	Percent of market share
1	Alaska Airlines	3,865,120	69.5%
2	Delta Air Lines	699,899	12.6%
3	United Airlines	404,163	7.3%
4	American Airlines	211,980	3.8%
5	Grant Aviation	129,903	2.3%
6	Other airlines	248,000	4.5%

== Ground transport ==
A shuttle bus runs approximately every 15 minutes between the North and South terminals and the employee and long-term parking lots. A land-side inter-terminal walkway was completed in 2009. Air-side connections between the sterile areas of each terminal are not available.

Route 40 of the Anchorage People Mover bus system serves the airport's North and South terminals every 15 minutes from 6:00 am to 7:30 pm on weekdays and every 30 minutes until 2:00am, as well as service every 30 minutes all day on Saturday and Sunday, connecting it with the downtown Transit Center.

Taxi queues are available in front of each terminal. Courtesy vans and other ground transportation options pick up from designated areas in front of each terminal.

Major national rental car chains are represented in an on-site consolidated rental car facility attached to the South terminal.

There is a rail station for the Alaska Railroad. It is only available during the summer season for cruise ship service. The depot opened in 2003 after funding was secured by United States Senator Ted Stevens, but commuter service never materialized.

== Renovations ==
Renovations began on the A and B concourses in fall 2006. These renovations are designed to bring the older portions into compliance with current seismic, heating, ventilation, electrical and safety codes, and also include new baggage handling systems and renovations to the interior of the concourses. Since the completion of the construction, all domestic flights are operated out of the South Terminal.

== Commissioned art pieces ==
- Euphony, 2004: glass artist – Warren Carther

The piece consists of nine towers of glass, collectively adding up to 42 m (138 ft) of span and reaching 8 m (26 ft) at its highest point. The series of panels are inspired by Alaska's immensely rugged landscape of glaciers and mountains. The ambiguous images embedded within the sculpture address Alaska's continual balancing of the forces of technology with the vast powers of the natural world.

== Programs ==
The airport features an innovative customer service program, which partners with most on-site (and some nearby) vendors and concessionaires. This volunteer, self-funded committee mystery shops at partnering companies provides awards of cash, free covered parking, and donated prizes to winning employees.

== Accidents and incidents ==
- On May 1, 1969, a Mobil Oil Canadair CL-44 on final approach to runway 6L at ANC, the undercarriage beam bogie snapped upon landing. The right wing and no. 3 and 4 engines struck the runway. The aircraft swerved onto the grass, breaking off the right wing. A fire erupted but all four occupants managed to escape. The probable cause was the co-pilot, who was conducting the landing, didn't level off correctly and supervision by the captain was inadequate. The aircraft was destroyed and written off.
- On October 1, 1970, Douglas R4D-6 N47 of the Federal Aviation Administration crashed shortly after take-off and was destroyed in the subsequent fire. The aircraft was operating a local training flight. Both crew members were killed.
- On November 27, 1970, Douglas DC-8-63 of Capitol Airlines crashed on takeoff from Anchorage, killing 47 of 229 passengers and crew on board, operating as Capitol Flight 3/26.
- On January 13, 1977, JAL Cargo Flight 8054, a McDonnell-Douglas DC-8-62F, crashed shortly after takeoff with a cargo of live beef cattle for delivery to Tokyo, Japan. The three crew members and the two cargo handlers aboard the aircraft died in the crash, and the aircraft was destroyed. The National Transportation Safety Board determined that the probable cause of the accident was a stall that resulted from the pilot's control inputs aggravated by airframe icing while the pilot was under the influence of alcohol.
- On December 4, 1978, a Learjet 25C en route from Juneau crashed upon landing. On board were Ann Stevens, wife of US Senator Ted Stevens; lobbyist and former Alaska Commissioner of Commerce and Economic Development (and future US Ambassador to Brazil) Langhorne A. Motley, prominent Anchorage lawyer Joseph Rudd, and three others. The party was travelling from the second-term inauguration of Alaska governor Jay Hammond to an Anchorage fundraiser organized by Motley. Motley and Ted Stevens were the only survivors.
- On June 8, 1983, Reeve Aleutian Airways Flight 8's propeller separated from the Lockheed L-188 Electra and tore a hole in the fuselage over the Pacific Ocean, causing explosive decompression and loss of control. The pilots managed to land the aircraft safely at Anchorage, and all 15 passengers and crew survived. Since the propeller fell into the sea the cause of the separation is undetermined.
- On December 23, 1983, the 1983 Anchorage runway collision occurred when Korean Air Lines Flight 084, a McDonnell Douglas DC-10 freighter bound for Los Angeles, attempted to take off on the wrong runway in dense fog and collided with SouthCentral Air Flight 59, a Piper PA-31 waiting to take off in the opposite direction. Both aircraft were destroyed, the three flight crew of the DC-10 were seriously injured, and three of the nine occupants of the PA-31 sustained minor injuries, but no fatalities resulted.
- On December 15, 1989, KLM Flight 867 entered a volcanic ash cloud after takeoff, created by an eruption from nearby Mount Redoubt. The flight suffered a complete loss of engine power and returned to make an emergency landing at Anchorage.
- On March 31, 1993, a Boeing 747-121, Japan Air Lines Flight 46E, operated by Evergreen International Airlines, departing Anchorage for Chicago, suffered a complete loss of the number 2 engine pylon at 2,000 ft after encountering severe-to-extreme turbulence after takeoff. The aircraft then experienced an uncommanded left bank of approximately 50 degrees. The flight crew successfully landed the aircraft back at Anchorage, to discover the number 2 engine and all of the leading edge of the wing between the number 1 and 2 engines had been torn away. The investigation found that the engine pylon had been weakened by metal fatigue cracking, which made the engine more susceptible to separation in severe turbulence.
- On October 9, 2002, a Boeing 747-451, Northwest Airlines Flight 85 en route from Detroit to Tokyo, suffered a lower rudder hardover. While flying over the Bering Sea, the aircraft abruptly went into a 35- through 40-degree left bank after the lower rudder had swung left 17° and hydraulic failure caused it to be stuck in place. Captain Frank Geib and First Officer Mike Fagan were at the controls at the time, having just taken over from Senior Captain John Hanson and First Officer David Smith. Geib declared an emergency and turned the aircraft back towards Anchorage. Hanson had returned to the cockpit and soon took over the controls. He and Fagan then flew the aircraft for over an hour before successfully landing in Anchorage. To steer the aircraft, they had to use asymmetric engine thrust or varying input into the engines as they were unable to use the ailerons at the time. No passengers or crew were injured, but the incident resulted in an airworthiness directive to prevent the possibility of a future accident.
- On November 30, 2018, the airport was hit by a magnitude 7.1 earthquake which shook the terminal and damaged buildings and the tower. FedEx 49 was on final approach to runway 7R when the quake hit. Tower ordered them to go around and FedEx 49 declared a missed approach. 117 people were injured in the terminal when the ceiling came down.
