= King Cove Airport =

- IATA: KVC; ICAO: PAVC; FAA LID: KVC

Summary
- Airport type: Public
- Owner: State of Alaska DOT&PF - Central Region
- Location: King Cove, Alaska
- Elevation AMSL: 155 ft (47 m)
- Coordinates: 55°06′59″N 162°15′58″W

Map
- Location of airport in Alaska

Runways
Direction	Length		Surface
Direction	ft	m	Surface
7/25	3,500	1,067	Gravel

Statistics (2005)
- Aircraft operations: 1,030
- Source: Federal Aviation Administration

King Cove Airport (IATA: KVC, ICAO: PAVC, FAA LID: KVC) is a state-owned public-use airport located four miles (6 km) northeast of the central business district of King Cove, a city in the Aleutians East Borough of the U.S. state of Alaska.

== Facilities and aircraft ==
King Cove Airport has one runway (7/25) with a gravel surface measuring 3,500 x 75 ft. (1,067 x 23 m). For the 12-month period ending December 31, 2005, the airport had 1,030 aircraft operations: 71% air taxi and 29% general aviation.

== Airlines and destinations ==
Airlines	Destinations
Grant Aviation	Cold Bay, False Pass

== See also ==
- List of airports in Alaska
