= Pacific Northern Airlines =

Alaska jet carrier, merged with Western Airlines 1932–1967

Pacific Northern Airlines Woodley Airways
IATA	ICAO	Call sign
PN^{(1)}	PN^{(1)}	—
- Commenced operations: April 10, 1932 as Woodley Airways; 17 December 1945 as Pacific Northern Airlines
- Ceased operations: July 1, 1967 merged into Western Air Lines
- Fleet size: See Fleet below
- Destinations: See Destinations below
- Headquarters: Seattle, Washington from 1951; Anchorage, Alaska until 1951; United States
- Founder: Arthur G. Woodley
- Employees: 830

Notes
- (1) IATA, ICAO codes were the same until the 1980s

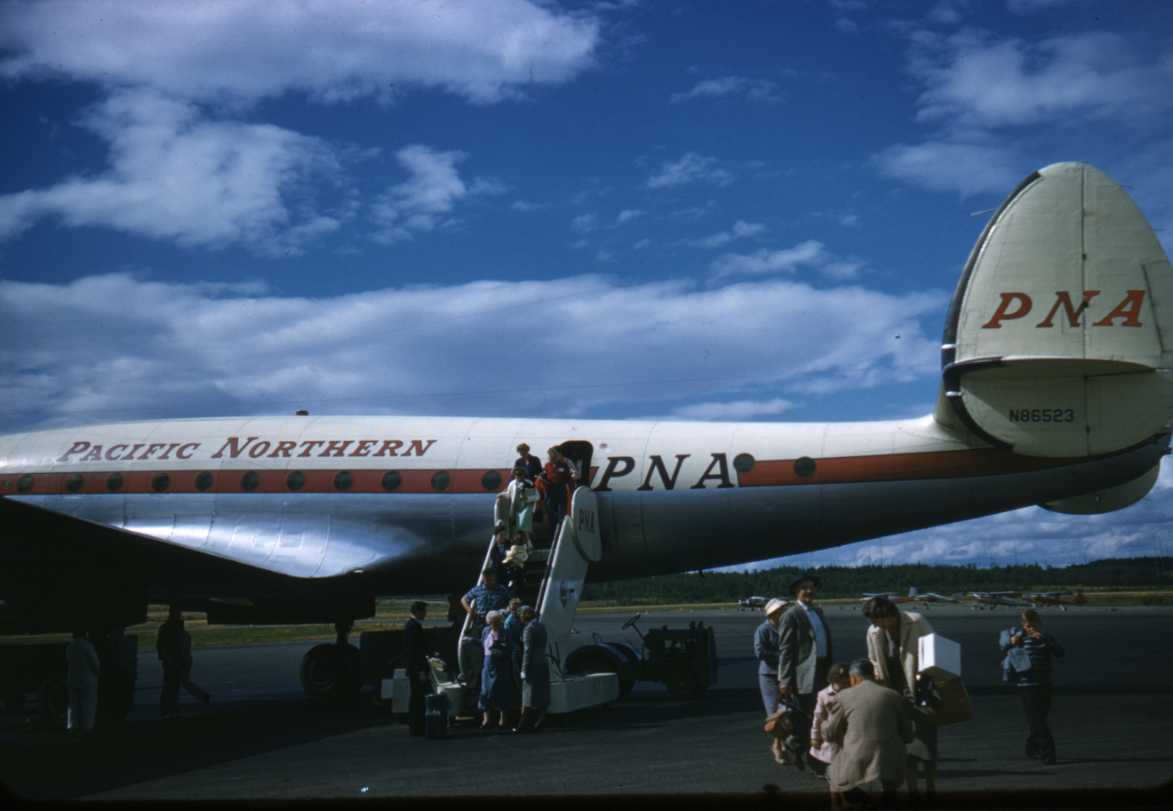
L-749 Constellation at Anchorage, around 1958. This aircraft (N86523) was written off in an accident at Kenai in 1966

Pacific Northern Airlines (PNA) was an Alaska carrier operating jets as well as larger piston engine aircraft, a category of airline certificated by the Civil Aeronautics Board (CAB), the Federal agency that, at the time, tightly regulated US air transportation. The airline started in 1932 as Woodley Airways, a sole proprietorship of founder Arthur G. Woodley, who remained in control of the airline through its sale to Western Air Lines in 1967, by which time it had extended its service beyond southern Alaska to Seattle.

== History ==
=== Woodley Airways ===
Woodley Airways initially operated charter services in Alaska including flights between Anchorage and Nome piloting his own Bellanca single engine aircraft. Woodley charged customers $150 for the five and half hour flight; the month-long sled trip cost $750. In 1942, the CAB certificated Woodley as a then-territorial carrier (Alaska not yet being a state). Under a wartime exemption order, the CAB gave Woodley temporary authority to fly from Anchorage to Juneau in 1943, cementing its southern Alaska orientation. In 1946, the CAB made this authority permanent.

=== Transition to PNA and Seattle ===
In 1945 Woodley Airways changed its name to Pacific Northern Airlines (PNA), originally a partnership between Woodley, his wife and his office manager. Woodley then created a corporation of the same name, to which the airline certificate was transferred in 1947. In 1951, the CAB authorized PNA to serve Seattle and Portland, Oregon; President Truman intervened in the case to also authorize Alaska Airlines to serve Seattle, something the CAB had rejected in its initial decision. Truman cited national security and the need to better connect Alaska with the US mainland. Also in 1951, PNA moved its general offices (headquarters) from Anchorage to Seattle. In 1953, Pacific Northern became publicly-traded.

In April 1961, PNA ordered two Boeing 720s, which were delivered in March and April 1962. A third B-720 was bought from Braniff in 1966.

=== Competition issue ===
The addition of Alaska Airlines left four carriers flying between Alaska and Seattle/Portland: PNA, Alaska Airlines, Pan Am and Northwest Airlines. The four airlines lost money on the route. Over the years, the CAB urged PNA and Alaska Airlines to merge to fix the issue but the CAB could not force mergers. Consequently, the CAB paid a subsidy of around $4 million per year between PNA and Alaska Airlines, with about 75% of it to cover losses on the Seattle/Portland-Alaska route. Finally, in June 1965, to stem losses, the CAB changed route authorities to minimize head-to-head competition. It considered more drastic action (such as kicking an airline off the route entirely) but settled for changes such as: PNA lost access to Portland, Alaska Airlines could no longer fly nonstop from Fairbanks to Seattle (but had to fly one-stop via Anchorage), Pan Am lost access to Juneau. In the wake of the decision, the industry speculated about mergers. Alaska Airlines president Charles Willis said the merger between his carrier and Woodley's made the most sense, "it is just a matter of when the other party is willing to discuss it." The problem was that Woodley disliked Willis intensely.

Also in 1965, PNA ordered four Boeing 727s for delivery in 1966, with the intention to become all-jet. But PNA was unable to finance them, and flipped them to Braniff as part of the deal that brought PNA the ex-Braniff Boeing 720 mentioned earlier. This was the context for the decision to merge with Western.

Pacific Northern Airlines - Western Air Lines route networks at time of merger, from PNA 1966 Annual Report

=== Merger with Western ===
At the time, Western Air Lines flew up the west coast of the North America from Mexico to Seattle; adding PNA was a natural extension of its system. Further, like PNA, Western flew the Boeing 720. In 1966 Western made a 20.5% operating margin on revenues of $156 million, boosted by a strike at competitors, but its 1965 operating margin was a still-impressive 18.6%. PNA was the leading Alaska carrier, bigger than Alaska Airlines, with 1966 revenues of $21 million. In 1966 PNA was also significantly more profitable than Alaska. The merger was announced at the end of October 1966 and the CAB approved it by early June 1967, with it becoming official July 1.

== Destinations ==
1 October 1965: Bold indicates Boeing 720 jet service:

- **Anchorage, AK**
- Cordova, AK
- Homer, AK
- **Juneau, AK**
- Kenai, AK
- **Ketchikan, AK** (served via the Annette Island Airport)
- King Salmon, AK
- Kodiak, AK
- **Seattle/Tacoma** (served via the Seattle-Tacoma International Airport)
- Yakutat, AK

== Fleet ==
Especially in its earlier years, Woodley/PNA flew a diverse fleet. Aside from the types listed below, External links has photos of Woodley or PNA Stinson Model A, Travel Air S-6000-B, Curtiss-Wright 6-B, Boeing 247D and Noorduyn Norseman aircraft.

1 January 1949:

- 1 Douglas DC-4
- 3 Douglas DC-3

9 March 1959:

- 3 Lockheed L-749 Constellation
- 2 Douglas DC-4
- 4 Douglas DC-3

1 July 1967:

- 3 Boeing 720
- 6 Lockheed L-749 Constellation
- 1 Douglas DC-3

== Accidents and incidents ==
- 19 January 1943: Woodley Airways Stinson Model A NC14566. Pilot drowned after ditching in the Gastineau Channel near Juneau. The aircraft was prepped for a flight from Juneau to Anchorage but one of three engines would not start. The pilot deplaned passengers and took off to try to start the engine by windmilling it, but entered the Channel (which has mountains on both sides) and was caught in a violent wind condition specific to it. External links has a picture of the aircraft involved in this accident.
- 14 June 1960: Pacific Northern flight PN201, Lockheed L-749A Constellation N1554V crashed into Mount Gilbert at 9,000 ft after deviating from its planned route, killing all aboard (five crew, nine passengers). The pilots were cited for failing to navigate properly using instruments available to them, but the CAB also noted the flight was tracked by Air Defense Radar, but operators failed to notify the aircraft or civilian air traffic control that the flight was in danger, despite an agreement between the military and civilian authorities to do so.
- 6 June 1966: Pacific Northern Lockheed L-749A Constellation N86523 scrapped after a hard landing at Kenai.

== See also ==
- List of defunct airlines of the United States
- Western Airlines
