= Kenai Municipal Airport =

Airport in Alaska, United States

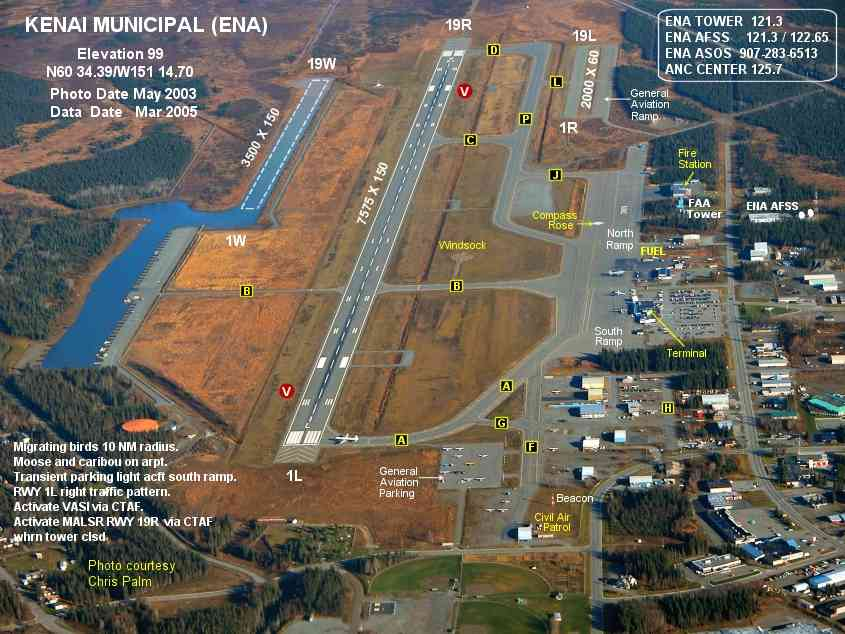
- IATA: ENA; ICAO: PAEN; FAA LID: ENA

Summary
- Airport type: Public
- Owner: City of Kenai
- Serves: Kenai, Alaska
- Elevation AMSL: 99 ft (30 m)
- Coordinates: 60°34′24″N 151°14′41″W
- Website: www.kenaiairport.com

Map
- Location of airport in Alaska

Runways
Direction	Length		Surface
Direction	ft	m	Surface
2L/20R	7,855	2,394	Asphalt
2R/20L	1,980	604	Gravel
2W/20W	4,600	1,402	Water

Helipads
Number	Length		Surface
Number	ft	m	Surface
H1	100	30	Asphalt
H2	100	30	Asphalt

Statistics (2014)
- Aircraft operations: 38,960
- Based aircraft: 61
- Source: Federal Aviation Administration

Kenai Municipal Airport (IATA: ENA, ICAO: PAEN, FAA LID: ENA) is a city-owned, public-use airport located in Kenai, a city in the Kenai Peninsula Borough of the U.S. state of Alaska.

Per Federal Aviation Administration records, the airport had 96,565 passenger boardings (enplanements) in calendar year 2008, 82,277 enplanements in 2009, and 86,857 in 2010. It is included in the National Plan of Integrated Airport Systems for 2011–2015, which categorized it as a primary commercial service airport (more than 10,000 enplanements per year).

== Facilities and aircraft ==
Kenai Municipal Airport covers an area of 1,200 acres (486 ha) at an elevation of 99 feet (30 m) above mean sea level. It has two runways: 2L/20R with a 7,855 by 150 feet (2,394 x 46 m) asphalt pavement and 2R/20L with a 1980 by 75 feet (604 x 23 m) gravel surface. It also has a seaplane landing area designated 2W/20W which measures 4,600 by 252 feet (1,402 x 77 m). In addition, the airport has two asphalt helipads that are 100 by 100 feet (30 x 30 m).

For the 12-month period ending December 1, 2011, the airport had 40,178 aircraft operations, an average of 110 per day: 58% air taxi, 32% general aviation, 8% military, and 3% scheduled commercial. At that time there were 61 aircraft based at this airport: 88.5% single-engine and 11.5% multi-engine.

== Airlines and destinations ==
The following airlines offer scheduled passenger service:

Airlines	Destinations
Grant Aviation	Anchorage
Fox Air	Anchorage

=== Statistics ===
Top airlines at ENA (September 2021 - August 2022)
Rank	Airline	Passengers	Percent of market share
1	Ravn Alaska	72,950	54.92%
2	Grant Aviation	52,380	39.44%
3	Corvus Airlines	7,410	5.58%
4	Iliamna Air Taxi	90	0.07%

Top domestic destinations (Sep. 2021 - Aug. 2022)
Rank	City	Airport	Passengers	Carriers
1	Anchorage, AK	Ted Stevens Anchorage International Airport	67,420	Grant, Ravn Alaska
2	Iliamna, AK	Iliamna Airport	30	

== Historical airline service ==
Pacific Northern Airlines (PNA, the successor to Woodley Airways which began operations in Alaska in 1932) was serving the airport in 1955 with Douglas DC-3 service operated twice daily on a southbound routing of Anchorage - Kenai - Homer, AK - Kodiak, AK as well as a northbound DC-3 service operated daily on a routing of Dillingham, AK - Naknek, AK/King Salmon, AK - Iliamna, AK - Kenai - Anchorage and also northbound DC-3 flights operated twice a week Kodiak - Homer - Kenai - Anchorage. By 1965, Pacific Northern was operating three nonstop flights on a daily basis from Kenai to Anchorage with DC-3 as well as four engine Lockheed Constellation propliners with the Constellation service operating a roundtrip Anchorage - Kenai - Homer - Kodiak routing six days a week as well. Also in 1965, Pacific Northern was offering direct connecting Constellation and DC-3 service via Anchorage to its Boeing 720 jetliner flights to Seattle (SEA). In 1967, Western Airlines, a major air carrier based in Los Angeles, acquired Pacific Northern and continued to serve Kenai following the merger of the two airlines with Constellation propliners flying four times a day nonstop to Anchorage with one of these Constellation flights also operating daily roundtrip Anchorage - Kenai - Homer - Kodiak service. In 1968, Western was offering direct connecting Constellation service from Kenai via Anchorage to its Boeing 720 and Boeing 720B jetliner flights from ANC to Seattle (SEA), San Francisco (SFO) and Los Angeles (LAX). Western was still serving Kenai in 1970 and operated four engine Lockheed L-188 Electra turboprops into the airport at one point; however, Western then ceased serving Kenai during the early 1970s.

=== Historical airline jet service ===
During the late 1970s and early 1980s, the airport had scheduled passenger jet service to Seattle (SEA). In 1979, Wien Air Alaska was operating nonstop flights to Seattle three days a week with Boeing 737-200 jetliners. By 1981, Wien Air Alaska was flying daily direct Boeing 737-200 service to Seattle via an intermediate stop in Anchorage (ANC). Wien then discontinued jet service into the airport and by 1984 was only flying nonstop service to Anchorage with all flights operated with commuter turboprop aircraft.

== History ==
The airport was initially constructed by the US Army under Air Navigation Site Withdrawal No. 156 in 1941 with a 5,000' runway completed by the Civil Air Patrol in 1942. The first terminal building was constructed in 1952, north of the highway spur next to the cemetery.

During the Korean War era the US Air Force maintained jet fighters at the airport and provided maintenance via an agreement with the FAA. The USAF agreement ended in 1962, but the Air Force still retains four airport-adjacent tracts of land.

In 1963 2,000 acres encompassing the airport and lands were transferred to the City of Kenai by the FAA. The current terminal was built in 1966, with some remodeling in the '80s.

In 1973 an FAA control tower was added for increased safety and to permit additional equipment to use the facility.

In 1984 commercial flights to Seattle ended. Currently only commuter flights to Anchorage are scheduled.

The last large commercial jetliner landed in March, 2014, when a massive snow storm completely closed Anchorage International causing United Airlines Flight 1425 (a Boeing 737) from Chicago to be diverted to Kenai, staying overnight to allow the pilots to complete mandatory rest.

== See also ==
- List of airports in Alaska
