= Nelson Lagoon Airport =

Airport in Alaska, United States

- IATA: NLG; ICAO: PAOU; FAA LID: OUL

Summary
- Airport type: Public
- Owner: Alaska DOT&PF - Central Region
- Serves: Nelson Lagoon, Alaska
- Elevation AMSL: 14 ft (4.3 m)
- Coordinates: 56°00′27″N 161°09′37″W

Map
- Location of airport in Alaska

Runways
Direction	Length		Surface
Direction	ft	m	Surface
8/26	4,000	1,219	Gravel

Statistics (2005)
- Aircraft operations: 302
- Enplanements (2008): 290
- Source: Federal Aviation Administration

Nelson Lagoon Airport (IATA: NLG, ICAO: PAOU, FAA LID: OUL, formerly Z73) is a state-owned, public-use airport located one nautical mile (1.85 km) east of the central business district of Nelson Lagoon, in the Aleutians East Borough of the U.S. state of Alaska. Scheduled airline service to Cold Bay Airport is provided by Peninsula Airways (PenAir).

As per Federal Aviation Administration records, this airport had 290 commercial passenger boardings (enplanements) in calendar year 2008, a decrease of 4% from the 302 enplanements in 2007. Nelson Lagoon Airport is included in the FAA's National Plan of Integrated Airport Systems (2009-2013), which categorizes it as a general aviation facility.

Although most U.S. airports use the same three-letter location identifier for the FAA and IATA, this airport is assigned OUL by the FAA and NLG by the IATA (which assigned OUL to Oulu Airport in Oulu, Finland).

== Airlines and destinations ==
Airlines	Destinations
Grant Aviation	Cold Bay, Port Moller

== Facilities and aircraft ==
Nelson Lagoon Airport has one runway designated 8/26 with a gravel surface measuring 4,000 by 75 feet (1,219 x 23 m). For the 12-month period ending December 31, 2005, the airport had 302 aircraft operations, an average of 25 per month: 68% air taxi and 32% general aviation.

== See also ==
- List of airports in Alaska
