= Posterior amorphous corneal dystrophy =

Human disease

- Specialty: Ophthalmology

Posterior amorphous corneal dystrophy (PACD) is a rare form of corneal dystrophy. It is not yet linked to any chromosomal locus. The first report describing this dystrophy dates back to 1977.
