= Cold Bay Airport =

Airport in Alaska, United States

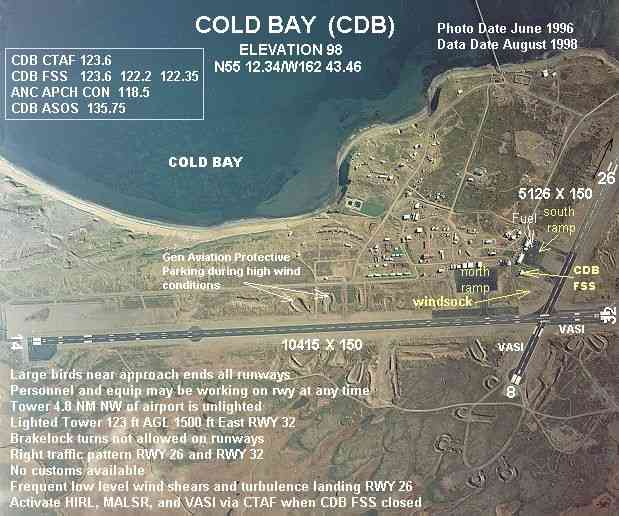
- IATA: CDB; ICAO: PACD; FAA LID: CDB; WMO: 70316

Summary
- Airport type: Public
- Owner: State of Alaska DOT&PF - Central Region
- Serves: Cold Bay, Alaska
- Elevation AMSL: 101 ft (31 m)
- Coordinates: 55°12′19″N 162°43′28″W

Map
- Location of airport in Alaska

Runways
Direction	Length		Surface
Direction	ft	m	Surface
15/33	10,180	3,103	Asphalt
8/26	4,900	1,494	Asphalt

Statistics (2016)
- Aircraft operations: 9,090
- Based aircraft: 0
- Passengers: 14,479
- Freight: 3,017,000 lbs
- Source: Federal Aviation Administration

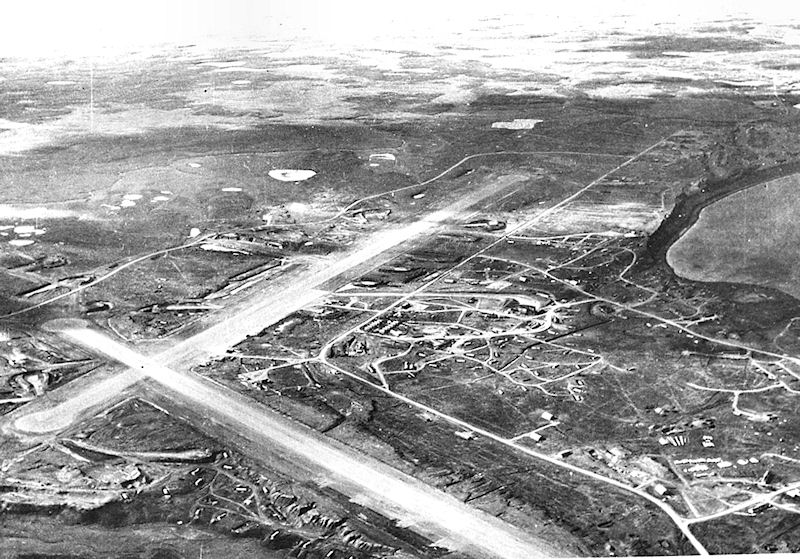
The airfield at Cold Bay, 1942, later named Fort Randall AAF, then Thornbrough Field

Cold Bay Airport (IATA: CDB, ICAO: PACD, FAA LID: CDB) is a state owned, public use airport located in Cold Bay, a city in the Aleutians East Borough of the U.S. state of Alaska. First built as a United States Army Air Forces airfield during World War II, it is one of the main airports serving the Alaska Peninsula. Scheduled passenger service is available and air taxi operators fly in and out of the airport daily. Formerly, the airport operated as Thornbrough Air Force Base.

According to Federal Aviation Administration (FAA) records, the airport had 9,105 passenger boardings (enplanements) in calendar year 2008, 8,968 enplanements in 2009, and 9,261 in 2010. It is included in the National Plan of Integrated Airport Systems for 2011–2015, which categorized it as a "non-primary commercial service" airport, meaning it has between 2,500 and 10,000 enplanements per year.

Cold Bay's main runway is the fifth-largest in Alaska and was built during World War II. Today, it is used for scheduled cargo flights by Alaska Central Express and is sometimes used as an emergency diversion airport for passenger flights crossing the Pacific Ocean.

A myth describes Cold Bay Airport as an alternate landing site for Space Shuttles, but the National Aeronautics and Space Administration (NASA) has stated that it was never so designated, and it was not within the entry crossrange capability of Space Shuttles.

There is a National Weather Service (NWS) office (which sends up radiosonde balloons twice a day) colocated with the FAA Flight Service Station at the airport. The NWS ranks Cold Bay as the cloudiest city in the United States.

== History ==
The airport was constructed during World War II as Fort Randall Army Airfield, eventually becoming an Air Force base during the Cold War.

== Facilities and aircraft ==
Cold Bay Airport covers 2,213 acres (896 ha) and has two asphalt paved runways: 15/33 is 10,180 by 150 feet (3,174 x 46 m) and 8/26 is 4,900 by 150 feet (1,494 x 46 m). For the 12-month period ending October 30, 2017, the airport had 9,090 aircraft operations, an average of 25 per day: 63% air taxi, 30% scheduled commercial, 5% military, and 2% general aviation.

== Airlines and destinations ==
The following airlines offer scheduled passenger service at this airport:

Airlines	Destinations
Aleutian Airways	Anchorage
Grant Aviation	False Pass, King Cove, Nelson Lagoon, St. George, Sand Point, Unalaska/Dutch Harbor

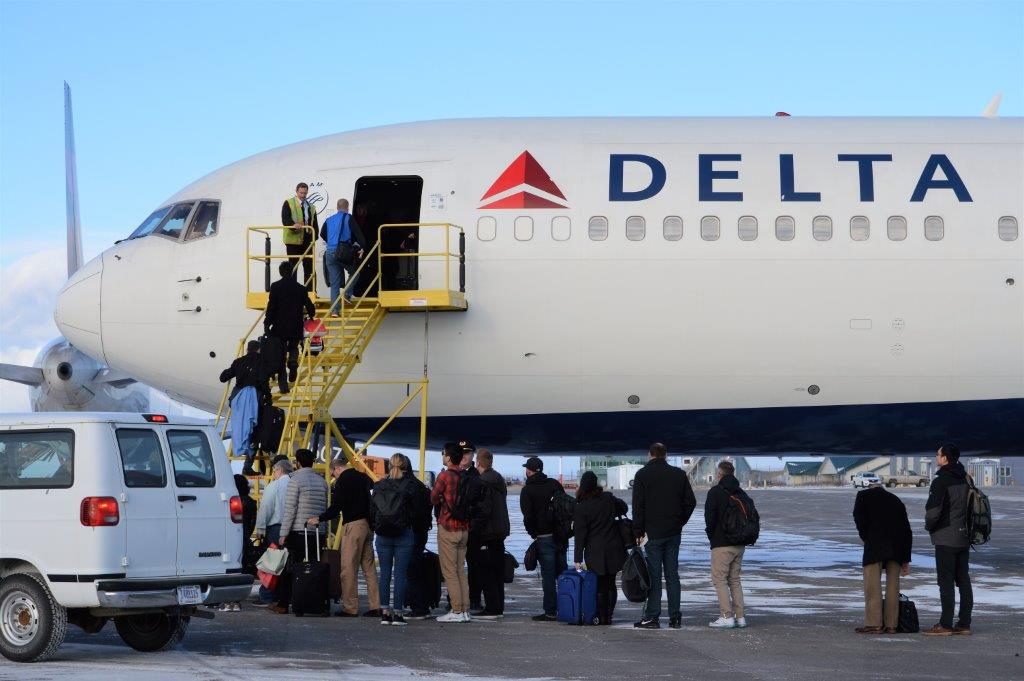
Passengers boarding a Boeing 767 to complete their flight to Portland after their flight was diverted due to an engine issue with the first aircraft

=== Historical airline service ===
Reeve Aleutian Airways (RAA) served Cold Bay with scheduled passenger flights for many years. During the 1970s and 1980s, Reeve was operating nonstop flights to Anchorage (ANC) with Lockheed L-188 Electra and NAMC YS-11 turboprop aircraft. Reeve was also operating Electra propjet service nonstop to Seattle (SEA) on a three flights per week schedule in 1979. By 1989, the airline had introduced nonstop jet service to Anchorage operated with Boeing 727-100 combi aircraft which were capable of transporting both passengers and freight on the main deck of the aircraft in addition to continuing to operate nonstop Electra service to Anchorage as well. Reeve was continuing to operate 727 jet service nonstop to Anchorage during the late 1990s before ceasing all flight operations in 2000. From 2020 until the summer of 2021, Alaska Airlines flights to and from Adak would stop in Cold Bay to assist passengers with the shutdown of commuter flights from Anchorage to Cold Bay and Unalaska.

== Statistics ==
=== Top destinations ===
Busiest domestic routes from CDB (December 2021 - November 2022)
Rank	City	Passengers	Airline
1	Anchorage, Alaska	2,300	Ravn Alaska
2	King Cove, Alaska	600	Grant Aviation
3	Sand Point, Alaska	60	Grant Aviation
4	False Pass, Alaska	50	Grant Aviation
5	Nelson Lagoon, Alaska	30	Grant Aviation

=== Airline market share ===
Largest airlines at CBD (December 2021 - November 2022)
Rank	Airline	Passengers	Share
1	Ravn Alaska	4,800	79.05%
2	Grant Aviation	1,300	20.95%

== Accidents and incidents ==
- September 8, 1973: World Airways Flight 802, a Douglas DC-8 operating on a cargo flight for the Military Airlift Command, crashed into Mount Dutton, 16 miles (26 km) east of Cold Bay, while on instrument approach to the airport. All six people on board were killed.
- June 8, 1983: Reeve Aleutian Airways Flight 8, a Lockheed L-188 Electra with 15 people on board, lost one of its propellers shortly after takeoff from the airport, causing damage which depressurized the airliner and jammed its flight controls and engine throttles. Needing a longer runway than Cold Bay to land safely, the crew managed to land the aircraft at Anchorage International Airport, Alaska, without injury to anyone.

== See also ==
- List of airports in Alaska
