= Cold Bay, Alaska =

City in Alaska, United States

Cold Bay, Alaska Udaamagax, Pualu
- City
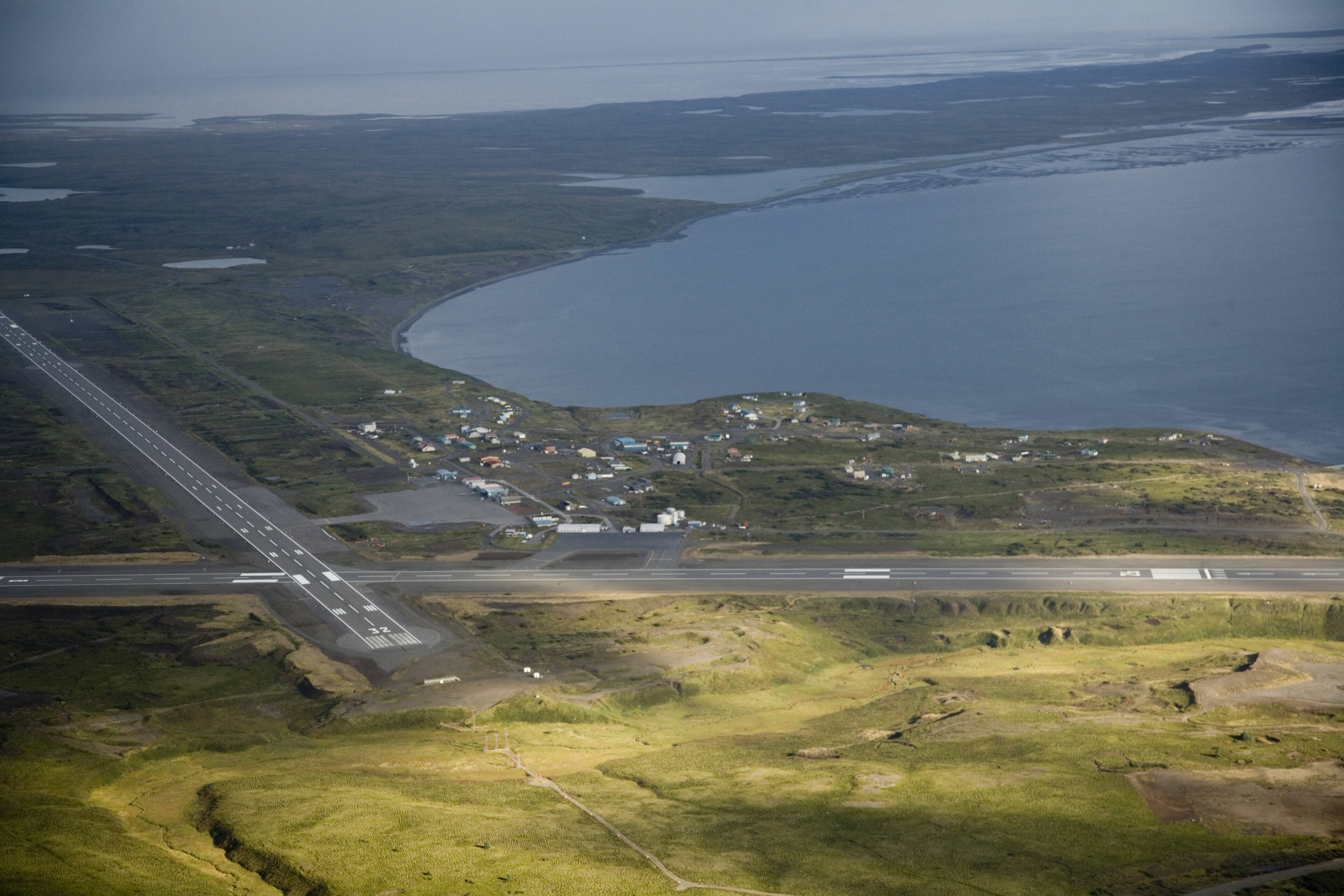
- Aerial view of Cold Bay taken during the early 21st century. Cold Bay Airport's runways are visible.

- Seal
- Motto(s): "Wildlife, fishing, hunting, and a world of opportunity"
- Location in Alaska
- Coordinates: 55°12′33″N 162°42′51″W
- Country: United States
- State: Alaska
- Borough: Aleutians East
- Incorporated: January 1982

Government
  - Type: Mayor–council
  - Mayor: Rob Walker
  - Borough mayor: Alvin D. Osterback
  - State senator: Lyman Hoffman (D)
  - State rep.: Bryce Edgmon (I)

Area
  - Total: 68.05 sq mi (176.26 km^{2})
  - Land: 53.41 sq mi (138.34 km^{2})
  - Water: 14.64 sq mi (37.92 km^{2})
- Elevation: 138 ft (42 m)

Population (2020)
  - Total: 50
  - Density: 0.93/sq mi (0.36/km^{2})
- Time zone: UTC−9 (Alaska (AKST))
  - Summer (DST): UTC−8 (AKDT)
- ZIP code: 99571
- Area code: 907 (local prefix: 532)
- FIPS code: 02-16530
- GNIS feature ID: 1418448
- Website: www.coldbayak.org

Cold Bay (Aleut: Udaamagax,; Sugpiaq: Pualu) is a city in Aleutians East Borough, Alaska, United States. As of the 2010 census, the population was 108, but at the 2020 census this had reduced to 50.

Cold Bay is one of the main commercial centers of the Alaska Peninsula, which extends west towards the Aleutian Islands, and is home to Cold Bay Airport.

== History ==
There is evidence of prehistoric occupation by Aleuts and later Russian encampments. Cold Bay's significance to American history began with the Japanese invasion of the Aleutians in World War II. General Simon Bolivar Buckner, Jr. ordered the creation of Fort Randall, an airbase on the shores of Cold Bay, in 1942 as a part of a general expansion of American assets in the Aleutians. It (along with Otter Point) served as a base for the 11th Air Force to provide protection to the only deep water port in the Aleutians at the time, Dutch Harbor.

This protection was necessary when during Yamamoto's Midway Campaign, a diversionary attack was launched against Dutch Harbor. The initial attack was repulsed by the surprise presence of P-40s stationed here. A second larger attack with its own fighter escort the next day caused minor damage. Later, with the victory in the Pacific, the forces grew to 20,000 troops. The quonset huts used to house this massive encampment still stand around the community. It also was a base of operations for the US Navy with the seaplane tender USS Casco (AVP-12) among the ships based in Cold Bay.

In the spring and summer of 1945, Cold Bay was the site of the largest and most ambitious transfer program of World War II, Project Hula, in which the United States transferred dozens of ships and craft to the Soviet Union and trained Soviet personnel in their operation in anticipation of the Soviet Union entering the war against Japan.

In later decades, control of the airfield passed to civil authorities, who maintained it as a useful refueling and emergency landing location for great circle flights from the west coast of the United States to East Asia. A Distant Early Warning Line station established nearby was eventually decommissioned.

During the 1980s, deregulation of the airline industry under President Ronald Reagan caused many of the compelling interests supporting the need for the community to evaporate. Today, Cold Bay is still occasionally used for emergency or precautionary landings of commercial flights, and is also a hub for traffic from Anchorage and Seattle to the small communities around it.

== Geography ==
Cold Bay is located at 55°12′33″N 162°42′51″W (55.209038, -162.714298). It is west of Hawaii.

According to the U.S. Census Bureau, the city has a total area of 70.9 square miles (184 km^{2}), of which, 54.4 square miles (141 km^{2}) of it is land and 16.6 square miles (43 km^{2}) of it (23.34%) is water.

Cold Bay holds the record for most overcast community in America.

=== Climate ===
Climate chart for Cold Bay

Cold Bay has an either an ocean-moderated subarctic climate (Köppen climate classification: Dfc) if the 0 °C isotherm is used, or a subpolar oceanic climate (Köppen climate classification: Cfc) if the −3 °C (26.6 °F) isotherm is used, both of those climate being typical of southwest Alaska, though the summers are almost cool enough to qualify as a tundra (Köppen climate classification: ET). Cold Bay is considered the cloudiest place in the United States, with an average of 304 days of heavy overcast (covering over 3/4 of the sky).

Cold Bay's recorded temperature range is between 78 °F (26 °C) and −13 °F (−25 °C). The coldest daytime maximum on record is 0 °F (−18 °C), while the annual coldest maximum between 1991 and 2020 was at 16 °F (−9 °C). With warm summer days being rare, nights remain chilly also during the warmer season. The warmest recorded overnight low is at a very modest 57 °F (14 °C) and the annual average warmest night tends to fall to 53 °F (12 °C). Many years fail to break 68 °F (20 °C) during the warmest afternoon.

Climate data for Cold Bay Airport, Alaska (1991–2020 normals, (Note: Mean monthly maxima and minima (i.e. the highest and lowest temperature readings during an entire month or year) calculated based on data at said location from 1991 to 2020.) extremes 1942–present (Note: Records for Cold Bay have been kept at the Cold Bay Airport since March 1950 and at Thornbrough Air Force Base from June 1942 to February 1950. For more information, see ThreadEx))
Month	Jan	Feb	Mar	Apr	May	Jun	Jul	Aug	Sep	Oct	Nov	Dec	Year
Record high °F (°C)	59 (15)	54 (12)	56 (13)	60 (16)	68 (20)	72 (22)	77 (25)	78 (26)	70 (21)	69 (21)	59 (15)	62 (17)	78 (26)
Mean maximum °F (°C)	43.5 (6.4)	43.9 (6.6)	44.6 (7.0)	49.7 (9.8)	56.2 (13.4)	61.2 (16.2)	64.7 (18.2)	65.8 (18.8)	60.1 (15.6)	54.7 (12.6)	49.2 (9.6)	45.2 (7.3)	67.7 (19.8)
Mean daily maximum °F (°C)	33.2 (0.7)	35.0 (1.7)	35.4 (1.9)	40.2 (4.6)	46.5 (8.1)	52.1 (11.2)	56.2 (13.4)	57.2 (14.0)	53.4 (11.9)	46.5 (8.1)	39.9 (4.4)	35.6 (2.0)	44.3 (6.8)
Daily mean °F (°C)	28.4 (−2.0)	30.2 (−1.0)	29.9 (−1.2)	35.0 (1.7)	41.0 (5.0)	47.1 (8.4)	51.5 (10.8)	52.6 (11.4)	48.4 (9.1)	41.3 (5.2)	35.3 (1.8)	30.8 (−0.7)	39.3 (4.1)
Mean daily minimum °F (°C)	23.7 (−4.6)	25.5 (−3.6)	24.4 (−4.2)	29.8 (−1.2)	35.5 (1.9)	42.0 (5.6)	46.9 (8.3)	48.1 (8.9)	43.4 (6.3)	36.1 (2.3)	30.6 (−0.8)	25.9 (−3.4)	34.3 (1.3)
Mean minimum °F (°C)	6.7 (−14.1)	8.2 (−13.2)	9.7 (−12.4)	18.0 (−7.8)	25.7 (−3.5)	33.7 (0.9)	40.8 (4.9)	39.2 (4.0)	33.2 (0.7)	25.2 (−3.8)	18.0 (−7.8)	10.8 (−11.8)	2.1 (−16.6)
Record low °F (°C)	−13 (−25)	−9 (−23)	−13 (−25)	4 (−16)	18 (−8)	27 (−3)	33 (1)	32 (0)	26 (−3)	6 (−14)	1 (−17)	−9 (−23)	−13 (−25)
Average precipitation inches (mm)	3.38 (86)	3.17 (81)	2.98 (76)	2.70 (69)	2.64 (67)	2.74 (70)	2.51 (64)	3.71 (94)	4.50 (114)	4.93 (125)	4.99 (127)	4.42 (112)	42.67 (1,084)
Average snowfall inches (cm)	12.6 (32)	10.0 (25)	12.8 (33)	6.4 (16)	1.2 (3.0)	0.0 (0.0)	0.0 (0.0)	0.0 (0.0)	0.0 (0.0)	2.0 (5.1)	8.2 (21)	14.1 (36)	67.3 (171)
Average precipitation days (≥ 0.01 in)	20.5	20.1	19.4	18.9	17.8	17.4	19.8	21.3	22.6	24.8	24.4	23.4	250.4
Average snowy days (≥ 0.1 in)	13.0	12.7	13.3	9.1	2.4	0.0	0.0	0.0	0.1	3.1	9.7	14.2	77.6
Average relative humidity (%)	84.3	83.5	82.8	82.5	83.5	86.3	88.3	89.5	86.4	82.8	83.5	86.3	85.0
Average dew point °F (°C)	25.9 (−3.4)	24.1 (−4.4)	25.7 (−3.5)	27.3 (−2.6)	34.0 (1.1)	40.8 (4.9)	46.6 (8.1)	48.4 (9.1)	44.2 (6.8)	36.0 (2.2)	30.4 (−0.9)	30.6 (−0.8)	34.5 (1.4)
Source 1: NOAA (relative humidity and dew point 1961–1990)
Source 2: National Weather Service

See or edit raw graph data.

== Demographics ==
Historical population
Census	Pop.	Note	%±
1890	231		—
1960	86		—
1970	256		197.7%
1980	228		−10.9%
1990	148		−35.1%
2000	88		−40.5%
2010	108		22.7%
2020	50		−53.7%
U.S. Decennial Census

Cold Bay first appeared on the 1890 U.S. Census as the unincorporated area of "Thin Point", which included Thin Point & Cold Bay (including two canneries and Cold Bay Salting Station). It reported 231 residents, of which 110 were White, 106 were Asian, ten were Creole (Mixed Russian & Native), three were Native and two were Other. It would not appear again until 1960, when it reported as the unincorporated village of Cold Bay. It was made a census-designated place (CDP) in 1980 and incorporated in 1982.

Cold Bay is a highly transient community, lacking the generational attachment characteristic of the surrounding native villages. Residents, drawn to the area largely by the Wildlife Refuge, Weather Service, or air traffic jobs, rarely stay more than a year in Cold Bay.

=== 2020 census ===
As of the 2020 census, Cold Bay had a population of 50. The median age was 43.5 years. 16.0% of residents were under the age of 18 and 4.0% of residents were 65 years of age or older. For every 100 females there were 150.0 males, and for every 100 females age 18 and over there were 147.1 males age 18 and over.

0.0% of residents lived in urban areas, while 100.0% lived in rural areas.

There were 21 households in Cold Bay, of which 28.6% had children under the age of 18 living in them. Of all households, 47.6% were married-couple households, 23.8% were households with a male householder and no spouse or partner present, and 28.6% were households with a female householder and no spouse or partner present. About 14.3% of all households were made up of individuals and 14.3% had someone living alone who was 65 years of age or older.

There were 59 housing units, of which 64.4% were vacant. The homeowner vacancy rate was 0.0% and the rental vacancy rate was 0.0%.

Racial composition as of the 2020 census
Race	Number	Percent
White	16	32.0%
Black or African American	3	6.0%
American Indian and Alaska Native	13	26.0%
Asian	1	2.0%
Native Hawaiian and Other Pacific Islander	0	0.0%
Some other race	2	4.0%
Two or more races	15	30.0%
Hispanic or Latino (of any race)	6	12.0%

=== 2000 census ===
At the 2000 census, there were 88 people, 36 households and 18 families residing in the city. The population density was 1.6 per square mile (0.6/km^{2}). There were 98 housing units at an average density of 1.8 per square mile (0.7/km^{2}). The racial makeup of the city was 72% White, 3% Black or African American, 17% Native American, 5% Asian, 2% Pacific Islander, and 1% from two or more races. 2% of the population were Hispanic or Latino of any race.

There were 36 households, of which 33% had children under the age of 18 living with them, 44% were married couples living together, 3% had a female householder with no husband present, and 50% were non-families. 36% of all households were made up of individuals, and none had someone living alone who was 65 years of age or older. The average household size was two and the average family size was three.

Age distribution was 24% under the age of 18, 9% from 18 to 24, 40% from 25 to 44, 27% from 45 to 64. The median age was 34 years. For every 100 females, there were 184 males. For every 100 females age 18 and over, there were 205 males.

The median household income was $55,750, and the median family income was $64,375. Males had a median income of $36,250 versus $38,333 for females. The per capita income for the city was $20,037. There were no families and 27% of the population living below the poverty line, including no one under eighteen or over 64.

=== Religion ===
Cold Bay has a significant Baptist population. The city's only church is Cold Bay Community Chapel, a member of the Southern Baptist Convention.

== Economy ==
Cold Bay has one store, the Bearfoot Inn Alaska, formerly known as the World-famous Weathered Inn. It supplies groceries, clothing and small trinkets to the residents of Cold Bay and other communities within the Aleutians East Borough, although many residents order groceries and supplies from suppliers in Anchorage and Seattle. The Bearfoot Inn also offers lodging with its 8-room hotel and 6-room bunk house. Within the main building there is the Bearfoot Inn Bar which is open 3 to 6 days a week depending on the season. Bearfoot Inn is within walking distance of the airport.

The Cold Bay Lodge is the only restaurant in town. The lodge can accommodate up to about 40 people (38 beds), offers wireless Internet access, holds a liquor license, is less than a mile from the airport and offers trinkets and snacks.

== Culture ==
=== Traditions ===
A major community event is the Silver Salmon Derby, a fishing contest that takes place every fall. Participants vie in both adult and child categories for cash prizes for the largest fish. A raft race and "Polar Bear Jump" are also held. The Derby concludes with a banquet and door prize giveaway at the town community hall.

== Parks and recreation ==
=== Izembek National Wildlife Refuge ===
The 498,000-acre (2,020 km^{2}) Izembek refuge was established in 1960. It encompasses several large lagoons, including the 30-mile (48 km) long Izembek Lagoon, which serve as a food source and shelter for a large migratory bird population.

Approximately 150,000 Pacific black brant, 62,000 emperor geese, 50,000 Taverner's Canada geese, 300,000 ducks, and 80,000 shore birds stop over in the Izembek area during migration and as many as 50,000 Steller's eiders find winter grounds there.

== Government ==
Cold Bay was incorporated as a city in January 1982. Cold Bay is classified by the state government as a second-class city. As such, it is governed by a seven-member city council, which elects the city's mayor from among its membership. The current mayor is Harold Kremer. The city clerk is Lorie Pierce.

=== Mayors ===
The following individuals have served as the mayor of Cold Bay since its incorporation:

Tenure	Name
1982–1984	Monte M. Larsh
1984–1985	Donald Dennis
1985 - 1988	Clayton Brown
1988-1997	Gerry Dias
1997–1998	Alan Ellis
1998–1999	Jim Blowers
1999–2004	Harold (Happy) Kremer
2004–2010	John Maxwell
2010–2015	Jorge Lopez
2015–2017	Candace Schaack
2017–2019	Dailey Schaack
2020–2021	David Lyons
2021–2021	Harold (Happy) Kremer
2021-2022	Robert Nielsen
2022-2023	Candace (Schaack) Nielsen

== Education ==
=== Cold Bay School ===
The Cold Bay School was the community's public grade school, operated by the Aleutians East Borough School District (AEBSD), until its closure in May 2015. AEBSD's school board voted to close Cold Bay School following the conclusion of the 2014–2015 school year due to a decline in enrollment, which led to the loss of state funding. The school employed one teacher and served between four and nine students in its last years. The loss of the school caused an exodus of the remaining school-aged children until, by 2015, only one was left.

Circa 1978 the school, then a part of the Aleutian Region School District, had two teachers, and 37 students. In the 1980s, the school typically enrolled around 30 students. In 1985 it reached peak enrollment, with 50 students and four teachers. Despite its remote location, the school was involved in state and national activities, such as hosting the military's "Operation Arctic Care" outreach health program in 2002, and by briefly becoming involved with reporting for CNN Student Bureau that same year.

The school building was used to house passengers of flights which made emergency landings in Cold Bay.

== Infrastructure ==
=== Transportation ===
==== Road ====
Cold Bay has approximately 40 miles (64 km) of gravel roads, and a state-owned paved highway.

==== Water ====
The Alaska Marine Highway travels between Cold Bay and Kodiak twice a month between May and October, and cargo ships visit the city monthly from Seattle, Washington. Currently, the city only has a dock and a seaplane base, but the city hopes to develop a breakwater, boat harbor and boat launch.

==== Air ====
Cold Bay is serviced by Cold Bay Airport, holding the fifth-largest runway in Alaska, and a second, smaller one. Regional flights occur six times a week.
