= List of former United States Air Force installations =

This is a list of former United States Air Force installations.

Does not include United States Army Air Forces facilities closed before September 1947.

== United States ==
See: North Warning System for a list of contractor-operated Distant Early Warning Line (DEW) radar stations in Greenland (Denmark), Canada and Alaska.

See: Eastern Test Range for Air Force Auxiliary Bases established to support missile and rocket launches from Cape Canaveral Air Force Station during the 1950s and early 1960s.

Former US Air Force installations within the United States
Installation name	Location	State	End date	Fate	Ref.
Alexandria Air Force Base	Alexandria	Louisiana	1955	Redesignated as England Air Force Base	
Amarillo Air Force Base	Amarillo	Texas	1969	Closed	
Amchitka Air Force Base	Rat Islands	Alaska	1948	Closed	
Andrews Air Force Base	Camp Springs	Maryland	2009	Realigned as part of Joint Base Andrews	
Anniston Air Force Base	Talladega	Alabama	1952	Closed	
Ardmore Air Force Base	Ardmore	Oklahoma	1959	Closed	
Atterbury Air Force Base	Columbus	Indiana	1954	Redesignated as Bakalar Air Force Base	
Avon Park Air Force Base	Avon Park	Florida	1956	Redesignated as Avon Park Air Force Range	
Bainbridge Air Base	Bainbridge	Georgia	1961	Closed	
Bakalar Air Force Base	Columbus	Indiana	1970	Closed	
Barking Sands Air Force Base	Kekaha	Hawaii	1954	Redesignated as Bonham Air Force Base	
Bartow Air Base	Bartow	Florida	1961	Closed	
Bellows Air Force Base	Oahu	Hawaii	1958	Redesignated as Bellows Air Force Station	
Benjamin Harrison Air Force Base	Indianapolis	Indiana	1950	Realigned to the US Army as Fort Benjamin Harrison	
Bergstrom Air Force Base	Austin	Texas	1993	Closed	
Big Delta Air Force Base	Big Delta	Alaska	1950	Realigned to the US Army	
Big Spring Air Force Base	Big Spring	Texas	1952	Redesignated as Webb Air Force Base	
Biggs Air Force Base	El Paso	Texas	1966	Realigned to the US Army as Biggs Army Airfield in 1973	
Blytheville Air Force Base	Blytheville	Arkansas	1988	Redesignated as Eaker Air Force Base	
Bolling Air Force Base	Southeast	Washington, D.C.	2010	Realigned as part of Joint Base Anacostia–Bolling	
Bonham Air Force Base	Kekaha	Hawaii	1956	Realigned to the US Navy as the Pacific Missile Range Facility	
Brookley Air Force Base	Mobile	Alabama	1969	Closed	
Brooks Air Force Base	San Antonio	Texas	2002	Redesignated as Brooks City-Base	
Brooks City-Base	San Antonio	Texas	2011	Closed	
Bryan Air Force Base	Bryan	Texas	1958	Closed	
Buckley Air Force Base	Aurora	Colorado	2020	Realigned to the US Space Force as Buckley Space Force Base	
Bunker Hill Air Force Base	Bunker Hill	Indiana	1968	Redesignated as Grissom Air Force Base	
Camp Hood Air Force Base	Killeen	Texas		Redesignated as Gray Air Force Base	
Camp Stewart Air Force Base	Hinsville	Georgia	1953	Realigned to the US Army	
Campbell Air Force Base	Fort Campbell	Kentucky	1959	Realigned to the US Army as Campbell Army Airfield	
Cape Air Force Base	Umnak	Alaska	1950	Closed	
Cape Canaveral Air Force Station	Cocoa Beach	Florida	2020	Realigned to the US Space Force as Cape Canaveral Space Force Station	
Cape Cod Air Force Station	Sagamore	Massachusetts	2020	Realigned to the US Space Force as Cape Cod Space Force Station	
Carswell Air Force Base	Fort Worth	Texas	1993	Redesignated as Carswell Air Reserve Station	
Carswell Air Reserve Station	Fort Worth	Texas	1994	Realigned to the US Navy as Naval Air Station Joint Reserve Base Fort Worth	
Castle Air Force Base	Atwater	California	1995	Closed	
Cavalier Air Force Station	Cavalier	North Dakota	2021	Realigned to the US Space Force as Cavalier Space Force Station	
Chanute Air Force Base	Rantoul	Illinois	1993	Closed	
Charleston Air Force Base	Charleston	South Carolina	2010	Realigned as part of Joint Base Charleston	
Chatham Air Force Base	Savannah	Georgia	1950	Redesignated as Savannah Air National Guard Base	
Cheli Air Force Station	Bell	California	1961	Closed	
Chennault Air Force Base	Lake Charles	Louisiana	1963	Closed	
Cheyenne Mountain Air Force Base	Colorado Springs	Colorado	1995	Redesignated as Cheyenne Mountain Air Station	
Cheyenne Mountain Air Force Station	Colorado Springs	Colorado	2021	Realigned to the US Space Force as Cheyenne Mountain Space Force Station	
Cheyenne Mountain Air Station	Colorado Springs	Colorado	2000	Redesignated as Cheyenne Mountain Air Force Station	
Clear Air Force Station	Anderson	Alaska	2021	Realigned to the US Space Force as Clear Space Force Station	
Clinton County Air Force Base	Wilmington	Ohio	1972	Closed	
Clinton-Sherman Air Force Base	Clinton	Oklahoma	1969	Closed	
Congaree Air Force Base	Eastover	South Carolina	1961	Redesignated as McEntire Air National Guard Base	
Craig Air Force Base	Selma	Alabama	1977	Closed	
Cross City Air Force Station	Cross City	Florida	1970	Closed	
Davis Air Force Base	Adak	Alaska	1950	Realigned to the US Navy as Naval Air Facility Adak	
Dillingham Air Force Base	Oahu	Hawaii	1975	Realigned to the US Army	
Dobbins Air Force Base	Marietta	Georgia	1968	Redesignated as Dobbins Air Reserve Base	
Donaldson Air Force Base	Greenville	South Carolina	1963	Closed	
Dow Air Force Base	Bangor	Maine	1968	Redesignated as Bangor Air National Guard Base	
Eaker Air Force Base	Blytheville	Arkansas	1992	Closed	
Edward Gary Air Force Base	San Marcos	Texas	1956	Realigned to the US Army as Camp Gary	
Ellington Air Force Base	Houston	Texas	1976	Redesignated as Ellington Field Joint Reserve Base	
Ent Air Force Base	Colorado Springs	Colorado	1976	Closed	
Ethan Allen Air Force Base	Burlington	Vermont	1960	Redesignated as Burlington Air National Guard Base	
Forbes Air Force Base	Topeka	Kansas	1973	Redesignated as Forbes Field Air National Guard Base	
Foster Air Force Base	Victoria	Texas	1959	Closed	
Galena Air Force Station	Galena	Alaska	1993	Closed. Transferred to civilian use as Edward G. Pitka Sr. Airport.	
Gary Air Force Base	San Marcos	Texas	1955	Redesignated as Edward Gary Air Force Base	
George Air Force Base	Victorville	California	1992	Closed	
Glasgow Air Force Base	Glasgow	Montana	1977	Closed	
Godman Air Force Base	Louisville	Kentucky	1954	Realigned to the US Army as Godman Army Airfield	
Graham Air Base	Marianna	Florida	1961	Closed	
Gray Air Force Base	Killeen	Texas	1955	Realigned to the US Army as Robert Gray Army Airfield	
Greenville Air Force Base	Greenville	Mississippi	1966	Closed	
Grenier Air Force Base	Manchester	New Hampshire	1966	Closed	
Griffiss Air Force Base	Rome	New York	1994	Closed. Parts in use as Rome Laboratory and Eastern Air Defense Sector.	
Gunter Air Force Base	Montgomery	Alabama	1992	Redesignated as Gunter Annex, part of Maxwell Air Force Base	
Grissom Air Force Base	Bunker Hill	Indiana	1994	Redesignated as Grissom Air Reserve Base	
Hamilton Air Force Base	Novato	California	1976	Realigned to the US Army as Hamilton Army Airfield in 1983	
Harlingen Air Force Base	Harlingen	Texas	1962	Closed	
Hobbs Air Force Base	Hobbs	New Mexico	1948	Closed	
Homestead Air Force Base	Homestead	Florida	1994	Redesignated as Homestead Air Reserve Base	
Hondo Air Base	Hondo	Texas	1958	Closed	
Horsham Air National Guard Station	Horsham Township	Pennsylvania	2021	Redesignated as Biddle Air National Guard Base	
Hunter Air Force Base	Savannah	Georgia	1967	Realigned to the US Army as Hunter Army Airfield	
James Connally Air Force Base	Waco	Texas	1968	Closed	
Kearney Air Force Base	Kearney	Nebraska	1949	Closed	
Kelly Air Force Base	San Antonio	Texas	2001	Redesignated as Kelly Field Annex, part of Lackland Air Force Base	
K.I. Sawyer Air Force Base	Marquette	Michigan	1995	Closed	
Kincheloe Air Force Base	Kinross	Michigan	1977	Closed	
Kinross Air Force Base	Kinross	Michigan	1959	Redesignated as Kincheloe Air Force Base	
Kinston Air Base	Kinston	North Carolina	1952	Redesignated as Stallings Air Base	
Lackland Air Force Base	San Antonio	Texas	2010	Realigned as part of Joint Base San Antonio	
Ladd Air Force Base	Fairbanks	Alaska	1961	Realigned to the US Army as Ladd Army Airfield	
Lake Charles Air Force Base	Lake Charles	Louisiana	1947	Redesignated as Chennault Air Force Base	
Langley Air Force Base	Newport News	Virginia	2010	Realigned as part of Joint Base Langley-Eustis	
Laredo Air Force Base	Laredo	Texas	1973	Closed	
Larson Air Force Base	Moses Lake	Washington	1966	Closed	
Laurinburg-Maxton Air Force Base	Maxton	North Carolina	1956	Closed	
Lawson Air Force Base	Columbus	Georgia	1954	Realigned to the US Army as Lawson Army Airfield	
Limestone Air Force Base	Limestone	Maine	1954	Redesignated as Loring Air Force Base	
Lincoln Air Force Base	Lincoln	Nebraska	1966	Redesignated as Lincoln Air National Guard Base	
Lockbourne Air Force Base	Columbus	Ohio	1994	Redesignated as Rickenbacker Air National Guard Base	
Loring Air Force Base	Limestone	Maine	1994	Closed	
Lowry Air Force Base	Denver	Colorado	1994	Closed	
Malden Air Base	Malden	Missouri	1961	Closed	
Marana Air Base	Marana	Arizona	1961	Closed	
Marks Air Force Base	Nome	Alaska	1950	Closed	
Marshall Air Force Base	Fort Riley	Kansas	1953	Realigned to the US Army as Marshall Army Airfield	
Mather Air Force Base	Sacramento	California	1993	Closed	
McChord Air Force Base	Lakewood	Washington	2010	Realigned as part of Joint Base Lewis–McChord	
McClellan Air Force Base	Sacramento	California	2001	Part realigned to US Coast Guard as CGAS Sacramento, remainder transferred to civilian use and became Sacramento McClellan Airport and McClellan Business Park	
McCoy Air Force Base	Orlando	Florida	1975	Closed. Portion realigned to the US Navy as NTC Orlando McCoy Annex, remainder to civilian control as Orlando International Airport	
McGuire Air Force Base	Wrightstown	New Jersey	2009	Realigned as part of Joint Base McGuire–Dix–Lakehurst	
Mitchel Air Force Base	Hempstead	New York	1961	Closed	
Moore Air Base	Mission	Texas	1961	Closed	
Moses Lake Air Force Base	Moses Lake	Washington	1950	Redesignated as Larson Air Force Base	
Mount Hebo Air Force Station	Hebo	Oregon	1980	Closed	
Myrtle Beach Air Force Base	Myrtle Beach	South Carolina	1993	Closed	
Naknek Air Force Base	Naknek	Alaska	1990	Transferred to civilian use as King Salmon Airport	
New Boston Air Force Station	New Boston	New Hampshire	2021	Realigned to the US Space Force as New Boston Space Force Station	
Newark Air Force Base	Heath	Ohio	1996	Closed	
Newcastle Air Force Base	Wilmington	Delaware	1958	Redesignated as New Castle Air National Guard Base	
Norton Air Force Base	San Bernardino	California	1994	Closed	
Olmsted Air Force Base	Harrisburg	Pennsylvania	1969	Redesignated as Harrisburg Air National Guard Base	
Onizuka Air Force Station	Sunnyvale	California	2010	Closed	
Orlando Air Force Base	Orlando	Florida	1968	Realigned to the US Navy as Naval Training Center Orlando	
Oscoda Air Force Base	Oscoda Township	Michigan	1953	Redesignated as Wurtsmith Air Force Base	
Otis Air Force Base	Mashpee	Massachusetts	1977	Partially Redesignated as Otis Air National Guard Base	
Oxnard Air Force Base	Camarillo	California	1970	Closed	
Paine Air Force Base	Everett	Washington	1972	Redesignated as Paine Air National Guard Base	
Palm Beach Air Force Base	West Palm Beach	Florida	1962	Closed	
Parks Air Force Base	Pleasanton	California	1959	Realigned to as the US Army	
Patrick Air Force Base	Cocoa Beach	Florida	2020	Realigned to the US Space Force as Patrick Space Force Base	
Pease Air Force Base	Portsmouth	New Hampshire	1991	Redesignated as Pease Air National Guard Base	
Peterson Air Force Base	Colorado Springs	Colorado	2021	Realigned to the US Space Force as Peterson Space Force Base	
Perrin Air Force Base	Sherman	Texas	1971	Closed	
Pinecastle Air Force Base	Orlando	Florida	1958	Redesignated as McCoy Air Force Base	
Plattsburgh Air Force Base	Plattsburgh	New York	1995	Closed	
Pocatello Air Force Base	Pocatello	Idaho	1948	Closed	
Point Spencer Air Force Base	Seward	Alaska	1948	Closed	
Pope Air Force Base	Fayetteville	North Carolina	2011	Realigned to the US Army as Pope Field	
Portsmouth Air Force Base	Portsmouth	New Hampshire	1957	Redesignated as Pease Air Force Base	
Presque Isle Air Force Base	Presque Isle	Maine	1961	Closed	
Pyote Air Force Base	Pyote	Texas	1954	Closed. Re-opened in 1958 as Pyote Air Force Station, an air defense radar station	
Randolph Air Force Base	San Antonio	Texas	2010	Realigned as part of Joint Base San Antonio	
Reese Air Force Base	Lubbock	Texas	1997	Closed	
Richards-Gebaur Air Force Base	Kansas City	Missouri	1994	Closed	
Sampson Air Force Base	Geneva	New York	1956	Realigned to the US Army as Sampson Army Airfield	
San Bernardino Air Force Base	San Bernardino	California	1948	Redesignated as Norton Air Force Base	
San Marcos Air Force Base	San Marcos	Texas	1953	Redesignated as Gary Air Force Base	
Schilling Air Force Base	Salina	Kansas	1965	Closed	
Schriever Air Force Base	Colorado Springs	Colorado	2021	Realigned to the US Space Force as Schriever Space Force Base	
Selfridge Air Force Base	Detroit	Michigan	1971	Redesignated as Selfridge Air National Guard Base	
Sewart Air Force Base	Smyrna	Tennessee	1970	Closed	
Shemya Air Force Base	Shemya Island	Alaska	1994	Redesignated as Eareckson Air Station	
Sherman Air Force Base	Leavenworth	Kansas	1953	Realigned to the US Army as Sherman Army Airfield	
Slocum Air Force Base	Davids Island	New York	1950	Realigned to the US Army as Fort Slocum	
Smoky Hill Air Force Base	Salina	Kansas		Redesignated as Schilling Air Force Base	
Smyrna Air Force Base	Smyrna	Tennessee	1950	Redesignated as Sewart Air Force Base	
Stallings Air Base	Kinston	North Carolina	1957	Closed	
Standiford Air Force Base	Louisville	Kentucky	1951	Redesignated as Louisville Air National Guard Base	
Stewart Air Force Base	Newburgh	New York	1970	Redesignated as Stewart Air National Guard Base	
Stead Air Force Base	Reno	Nevada	1966	Closed	
Suffolk County Air Force Base	Westhampton Beach	New York	1969	Redesignated as Francis S. Gabreski Air National Guard Base in 1970.	
Sunnyvale Air Force Station	Sunnyvale	California	1994	Redesignated as Onizuka Air Force Station	
Thornbrough Air Force Base	Cold Bay	Alaska	1953	Closed	
Tonopah Air Force Base	Tonopah	Nevada	1948	Closed	
Topeka Air Force Base	Topeka	Kansas		Redesignated as Forbes Air Force Base	
Turner Air Force Base	Albany	Georgia	1966	Realigned to the US Navy as Naval Air Station Albany	
Vandenberg Air Force Base	Lompoc	California	2021	Realigned to the US Space Force as Vandenberg Space Force Base	
Vincent Air Force Base	Yuma	Arizona	1959	Realigned to the United States Marine Corps as Marine Corps Air Station Yuma	
Waco Air Force Base	Waco	Texas	1966	Redesignated as James Connally Air Force Base	
Walker Air Force Base	Roswell	New Mexico	1967	Closed	
Walseth Air Force Base	Seward	Alaska	1947	Closed	
Webb Air Force Base	Big Spring	Texas	1978	Closed	
Wendover Air Force Base	Wendover	Utah	1958	Closed	
Westover Air Force Base	Chicopee	Massachusetts	1991	Redesignated as Westover Air Reserve Base	
Wheeler Air Force Base	Oahu	Hawaii	1993	Realigned to the US Army as Wheeler Army Airfield	
Williams Air Force Base	Chandler	Arizona	1993	Closed	
Wolters Air Force Base	Mineral Wells	Texas	1948	Realigned to the US Army as Fort Wolters	
Wurtsmith Air Force Base	Oscoda Township	Michigan	1993	Closed	

== Central America and Caribbean ==
=== Panama ===
- Albrook Air Force Base, Canal Zone, (Closed 1997)
- France Air Force Base, Canal Zone, (Closed 1949)
- Howard Air Force Base, Canal Zone, (Closed 1999)

=== Puerto Rico ===
- Ramey Air Force Base, Aguadilla, Puerto Rico (Closed 1971)

Portion transferred to United States Coast Guard
Renamed CGAS Borinquen (Active)

== Europe/Mediterranean/North Atlantic ==
Includes bases in North Africa and the United Kingdom used by Strategic Air Command and bases used by the United States Air Forces in Europe (after 1947). Non-flying minor Air Stations not included.

=== Belgium/The Netherlands ===
- Florennes Air Base, Belgium

Used as BGM-109G Ground Launched Cruise Missile base, 1984–1989

- Soesterberg Air Base, Netherlands (Closed 1994)
- Woensdrecht Air Base, Netherlands

Planned BGM-109G Ground Launched Cruise Missile base (Closed 1988, never made active)

=== Eastern Europe ===
Air Bases in Bulgaria and Romania negotiated by diplomatic agreements for USAF use not included

- Mostar Airport, Bosnia and Herzegovina (Closed 1997)
- Taszár Air Base, Hungary (Closed 2010)
- Tuzla Air Base, Bosnia and Herzegovina (Closed 2008)

=== France ===
- Bordeaux-Mérignac Air Base (Closed 1958)
- Chambley-Bussières Air Base (Closed 1967)
- Châteauroux-Déols Air Base (Closed 1967)
- Chaumont-Semoutiers Air Base

Active USAFE use ended 1963, Reserve status until 1967

- Dreux-Louvilliers Air Base

Active USAFE use ended 1962, Reserve status until 1966

- Étain-Rouvres Air Base

Active USAFE use ended 1963, Reserve status until 1967

- Évreux-Fauville Air Base

Active USAFE use ended 1964, Reserve status until 1967

- Laon-Couvron Air Base (Closed 1967)
- Paris-Orly Air Base (Closed 1967)
- Phalsbourg-Bourscheid Air Base

Active USAFE use ended 1963, Reserve status until 1967

- Toul-Rosières Air Base (Closed 1967)

=== Austria/Germany ===
Includes Occupied Austria (1945–1955), Occupied Germany (1947–1949); West Germany (1949–1990), and Occupied Berlin (West Berlin) (1947–1990)

- 652nd USAF Contingency Hospital, Donaueschingen (Closed early 1990s, redeveloped into apartments)
- Bitburg Air Base (Closed 1994)
- Erding Air Base

Turned over to West German Air Force, 1960
Remained in occasional use by USAFE until 1989

- Fürstenfeldbruck Air Base

Turned over to West German Air Force, 1957

- Giebelstadt Air Base

Turned over to United States Army, 1968

- Hahn Air Base (Closed 1994)
- Landsberg Air Base

Turned over to West German Air Force, 1957

- Kaufbeuren Air Base

Turned over to West German Air Force, 1957

- Munich-Riem Airport, returned to civil use, 1948
- Neubiberg Air Base

Turned over to West German Air Force, 1957

- Frankfurt Airport, returned to civil use 1955

USAF Rhein-Main Air Base (Closed 2005)

- Tempelhof Central Airport, Berlin, returned to civil use, 1994
- Tulln Air Base, Vienna, Austria

Transferred to Austrian Police, 1955

- Wiesbaden Air Base

Transferred to United States Army, 1976
USAF facility (Lindsey Air Station), Closed 1993

- Wüschheim Air Station (Closed 1990)

Known as "Site VI" for MGM-1 Matador/MGM-13 Mace tactical missiles 1958–1966
Used as BGM-109G Ground Launched Cruise Missile base, 1985–1990

- Zweibrücken Air Base (Closed 1994)

=== Iceland ===
- Naval Air Station Keflavik, Iceland (Closed 2006)

=== Denmark (Greenland) ===
- Narsarsuaq Air Base, Greenland (Closed 1958)
- Sondrestrom Air Base, Greenland, (Closed 1992)
- Thule Air Base, Greenland, (Open 1943)

=== Mediterranean ===
- Ben Guerir Air Base, Morocco (Closed 1958)
- Boulhaut Air Base, Morocco (Closed 1963)
- Comiso Air Base, Italy

Used as BGM-109G Ground Launched Cruise Missile base, 1983–1991

- Hellenikon Airport, Greece (Closed 1993)
- Iraklion Air Station, Crete, Greece (Closed 1993)
- Nouasseur Air Base, Morocco (Closed 1963)
- Pirinclik Air Base, Turkey (Closed 1997)
- Torrejón Air Base, Spain (Closed 1994)
- Sidi Slimane Air Base, Morocco (Closed 1963)
- Wheelus Air Base, Libya (Closed 1970)
- Zaragoza Air Base, Spain (Closed 1994)

=== Newfoundland ===
- Border Beacon
- Cape Makkovik Air Station
- Cape Spear Radar Station
- Cartwright Air Station
- Cut Throat Island Air Station
- Elliston Ridge Air Station
- Ernest Harmon AFB, Newfoundland (Closed 1966)

(now Stephenville International Airport)

- Fox Harbour Air Station
- Goose AB, Labrador (Closed 1973)

Transferred to Canadian Forces, now CFB Goose Bay
Last USAF units inactivated 1976

- Hopedale Air Station
- La Scie Air Station
- McAndrew AFB, Argentia, Newfoundland

Transferred to United States Navy, 1955
Renamed NAS Argentia, then Naval Station Argentia (Closed 1994)

- Melville Air Station
- Pepperell AFB, St. John's, Newfoundland (closed 1961)

Transferred to Canadian Forces, now CFS St. John's

- Red Cliff Air Station
- Saglek Air Station

Transferred to Canadian Forces, now CFS Saglek

- Saint Anthony Air Station
- Spotted Island Air Station
- Stephenville Air Station

=== United Kingdom ===
- RAF Alconbury (Active)
- RAF Bassingbourn (SAC deployments ended 1950)
- RAF Bentwaters (Closed by USAFE 1992)
- RAF Bovingdon (closed by SAC – 1960)
- RAF Brize Norton (SAC deployments ended 1966)
- RAF Bruntingthorpe (SAC deployments ended 1966)
- RAF Burtonwood

SAC/USAFE operational use ended 1966
Transferred to United States Army

- RAF Chelveston

SAC deployments ended 1966
Active USAFE use ended 1970. Airfield removed in 1977. Remained as reserve storage and family housing base until 1992 as a satellite of RAF Alconbury.

- RAF Chicksands

Used by USAF Security Service until 1997

- RAF Croughton

Major USAF communications base

- RAF Daws Hill (Closed 1969)
- RAF East Kirkby (closed by SAC – 1958)
- RAF Greenham Common

SAC deployments ended 1966, placed in reserve status by USAFE
Used as BGM-109G Ground Launched Cruise Missile base, 1982–1991

- RAF Homewood Park (Hospital), (Closed by SAC 1957)
- RAF High Wycombe, (Closed by SAC 1965, Operated by USAFE til1 1992 and currently US Navy)
- RAF Lakenheath (Active)
- RAF Little Rissington (Closed by USAFE 1993)
- RAF Lindholme (Attached to RAF Brize Norton – closed by SAC – 1962)
- RAF Manston (Closed by USAFE 1961)
- RAF Marham (SAC deployments ended 1966)
- RAF Membury, (Closed by SAC 1954)
- RAF Mildenhall, (Current)
- RAF Molesworth

Active USAFE use ended 1957, placed in reserve status
Used as BGM-109G Ground Launched Cruise Missile base, 1986–1989
Now auxiliary of RAF Alconbury, used by NATO Joint Analysis Centre

- RAF Scampton (SAC deployments ended 1966)
- RAF Sculthorpe

Active use by USAFE ended 1962, remained as reserve base until 1992

- RAF Shepherds Grove, (Closed by USAFE 1958)
- RAF Stanstead-Monfitchet, (Closed by SAC 1955)
- RAF St Eval (SAC deployments ended 1966)
- RAF Sturgate, (Closed by SAC 1955)
- RAF South Ruislip (HQ, 3rd AF till moving to RAF Mildenhall 1972 / closed by USAFE)
- RAF Upper Heyford (closed by USAFE 1994)
- RAF Waddington (SAC deployments ended 1966)
- RAF West Drayton (closed by SAC – 1962)
- RAF West Ruislip (closed by USAFE 1975 – operated by US Navy till 2008)
- RAF Wethersfield

Active USAFE use ended 1970, remained as reserve base until 1992

- RAF Woodbridge (Closed by USAFE 1992)

== Lend-Lease bases ==
Caribbean Lend-Lease bases inactivated in 1949, however 99-year lease signed in 1940 remains in effect, United States has right of return until 2039.

- Atkinson AFB, British Guiana (Closed 1949)
- Beane AFB, St. Lucia (Closed 1949)
- Carlsen AFB Trinidad (Closed 1949)
- Coolidge AFB, Antigua (Closed 1949)
- Kindley AFB, Bermuda

Transferred to United States Navy, 1970
Renamed NAS Bermuda (Closed 1995)

- Vernam AFB, Jamaica (Closed 1949)
- Waller AFB, Trinidad (Closed 1949)

== Southwest and Central Asia ==
Only bases publicly disclosed by United States Air Forces Central listed. Current status is undetermined unless noted.

=== Arabian Peninsula ===
- Jordan
  - H-4 Air Base, Jordan (Closed 2003)
  - Shaheed Mwaffaq Air Base, Jordan (Closed 1991)
- Kuwait
  - Ahmad al-Jaber Air Base, Kuwait (Closed 2003, Re-established 2014)
- Saudi Arabia
  - King Abdul Aziz Air Base, Dhahran, Saudi Arabia (Closed 2003)
  - King Khalid Air Base, Khamis Mushait, Saudi Arabia (Closed 2003)
  - King Faisal Naval Base, Tabuk, Saudi Arabia (Closed 2003)
  - King Fahd International Airport, Dammam, Saudi Arabia (Closed 1991)
  - Prince Sultan Air Base, Al Kharj, Saudi Arabia (Closed 2003)
  - Riyadh Air Base, Saudi Arabia (Closed 2003)
  - Taif Air Base, Saudi Arabia (Closed 2003)
- Oman
  - Masirah Air Base, Masirah Island, Oman (Inactive)
  - Seeb International Airport, Muscat, Oman (Closed 2002)
- Qatar
  - Doha International Airport, Qatar (Closed 1991)
- United Arab Emirates
  - Al Ain International Airport, Al Ain, United Arab Emirates (Closed 1991)
  - Al Banteen Air Base, Abu Dhabi, United Arab Emirates (Closed 1991)
  - Al Minhad Air Base, Dubai, United Arab Emirates (Closed 1991)
  - Sharjah International Airport, Sharjah, United Arab Emirates (Closed 1991)

=== Central Asia ===
- Bamyan Airfield (Bamian), Afghanistan
- Fayzabad Airport, Afghanistan
- Herat Airfield**, Afghanistan
- Jalalabad Airfield**

Now: Jalalabad Airport, Afghanistan

- Karshi-Khanabad Air Base**, Uzbekistan (Closed 2005)
- Khowst Airfield, Afghanistan

Other names: Chapman Airfield

- Konduz Airfield**, Afghanistan
- Mazar-e Sharif Airfield**, Afghanistan
- Maimana Airfield (Meymanh), Afghanistan
- Sheberghan Airfield, Afghanistan
- Taloqan Airfield

Now: Taloqan Airport, Afghanistan

- Transit Center at Manas, Kyrgyzstan (Closed 2014)

Note: Former Soviet Air Forces bases **

=== Iraq ===
- Al-Asad Air Base (Qadisiyah AB)

US Military Designations: FOB/Camp Al-Asad; FOB/Objective Webster
United States Marine Corps Airfield (Closed 2010)

- Al-Bakr Air Base

Joint Base Balad
332d Air Expeditionary Wing Supported United States Forces-Iraq transition from combat to stability operations, and help strengthen the capabilities of a sovereign, secure and self-reliant Iraq.
Closed December 2011.

- Al-Iskandariyah New Air Base

US Military Designations: Camp/FLB Dogwood; FOB Chosin
United States Marine Corps Camp (Closed 2008)

- Al-Sahara Air Base

US Military Designations: Camp/FOB Speicher; Camp/FLB Sycamore
Active United States Army Contingency Operating Base

- Al-Taji Army Airfield (Al Taji Camp)

US Military Designations: Camp Cooke; Camp Taji; FOB Gunner
United States Army Forward Operating Base, turned over to Iraqi Army 2010

- Al-Taqaddum Air Base

US Military Designations: FOB Guardian City, FOB Ridgeway, QBJ Redskins
United States Army Forward Operating Base, Current status undetermined

- Baghdad International Airport

Airport returned to Iraqi Civil Control 2004; full operations resumed 2008/2009
Sather Air Base Victory Base Complex
321st Air Expeditionary Wing
407th Air Expeditionary Group Trained, advised, and assisted the Iraqi Air Force to develop as a professional and credible regional airpower.
Closed December 2011.

- Baquba Air Base

US Military Designations: Camp Boom; Camp/FOB Gabe; Camp Freedom; Camp/FOB Warhorse; FOB Scunion; FOB Comanche
United States Army Forward Operating Base, Current status undetermined

- H-3 Air Base

Former Iraqi Air Force hardened "Super Base"
Consisted of H-3 Main; H-3 NW; H-3 SW and H-3 Highway (Abandoned 2003)
Camp Korean Village/Camp "KV" (USMC)

- Habbaniyah Air Base

Former RAF Habbaniya (1936–1959)
US Military Designation: Camp/FOB Manhattan
Active United States Army Forward Operating Base

- Irbil Air Base (Closed 1991)

Now: Arbil International Airport

- Jalibah Southeast Air Base (Abandoned 1991)

US Military Designations: Camp/LSA Viper
United States Marine Corps Camp, 2003

- K-1 Air Base

US Military Designations: COB K-1
United States Army Contingency Operating Base, turned over to Iraqi Army 2011

- K-2 Air Base (Bayji AB)

Former Iraqi Air Force hardened "Super Base"
US Military Designation: Camp Lancer
United States Marine Corps Camp, Current status undetermined

- Karbale Northeast Air Base (Closed 1991)

Now: Karbala Northeast Airport (Under development)

- Kirkuk Air Base (also known as Kirkuk Regional Air Base)

US Military Designations: Camp Renegade; Camp/FOB Warrior
Active United States Army Contingency Operating Base
US Military Designations: Camp Chesty (USMC); Camp/FOB Delta (USA)

- Mosul Air Base (Al-Gayyar AB, Mawsil AB)

Former Iraqi Air Force hardened "Super Base"
US Military Designations: Camp Diamondback; Camp Claiborne; Camp Marez (USA), USAF use 2003–2007
Now: Mosul International Airport (Under civil control, 2007, US use undetermined)

- Kut Al Hayy Air Base

US Military Designation: Camp Chesty
United States Marine Corps Camp (Closed 2008)

- Muthenna Air Base

Former Iraqi Air Force hardened "Super Base"
US Military Designations: FOB Headhunter; Camp Independence
Active United States Army training facility for Iraqi police and soldiers.

- Najaf Airbase (Closed 2008)

Now: Al Najaf International Airport (2008)

- Qalat Sikar Air Base

Former Iraqi Air Force hardened "Super Base"
US Military Designations: Camp Basilone; Camp Fenway;
United States Marine Corps Camp (Closed 2008)

- Qayyarah Airfield West (Saddam AB)

Former Iraqi Air Force hardened "Super Base"
US Military Designations: FOB Endurance; FOB Q-West
Active United States Army facility

- Rasheed Air Base (Al-Rashid Military Camp)

US Military Designations: Camp/FOB Falson; Camp Loyalty; Camp Al-Saqr; Camp Muleskinner; Camp Cuervo; Camp Rustamiyah; Camp Redcatcher/Redcatcher Field; Engineer Base Anvil
Active United States Army facility

- Sahl Sinjar Air Base (Abandoned 1991)

US Military Designations: Camp Sinjar
United States Army facility closed 2004, now abandoned.

- Samarra East Air Base (Al Bakr Airfield)

Former Iraqi Air Force hardened "Super Base"
US Military Designations: FOB McKenzie, FOB Pacesetter
Active United States Army facility

- Shaykh Mazhar Air Base (Abandoned 2003)

Former Iraqi Air Force hardened "Super Base"
Location of Salman Pak facility biological and chemical weapons site.

- Tal Ashtah Air Base

US Military Designation: FOB Grant, LSA Adder
United States Army facility closed 2004, now abandoned.

- Tall Afar Air Base

US Military Designation: FOB Tall Afar
Active United States Army facility

- Tallil Air Base

Former Iraqi Air Force hardened "Super Base"
US Military Designation: Camp Adder
Active United States Army facility

- Tikrit South Air Base

US Military Designation: FOB Remagen
Active United States Army facility, closed 2011

- Tuz Khurmatu Air Base

US Military Designation: FOB Bernstein
United States Army Contingency Operating Base, turned over to Iraqi Army 2006

Seized Iraqi air bases not used by the United States:

- Al Fathah Air Base (Abandoned 2003)

Former Iraqi Air Force hardened "Super Base"

- Al Muhammadi Air Base (Abandoned 2003)
- Amarah Air Base (Abandoned 1991)
- Ar Rumaylah Southwest Air Base (Abandoned 1991)
- H-1 Air Base

Former Iraqi Air Force hardened "Super Base" (Abandoned 2003)

- H-2 Air Base

Former Iraqi Air Force hardened "Super Base" (Abandoned 2003)

- Khan Bani Sad Air Base (Closed 1991)
- Ruwayshid Air Base (Abandoned 2003)
- Shaibah Air Base (Shaibah Airport)

Under Iraqi civil control, 2006, civil general aviation airport.

- Safwan Air Base

Site of 1991 Operation Desert Storm Ceasefire (Abandoned 1991)

- Salum Air Base (Abandoned 1991)
- Tikrit East Air Base (Abandoned 2003)
- Ubaydah Bin Al Jarrah Air Base

Former Iraqi Air Force hardened "Super Base"
Airfield intact, support base abandoned 2003

Note: Former Iraqi Air Force "Super Base" designation was given to airfields with numerous above-ground hardened aircraft-shelters and underground facilities that could shelter between four and ten aircraft on average. During Operation Iraqi Freedom in 2003, the Iraqi Air Force essentially stood down except in a few cases of self-defence against US and British air strikes. Despite their size – or exactly because of it – most of these airfields were barely defended in 2003 and with a few exceptions, the "Super Base" facilities were captured intact with very little damage.

Most Iraqi Air Force aircraft in various conditions from being flyable to abandoned hulks (a large number were buried) were seized by the United States and its coalition partners, however it is known that Syrian and Iranian agents were busy removing radars and items from the avionics bays and cockpits. By autumn 2004 only some 20–25 unserviceable wrecks of Iraqi aircraft and helicopters were left scattered around the many Iraqi airfields. The destruction of the Iraqi Air Force was probably one of the most complete such actions in the history of military aviation.

Although most of the former "Super Bases" have been de-militarized and today are abandoned facilities being reclaimed by the desert, a few were refurbished and were subsequently used by Army, Air Force and Marine units. They may form the organization of a new Iraqi Air Force equipped with surplus United States F-16, C-130 and other light aircraft.

== Western Pacific ==
See Far East Air Force Korean airfields (K-sites) for airfields established in the Korean Peninsula during the Korean War (1950–1953)
See Southeast Asia section for USAF bases used during the Vietnam War (1960–1976)

- Ashiya Air Base, Japan (Closed 1960)
- Chitose Air Base, Japan (Closed 1957)
- CheongJu Air Base, Republic of Korea (Closed 1980)
- Clark Air Base, Philippines (Closed 1991)
- Fuchu Air Base, Japan (Closed 1957)
- Busan West Air Base, Republic of Korea (Closed 1975)
- Harmon Air Force Base, Guam (Closed 1949)
- Itazuke Air Base, Japan (Closed 1972)
- Johnson Air Base, Japan (Closed 1973)
- Johnston Island Air Force Base, Johnston Atoll, US Minor Outlying Islands (Closed 1980, reopened 1999, Closed 2005)
- Gimhae Air Base, Republic of Korea (Closed 1980)
- Komaki Air Base, Japan (Closed 1958)
- Kume Air Station, Japan (Closed 1973)
- GwangJu Air Base*, Republic of Korea (Closed 1992)
- Miho Air Base, Japan (Closed 1957)
- Miyako Air Station (Closed 1973)
- Naha Air Base, Occupied Okinawa (Closed 1971)
- Central Field, Occupied Iwo Jima (Closed 1968)
- Northwest Guam Air Force Base, Guam (Closed 1949)
- South Field, Occupied Iwo Jima (Closed 1955)
- Northwest Guam Air Force Base, Guam (Closed 1949)
- Okino Erabu Air Station
- Sacheon Air Base, Republic of Korea (Closed 1977)
- Suwon Air Base *, Republic of Korea (Closed 1992)
- Tachikawa Air Base, Japan (Closed 1977)
- DaeGu Air Base *, Republic of Korea (Closed 1992)
- Tsuiki Air Base, Japan (Closed 1957)
- Wake Island Airfield, Wake Island, US Minor Outlying Islands (Transferred to US Army, 1993)
- Wakkanai Air Station, Hokkaido, Japan (Closed 1972)
- Yecheon Air Base, Republic of Korea (Closed 1975)
- Yozadake Air Station, Japan (Closed 1973)

* In 1992 the US government changed the status of three US air bases in South Korea. Kwang Ju Air Base, Suwon Air Base and Taegu Air Base had previously been announced as ending operations, but would instead operate at reduced levels. 15 USAF personnel were assigned to each base, and reside in former officer quarters, which was basically a small apartment. USAF aircraft transit each base, with the personnel providing transient support and maintain USAF equipment stored at each base in case of an emergency for reactivation in which ACC and other units would deploy to them. In addition, the ROK use the airfields as an air base and civil airport.

== Taiwan ==
- Chiayi Air Base, Taiwan (US departed ?)
- Ching Chuan Kang Air Base, Taiwan (US departed 1979)
- Lo Shan Radar Site, Taiwan (US departed ?)
- Makung Island, Taiwan (US departed ?)
- O Laun Pi, Taiwan (US departed ?)
- Shihmen Air Station, Taiwan (US departed ?)
- Shu Linkou Air Station, Taiwan (US departed ?)
- Sung Shan Air Base, Taiwan (US departed ?)
- Tainan Air Base, Taiwan (US departed ?)
- Taipei Air Station, Taiwan (US departed ?)
- Takangshan, Taiwan (US departed ?)
- Taoyuan Air Base, Taiwan (US departed ?)
- Hsinchu Air Base, Taiwan (US departed ?)

Note: As part of a mutual defense pact, the Republic of China (Taiwan) permitted United States forces, to utilize many ROC bases between 1957 and 1979. Deployments ended in 1979 as part of the drawdown of United States military forces in Asia after the end of the Vietnam War and the United States' transfer of diplomatic relations from the Republic of China (Taiwan) to the People's Republic of China in 1979. For more information, see United States Taiwan Defense Command and 327th Air Division.

== Southeast Asia ==
- Bien Hoa Air Base, Republic of Vietnam (Closed 1973)
- Binh Thuy Air Base, Republic of Vietnam (Closed 1971)
- Cam Ranh Air Base, Republic of Vietnam (Closed 1972)
- Da Nang Air Base, Republic of Vietnam (Closed 1973)
- Don Muang Royal Thai Air Force Base, Thailand, (Closed 1970)
- Korat Royal Thai Air Force Base, Thailand, (Closed 1975)
- Nakhon Phanom Royal Thai Navy Base, Thailand, (Closed 1976)
- Nha Trang Air Base, Republic of Vietnam (Closed 1971)
- Phu Cat Air Base, Republic of Vietnam (Closed 1971)
- Pleiku Air Base, Republic of Vietnam (Closed 1971)
- Phan Rang Air Base, Republic of Vietnam (Closed 1972)
- Takhli Royal Thai Air Force Base, Thailand, (Closed 1971, Reopened 1972–1974)
- Tan Son Nhut Air Base, Republic of Vietnam (Closed 1973)
- Tuy Hoa Air Base, Republic of Vietnam (Closed 1970)
- U-Tapao Royal Thai Navy Airfield, Thailand, (Closed 1976)**
- Ubon Royal Thai Air Force Base, Thailand, (Closed 1974)
- Udorn Royal Thai Air Force Base, Thailand, (Closed 1976)

** Note: Although active USAF use at U-Tapao ended in 1976, USAF and other DoD personnel have been temporarily deployed to the base for contingency operations in South Asia in the years since. Also U-Tapao supports various Foreign Military Sales in South Asia and DoD military personnel assigned to United States diplomatic postings in the region.

== See also ==
- Lists of military installations
- List of Royal Air Force stations
- List of Soviet Air Force bases
