= Air Training Command =

Former U.S. Air Force training command

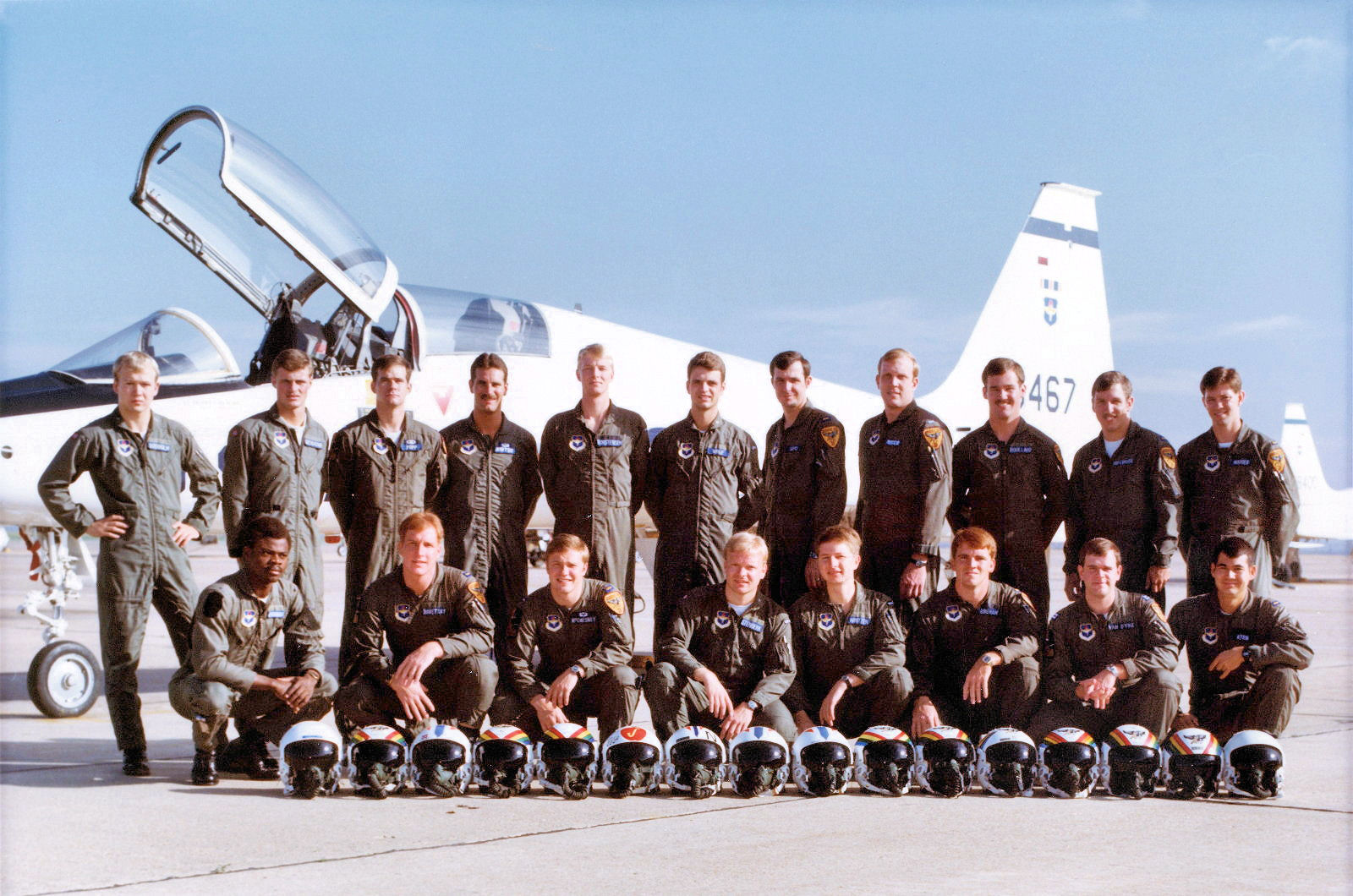
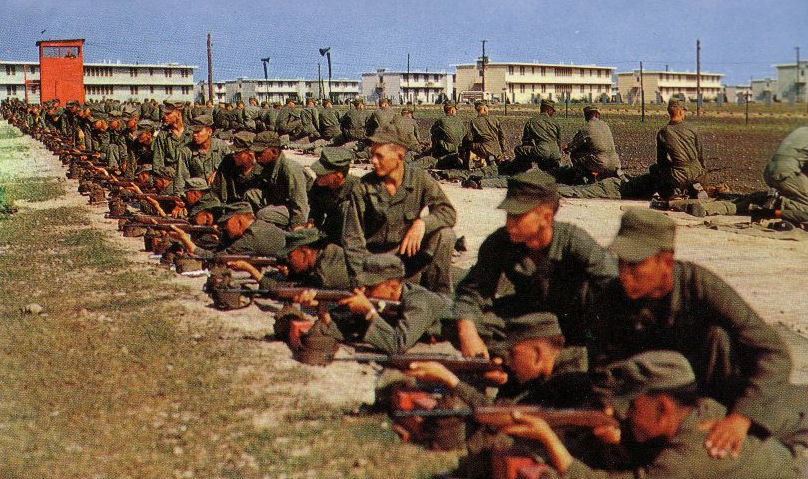
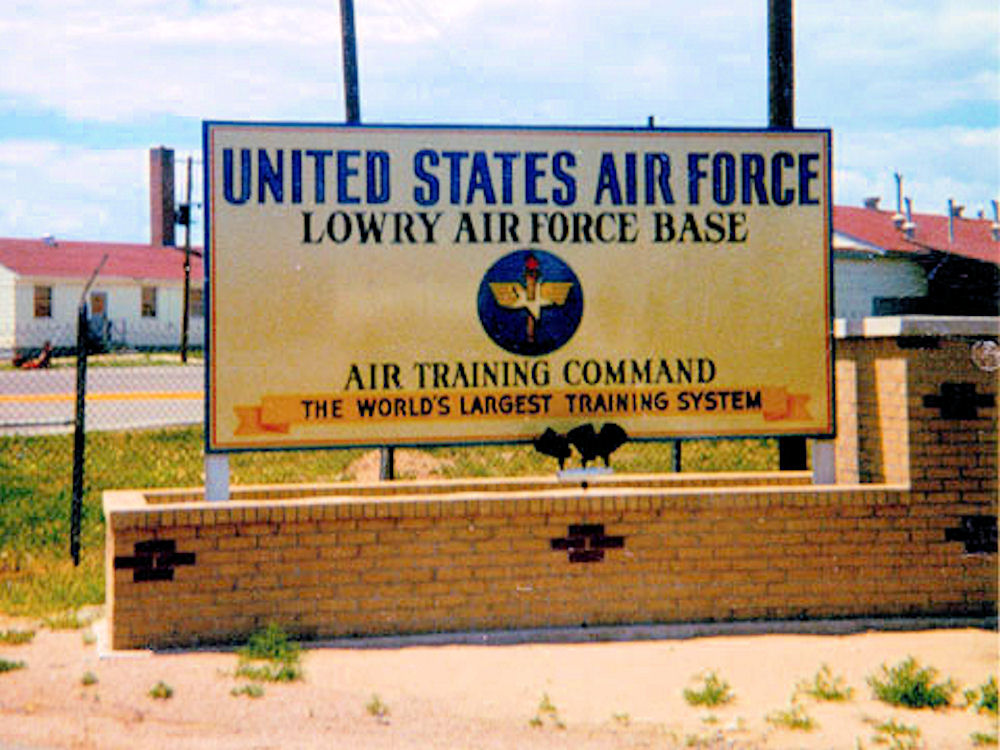
- Undergraduate Pilot Training Class photo, Class 81-05, Reese AFB, Texas, c. 1981 Vietnam War Basic Training on the M-1 carbine Dry Fire range, Lackland AFB, Texas, 1960s Entrance sign to Lowry AFB Technical Training Center, Colorado, about 1957
- Active: 1946–1993
- Country: United States
- Branch: United States Army Air Forces; United States Air Force
- Type: Major Command
- Role: Air Force Basic, Flight and Technical training
- Garrison/HQ: Randolph Air Force Base, Texas
- Nickname: ATC
- Motto: Prepare the Man
- Decorations: Air Force Organizational Excellence Award (9x)

Insignia
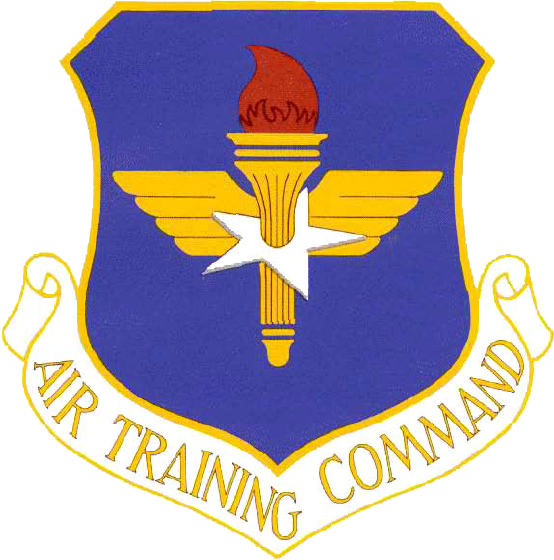
- Emblem of Air Training Command

The Air Training Command (ATC) is a former United States Air Force (USAF) Major Command designation. It was headquartered at Randolph Air Force Base, Texas, but was initially formed at Barksdale Air Force Base, Louisiana. It was re-designated as Air Education and Training Command (AETC) following a merger with Air University (AU) on 1 July 1993.

ATC was organized on 1 July 1946 as a re-designation of Army Air Forces Training Command (AAFTC) as part of the re-organization of the United States Army Air Forces (USAAF) after World War II.

For nearly 50 years, ATC was the primary training organization of the United States Air Force from its inception as an independent service in September 1947. It provided pilot and aircrew training; technical training, and enlisted and officer basic training.

At the end of the Cold War, it was merged with AU in July 1993 as part of a major top-to-bottom reorganization of the USAF. Personnel, equipment and resources of both organizations were re-designated as AETC, which assumed the mission of both organizations, but retained AU as a subordinate organization within AETC.

== History ==
=== Postwar era ===
==== Formation ====
On 1 July 1946, Army Air Forces Training Command was re-designated as Air Training Command (ATC). Since the end of World War II in September 1945, AAF Training Command had been undergoing rapid contraction, actually begun earlier in 1945 as planners understood the changing forces of the war against Nazi Germany, which ended in May 1945. Excess training bases across the United States had begun to be shut down and units consolidated during the summer of 1945 as the training needs of the USAAF was being refocused to support the requirements of those USAAF combat units in the war against Imperial Japan. The atomic bombings of Hiroshima and Nagasaki in August 1945 and the end of the war in the Pacific in September 1945 began a rapid demobilization of the U.S. armed forces. Large numbers of temporary training bases were closed and units were discontinued in late 1945 and early 1946 as the US military transitioned from a wartime footing to a peacetime one.

For that reason, ATC was organized in the summer of 1946 to become the main training organization of the postwar USAAF. One of the major organizational changes of the postwar USAAF was the elimination of the "command" organizational echelon. While most wartime Commands became "Air Divisions" in the postwar USAAF table of organization, the USAAF Training Command was elevated to the major air command echelon along with the new Tactical Air Command (TAC), Strategic Air Command (SAC) and Air Defense Command (ADC).

==== Organization ====
ATC was organized around the AAFTC's Flying Training Command and Technical Training Commands, which were redesignated as the ATC Flying and Technical Training Divisions on 1 November 1946. A third Division was formed with the creation of the ATC Indoctrination Division, which was organized around the Military Training Center in San Antonio, Texas (which had earlier been a part of Technical Training Command). All three Divisions of ATC were co-equal in status.

In June 1946, the USAAF discontinued the World War II Flying Training Wings allocated to AAFTC and each training installation was commanded by its designated Army Air Forces Base Unit (AAFBU). In September 1947, upon establishment of the United States Air Force (USAF) as an independent service, the AAFBUs on the permanent Army Air Forces bases became Air Force Base Units (AFBU) upon the bases' transfer to the USAF. By mid-1948, with the adoption by the USAF of the Hobson Plan Wing-Base organization (as opposed to the AFBU Base organization), the AFBUs were discontinued or redesignated in favor of new USAF four-digit "table of distribution units" established by USAF or the Major Commands.

The Army Air Forces had set a post-war goal of 70 groups; however, Congress balked at funding the ambitious undertaking. Instead, the USAAF had to downscale its plans, settling on 55 groups. Congress passed the National Security Act of September 1947, and soon after, the Air Force became a separate service with its own civilian service secretary, equal to the Army and Navy.

By 31 December 1947, the USAF was 55 groups strong, with ATC being allocated thirteen (13) training bases. Earlier in the year, the ATC commander, Lieutenant General John K. Cannon, had told General Carl A. Spaatz, USAF Chief of Staff, that ATC would do all it could to bring the new groups up to strength, but the training capability of ATC was extremely limited due to a severe lack of personnel and training funds.

The initial training bases of Air Training Command were:

- Randolph Field (later Randolph Air Force Base), Texas

2532d Army Air Forces (later Air Force) Base Unit
3510th Pilot Training Wing (Basic)

- Barksdale Field (Barksdale Air Force Base), Louisiana

331st Army Air Forces (later Air Force) Base Unit
3500th Pilot Training Wing (Advanced, Multi-Engine)

- Chanute Field (later Chanute Air Force Base), Illinois

3502d Army Air Forces Base Unit (Technical School)
3345th Technical Training Wing

- Fort Francis E. Warren (later F. E. Warren Air Force Base), Wyoming

3502d Army Air Forces (later Air Force) Base Unit (Technical School)
3450th Technical Training Wing

- Goodfellow Field (later Goodfellow Air Force Base), Texas

2533d Army Air Forces Base Unit
3545th Pilot Training Wing (Basic)

- Keesler Field (later Keesler Air Force Base), Mississippi

3704th Army Air Forces Base Unit (Technical School and Basic Training Center)
3380th Technical Training Wing

- Lackland Field (later Lackland Air Force Base), Texas

3502d Army Air Forces (later Air Force) Base Unit (Indoctrination Training)
3700th Military Training Wing

- Las Vegas Field (later Las Vegas Air Force Base,
  later Nellis Air Force Base), Nevada

3006th Army Air Forces Base Unit
3595th Pilot Training Wing (Advanced, Single-Engine)

- Lowry Field (later Lowry Air Force Base), Colorado

3705th Army Air Forces Base Unit (Technical School)
3415th Technical Training Wing

- Mather Field (later Mather Air Force Base), California

1505th Army Air Forces (later Air Force) Base Unit
3535th Bombardier Training Wing

- San Marcos Field, Texas (later San Marcos Air Force Base,
  later Gary Air Force Base)

2456th Army Air Forces (later Air Force) Base Unit
3585th Pilot Training Wing (Liaison-Helicopter)

- Scott Field (later Scott Air Force Base), Illinois

3505th Army Air Forces Base Unit (Technical School)
3310th Technical Training Wing

- Williams Field (later Williams Air Force Base), Arizona

3010th Army Air Forces (later Air Force) Base Unit
3525th Pilot Training Wing (Advanced, Single-Engine)

==== Training ====
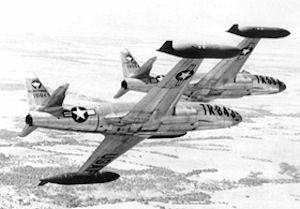
T-33A (Formerly F-80C) trainers over Williams AFB, Arizona, 1949

ATC's Flying Division began its first jet fighter transition course at Williams Field in 1946. However, by early 1947, the USAAF had sped up its conversion to jet aircraft. The only way training needs could be met was by limiting course quotas to commands already using jet aircraft. Also, the training program was handicapped by the fact that no dual-control jet trainer aircraft existed.

In addition, the pilot training program was consolidated into two classes, Basic and Advanced. Also, the wide variety of training aircraft were reduced to streamline the training program. Jet training aircraft and courses were also added, along with helicopter training as the new wartime technologies were added into the postwar Air Force inventory as fully operational weapons systems. Austere postwar military budgets led to additional consolidations and all of the flying programs suffered from shortages of aircraft replacement parts, qualified maintenance personnel, and instructors...problems that existed with the schools throughout the early postwar era.

Technical Division was given the responsibility of assembling and training two specialized arctic training teams. Their mission was to indoctrinate USAAF (later USAF) units and individuals destined for polar assignments in personal survival and in the care and use of equipment in cold weather climates. In March 1947, budgetary cuts caused a major reduction in force of graded civilian employees. Technical Division had no choice but to fill empty civilian instructor slots with military personnel. That left the schools with a high percentage of instructors with little, if any, teaching experience and, in some cases, very limited knowledge of course material. In fact, many of these new instructors had just graduated from the courses they were now expected to teach.

Indoctrination Division consolidated all basic training at what became Lackland Air Force Base in 1946. Separation criteria were progressively lowered for both officer and enlisted personnel as part of the postwar demobilization. Training Command losses from separations were not made up by gains from recruits and returnees and shortages were particularly acute in maintenance, mess, clerical, and medical personnel. In 1948, Air Training Command began rebuilding its training complex, but the command was still reeling from the heavy losses it sustained in its instructor force by demobilization.

===== Berlin Airlift =====
By 1948, ATC was still reeling from the heavy losses it sustained in its instructor force in 1947. Then the personnel withdrawals that had to be made in support of the Berlin Airlift and the expansion of Strategic Air Command combined to handicap even more the training bases at the same time that pilot production increased. Plans called for ATC to add five additional flight training bases and by year's end the command had already activated four: Perrin AFB, Texas; Enid AFB, Oklahoma; Waco AFB, Texas; and Las Vegas AFB, Nevada.

In a 17 September letter to the field, Headquarters USAF directed all commands to release many highly experienced personnel in support of the Berlin Airlift. Officials in Air Training Command were so concerned about the effect this loss of personnel would have on mission accomplishment that a return letter was sent to Washington asking which of the new flying training bases—Waco or Enid—was to be written off. The only way ATC was able to provide personnel for these schools was by taking individuals from other bases.

===== Consolidation of Divisions =====
When the Berlin Blockade ended in 1949, the Air Force was again hit with reductions that resulted in forced reorganizations and reduced training. Austere postwar military budgets led to additional consolidations and all of the technical programs suffered from shortages of instructors...problems that existed with the schools throughout the early postwar era. The last half of 1949 was an exercise in austerity. President Harry S. Truman decided that the country could only afford a 48-group Air Force and with only a minimum of operating funds available, the Secretary of Defense directed major spending cuts throughout the Department of Defense (DOD). In a reorganization, Technical Division, Air Training Command was inactivated on 14 November 1949 when Air Training Command absorbed its subordinate Divisions into its command organization to comply with the budget reduction directive.

==== Korean War ====
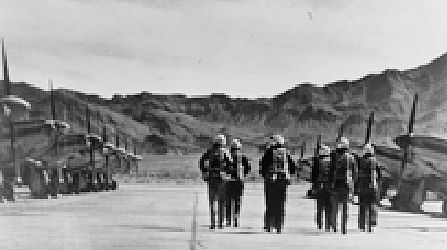
Students prepare to take off on a cross-country flight in F-51 Mustang fighters at Nellis AFB, Nevada, 1950.

The outbreak of the Korean War on 25 June 1950 indicated that ATC would soon see an increase in training requirements. By 1 July, the Air Force had directed ATC to accelerate training to fill the needs of a new 95-wing Air Force. A few days later, ATC found itself with a new mission: combat crew training.

ATC's primary mission in the Korean War was to train pilots, navigators and enlisted aircrew for combat and to fill the need of the expanded 95-wing USAF. The first school opened at Nellis AFB, Nevada. In August, the Air Staff raised the rate of pilot production from 3,000 to 4,000 per year, and by the end of the year, it had climbed to 7,200. At the same time, the need for training technicians also rose. As it had in World War II, ATC met the increased training requirements by contracting with civilian schools.

- Bainbridge Air Base, Georgia

3306th Pilot Training Group (Contract Primary)

- Bartow Air Base, Florida

3303d Pilot Training Group (Contract Primary)

- Graham Air Base, Florida

3300th Pilot Training Group (Contract Primary)

- Hondo Air Base, Texas

3304th Pilot Training Group (Contract Primary)

- Malden Air Base, Missouri

3305th Pilot Training Group (Contract Primary)

- Marana Air Base, Arizona

3307th Pilot Training Group (Contract Primary)

- Moore Air Base, Texas

3301st Pilot Training Group (Contract Primary)

- Spence Air Base, Georgia

3302d Pilot Training Group (Contract Primary)

- Stallings Air Base, North Carolina

: 3308th Pilot Training Group (Contract Primary)

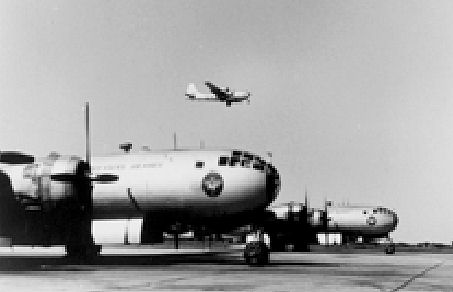
B-29s line the ramp at Randolph AFB as one takes off on a training mission, c. 1950.

These were former World War II pilot training airfields that were placed in reserve status after the war. Air Training Command applied the "Air Base" designator to these military-supervised/contractor-operated flying training bases. At about the same time, ATC redesignated the 3595th Pilot Training Wing (Advanced Single-Engine) as the 3595th Training Wing (Combat Crew). On 17 July 1950, Nellis AFB began a special training program to provide 115 combat-ready F-51 Mustang pilots for Far East Air Forces and 92 combat-ready F-80 Shooting Star pilots to serve as replacements for casualties in the first months of the Korean campaign.

The Korean War caused Lackland AFB, Texas to overflow with trainees. During the first two weeks of 1951, the population at Lackland AFB jumped from 36,513 to over 70,000 personnel. With the large influx of enlisted personnel requiring indoctrination training, Air Training Command took interest in the former Sampson Naval Training Station, New York for use as an addition Basic Military Training base for enlisted personnel. Custody of most of the property of the training center was transferred to the Air Force in 1950, and the Air Force named the facility Sampson Air Force Base on 15 November 1950. The Air Force spent about $6 million on renovations and Air Training Command established the 3650th Indoctrination (later Military Training) Wing to manage the base and conduct Basic Training. The first trainees arrived on 1 February 1951, with the base employing about 700 civilians and had 600 permanent party uniformed USAF personnel. Eventually, about 6,000 Air Force recruits would be trained at Sampson AFB. The Air Force also built a runway and other facilities at Sampson and converted the base to its needs. By 1953, a single paved 5000 foot north–south runway (Rwy 17/35) was completed and a control tower, fire station and aircraft parking ramp was built on the west side, with B-25 Mitchell, C-47 Skytrain, and C-45 Expeditor aircraft assigned.

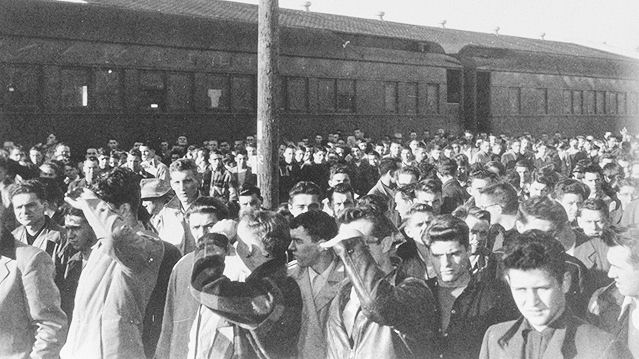
In early 1951 recruits arrived by the train load, more than doubling the population of Lackland AFB.

In addition to Sampson AFB, a third BMT center was established at Parks AFB, California to accommodate new enlistees. A former World War II Navy Seebee training facility known as Camp Parks, the Air Force had to completely rebuild the base. Base personnel were initially housed in temporary facilities and ate from a field mess. The first group of Airmen arrived at Camp Parks in the Summer of 1951; mass training began in March 1952.

The USAF had Far East Air Force engaging in direct combat, and Tactical Air Command mobilizing reserve forces and deploying active duty units and personnel to the combat zone. Strategic Air Command, while not deploying its nuclear-capable strategic bomber force, brought B-29 Superfortresses out of five years of storage and deployed them to Okinawa with combat crews from active duty and reserve units.

Beginning on 24 July 1950, all technical training programs went on a six-day-a-week operation. That reduced by almost 17 percent the amount of time it took to train an enlisted technician. Multiple shifts also ran. While this increased the need for more instructors, it limited the amount of housing and dining facilities needed. Along with this, the amount of dormitory space given each student was reduced from 72 square feet (6.7 m^{2}) to 60, and at Keesler AFB and Sheppard AFB the space was even less...only 50 square feet (4.6 m^{2}) per student. Finally, the interval between class entries also decreased. All of this was an effort to train students as quickly as possible and get them in the field.

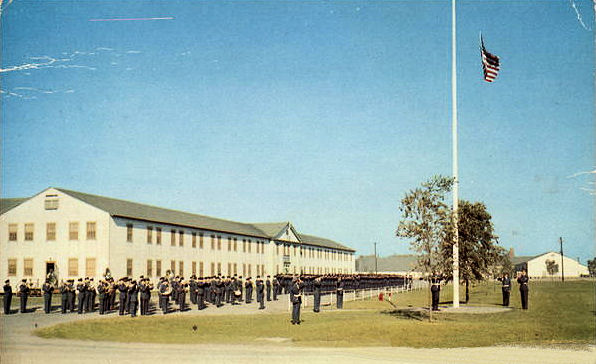
Retreat formation in front of Base HQ, Sampson AFB, New York

The announcement of unlimited recruiting in December 1950 caused major problems for Lackland AFB. Clothing and bedding were in short supply, and it got to the point where new recruits were issued only the minimum essentials. Clothing stocks had to be drastically reduced at other ATC bases so recruits could receive essential clothing—although it was impossible to provide exact sizes. Lackland AFB had only been constructed to handle about 28,000 recruits, but by January 1951 the number exceeded 70,000. Officials had no choice but to establish a tent city. Lackland AFB completely exhausted the Air Force's supply of steel folding cots and mattresses. Others had to make do with canvas cots. At one time, the base had almost 10,000 recruits sleeping on canvas cots, without mattresses.

There was no time to prepare, and that meant the quality of training suffered...both flying and technical training. Because troops in the Far East received priority in the supply system, ATC also faced across-the-board shortages in equipment such as armament, radar, aircraft spares, maintenance items, clothing, bedding, and office equipment. Shortages of spare parts even caused a reduction in helicopter training at San Marcos AFB and B-29 training at Randolph AFB later in the war.

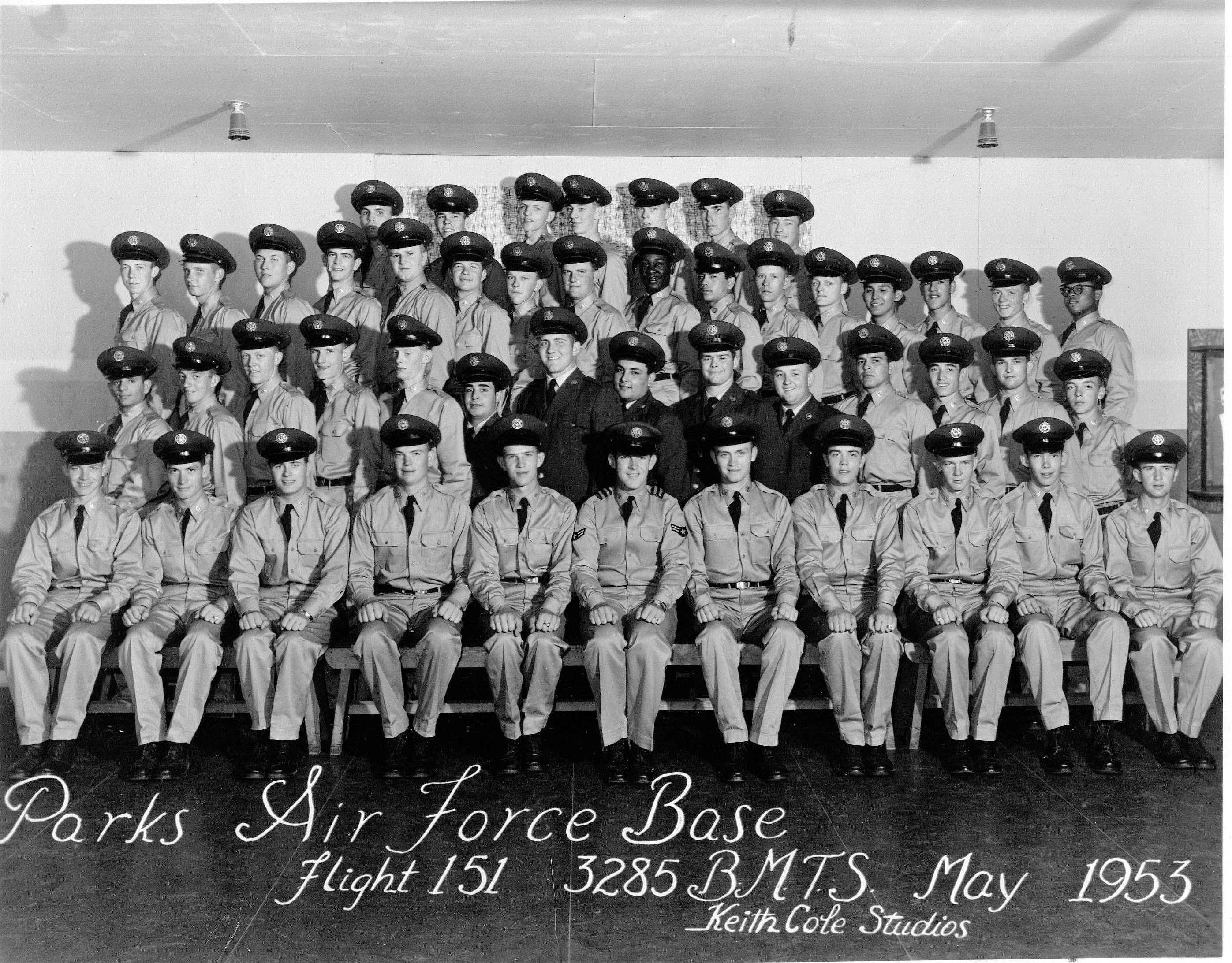
BMT Graduates May 1953, Parks AFB, California

The Air Force initially resorted to an involuntary recall of Air Force Reservists and Air National Guardsmen to fill the gap while Air Training Command expanded its training efforts to meet wartime demands. By 1 July, the Air Force had directed ATC to accelerate training to fill the needs of a new 95-wing Air Force. A few days later ATC found itself with a new mission: combat crew training.

As a direct result of the rapid expansion of the training needs of the Air Force as a result of the Korean War, ATC reversed its 1949 decision to eliminate training divisions and consolidate all command level organizations at its headquarters. Headquarters USAF approved the decentralization in early 1951. While ATC had sought numerical designations for its new air forces—Thirtieth Flying Training and Thirty-first Technical Training Air Forces—USAF officials recommended functional rather than numerical designations. Thus, ATC's new subordinate organizations became the Flying Training Air Force (FTAF) and the Technical Training Air Force.

Plans called for FTAF to be headquartered at Randolph AFB and TTAF at Lowry AFB; however, the unexpected escalation of training at those bases meant facilities were not available. Thus, ATC established the FTAF headquarters at Waco, Texas near James Connally AFB, and TTAF took up residence at the Gulf Coast Military Academy near Keesler AFB. A third organization, the Crew Training Air Force, was activated on 16 March 1952 and headquartered at Randolph AFB.

==== Cold War ====
Even as combat continued in Korea, during 1952 the Air Force expanded to meet the threat of the Cold War with the Soviet Union in Europe, and potentially a direct conflict with Communist China in Asia. As the Air Force expanded to meet those threats, ATC continued to expand as it activated five more flying training bases, bringing the number of primary installations to 42.

During the last half of 1952, however, the volume of training conducted steadily decreased as the supply of trained pilots and technicians met the Air Force demand in almost all areas. Air Training Command reached its Korean War peak of 176,446 personnel in June.

The most important change in the training program involved the inauguration of four-phase pilot training. Phase one of the program included 12 weeks of preflight training. The second phase, called primary training, required 18 weeks and featured 20 hours of T-6 Texan flight training. Phase three, basic flight, lasted 16 weeks and included 130 hours of flying. This phase included flying in both the T-6 or T-28 and in tactical aircraft (T-33 jet trainer, F-80 jet fighter, F-51 conventional fighter, or B-25 multi-engine bomber). At the end of the third phase, cadets were commissioned and received pilot wings. When ATC completed its program of decentralization by activating the CTAF in March 1952, it then provided combat crew training to the major combat commands. Crew Training constituted the fourth phase of pilot training and covered an average of 12 weeks.

With the end of the Korean War and cutbacks in the military budget afterwards, Air Training Command discontinued its basic training schools at Sampson and Parks AFB on 1 July 1956.

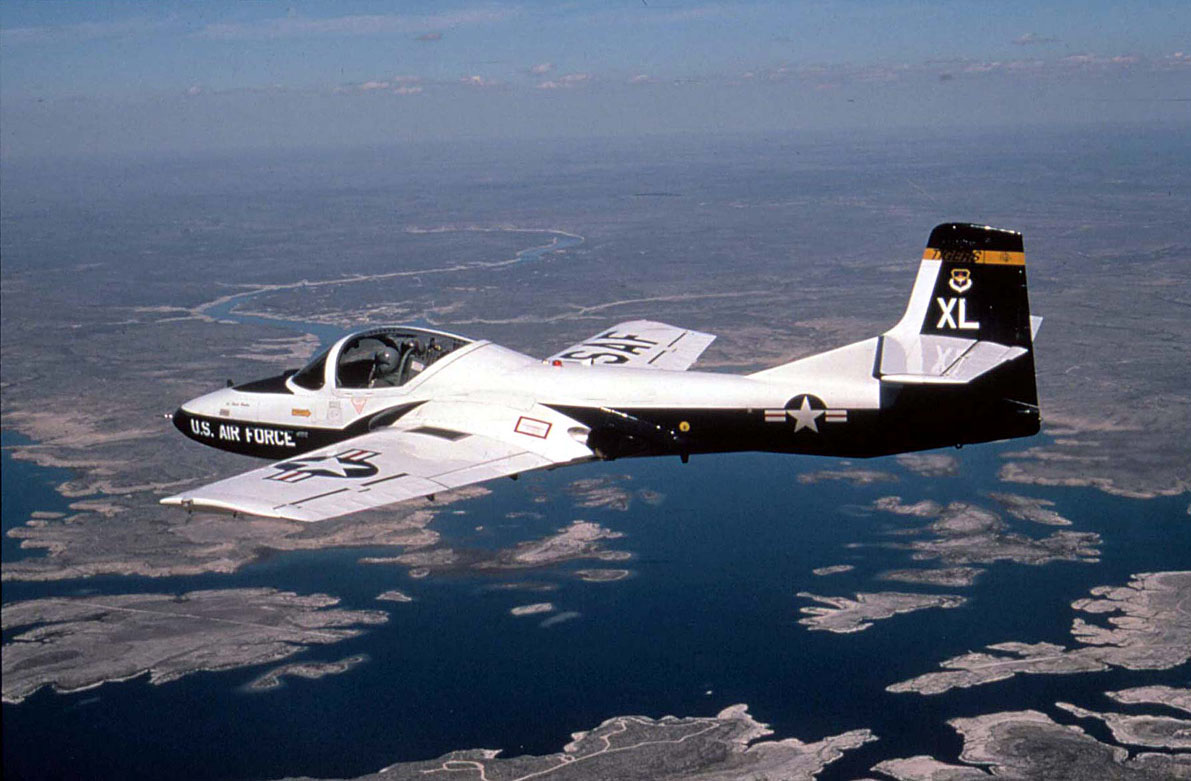
A T-37 Tweet from the 85th Flying Training Squadron, Laughlin Air Force Base, Texas, flies over Lake Amistad during a training mission.

In 1960, ATC began looking at a new training concept, consolidated pilot training (CPT), combining preflight, primary, and basic instruction. Secretary of the Air Force Dudley C. Sharp approved the idea in March 1960, and Air Training Command intended to have the training program in operation by March 1961. At the same time, Secretary Sharp approved initiation of a consolidated pilot training program, ATC decided to replace all civilian flying instructors with military officers and to phase out all contract primary schools. The last of these closed in spring 1961.

Shortly after the beginning of the Korean War, the Air Staff transferred most of the combat aircrew training mission from the operational commands to ATC, placing an even heavier burden on the command. Air Force directed Air Training Command to double pilot production to 7,200 per year, and to increase technician production to 225,000 per year. With the end of the Korean War on 27 July 1953, Air Training Command again began to reduce its training activities.

Many of the command's facilities were transferred to Strategic Air Command (SAC) and Tactical Air Command (TAC) in the 1950s. Over the next ten years, ATC reduced its bases from 43 to 16, and its personnel from 271,849 to 79,272. In large part this was due to the return of the crew training mission to the operational commands. In 1958, ATC returned bomber crew training to SAC and fighter crew training to TAC.

At about the same time, ATC gained another mission when it took over responsibility for the recruiting mission in 1954. Then in October 1957, Headquarters Air Training Command moved from Scott AFB, Illinois, to Randolph AFB, Texas, in order to reduce operating costs by being closer to its primary training facilities. Its three training air forces were inactivated between 1 July 1957 and 1 April 1958.

One year later, the command began experimenting with eliminating propeller-driven aircraft from primary pilot training. "Project All-Jet" was a success, and in 1959, ATC began replacing the North American T-28 "Trojan" propeller-driven trainer with the Cessna T-37 "Tweety Bird" jet engine primary trainer.

==== Vietnam War era ====
In the early 1960s, ATC converted from specialized to generalized undergraduate pilot training (UPT). During this time, the command retired the World War II–era North American B-25 "Mitchell" it had been using for advanced multi-engine training under specialized UPT. Under generalized UPT, all pilots received the same training, regardless of what type of operational aircraft they would ultimately fly. ATC acquired the North American T-38 "Talon" jet, and it became the main advanced trainer aircraft for all student pilots.

The first T-37/T-38 undergraduate pilot training course was held at Webb AFB, Texas, in February 1962. During the next few years, increasing numbers of US service members went to Southeast Asia as military advisers to the South Vietnamese armed forces, but the effect on ATC was negligible. When president Lyndon B. Johnson increased America's military involvement in South Vietnam in 1965, there was a resultant increase in Air Force military and technical training. However, unlike previous wars, the Vietnam War did not result in a drastic increase in the command's bases or personnel. This was because ATC reverted to a split-phase program of basic military training, and because the command's training philosophy was geared toward generalized rather than specialized technical training.

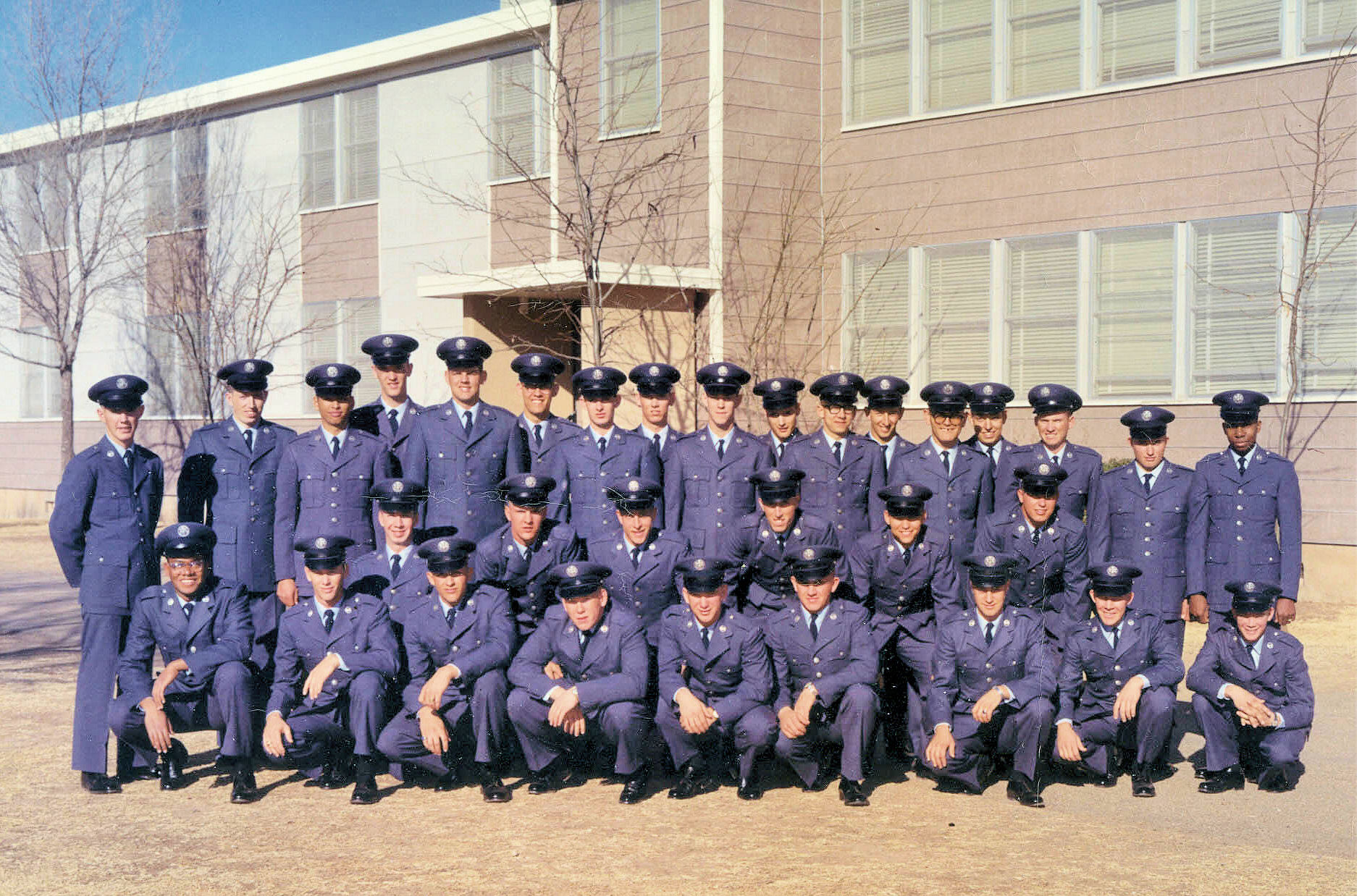
USAF Basic Training graduation photo, 3332d BMTS Flight 495, December 1966, Amarillo AFB, Texas/

Pilot training gradually increased as the war dragged on. But officials reassigned many of ATC's best instructor pilots to the operational commands, creating severe flying training difficulties. Then in 1969, ATC's involvement in a program of training and equipping the Republic of Vietnam Air Force to become a self-sufficient, 40-squadron air force caused technical training production to surge by approximately 50 percent, to over 310,000. This increase, however, was not to last long.

In February 1966 ATC's Amarillo Air Technical Training Center became a Basic Training Center with the formation of the 3330th Basic Military School due to an outbreak of spinal meningitis at Lackland AFB. A personnel processing squadron was added the same month to support the school. In 1967 the center's facilities covered 5,273 acres (21 km^{2}) and had about 16,300 assigned personnel. However, due to the influx of trainees for the Vietnam buildup, Amarillo continued to conduct Split-Phase Basic Military Training for enlisted airmen with Lackland AFB.

Strategic Air Command began closing down its operations at Amarillo AFB in early 1968. Personnel and equipment of the 461st Bombardment Wing were transferred to other SAC organizations during the spring, and the wing was declared non-operational at the end of February. The 461st BW was discontinued and inactivated on 25 May 1968. The last BMT class at Amarillo AFB graduated on 11 December 1968, and the base closed on 31 December 1968.

==== Post-Vietnam era ====
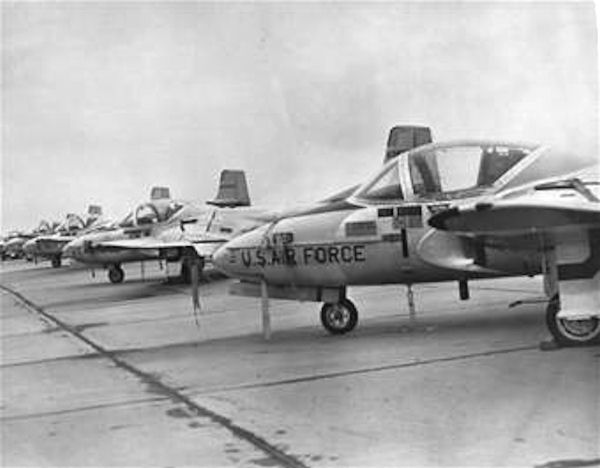
ATC T-37 trainers at Vance AFB, Oklahoma, 1971

As popular support for the Vietnam War waned and American forces began to pull out of Southeast Asia, ATC's training requirements gradually diminished. President Richard Nixon ended the draft on 30 June 1973, converting the military to an all-volunteer force. Also, during this period the percentage of recruits with a high school education declined to the lowest point in the history of the Air Force. These factors combined to make the 1970s yet another era of change for Air Training Command.

One change was in the command's approach to technical training. Poor retention rates and the generally lower quality of recruits prompted ATC to shift from a "career oriented" technical training philosophy to one of teaching only those tasks recruits needed during their first enlistment. This reduced the length of training while also lowering training costs. To supplement on-duty training, and in hopes of attracting higher-quality recruits, Air Force established the Community College of the Air Force in 1972 as part of ATC.

Another change came in the form of increased opportunities for women. The first class of 10 women pilots in the USAF received their wings on 2 September 1977, and the first class of female graduates from undergraduate navigator training received their wings at Mather AFB, California, on 12 October 1977.

Other changes came out of the need to reduce training costs in order to fund the F-15, F-16 and A-10 modernization programs. These included closing Craig and Webb Air Force Bases, increasing reliance on flight simulators, and reducing flying hours in undergraduate pilot training.

Still another change was the way in which ATC conducted undergraduate navigator training. In 1978, navigator training shifted from generalized to specialized, with follow-on advanced training specific to the student's career track.

In keeping with the consolidations of the 1970s, Air Training Command assumed responsibility in 1978 for two additional functions: Air University and cryptologic training. Air Force transferred Air University to ATC effective 15 May 1978. This consolidation brought all professional military education under the same roof as basic military, technical, and flying training. However, Air Force officials soon became concerned this arrangement lowered the visibility and diminished the importance of Air War College and the other schools.

Therefore, on 1 July 1983 – little more than five years after the realignment – Air Force once again conveyed separate command status upon Air University. The USAF Security Service at Goodfellow AFB, Texas, had conducted all Air Force cryptologic training since 1958. On 1 July 1978, both Goodfellow and the cryptologic training mission transferred to ATC.

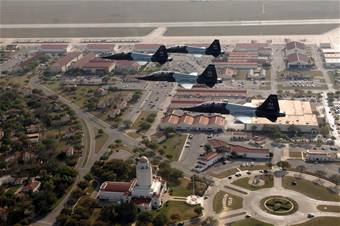
T-38s overfly Randolph AFB

During the military expansion of the Reagan Administration in the early 1980s, ATC was able to improve training in several areas. The command added more flying hours to the pilot training program and extended the course by three weeks.

In the fall of 1981, ATC began training pilots from North Atlantic Treaty Organization (NATO) countries under the Euro-NATO Joint Jet Pilot Training (ENJJPT) program at Sheppard AFB, Texas.

In 1984, expanded training budgets allowed the command to change back to a philosophy of training technical personnel to the fullest extent possible, rather than limiting training to the skills needed only for the first enlistment. Technical training courses, especially those in "sortie-producing" specialties, were expanded from generalist courses to specialized instruction. By 1985, the average length for these courses had risen to nearly 17 weeks.

However, several events in the middle and late 1980s brought about the next cycle of restricted military spending affecting ATC's mission. By Fiscal Year 1988, funding for technical training dropped by over 15 percent, and the command had to institute a civilian hiring freeze. Then, in rapid succession beginning in 1989, the Berlin Wall came down, the Soviet Union collapsed, and the Cold War was over. Suddenly, the threat from the East that had dominated American military thinking for decades was gone. Congress quickly cut military spending in response to the diminished threat.

==== Persian Gulf War and post-Cold War reorganization of the 1990s ====
In the midst of these world changes, the Persian Gulf War erupted when Saddam Hussein's Iraqi forces invaded Kuwait on 2 August 1990. In support of wartime demands, ATC deployed over 3,000 command personnel to other commands. Then ATC called up 2,387 individual mobilization augmentee (IMA) Air Force Reservists and over 1,000 inactive Air Force Reservists and Air Force retirees to fill active duty positions vacated by wartime deployments.

Air Force also activated ATC's 11th Contingency Hospital and deployed it to the United Kingdom to treat expected casualties from the war. Fortunately, the Persian Gulf War did not produce large numbers of American casualties, and the conflict was soon over.

Air Training Command got on with the task of consolidating training and in Fiscal Years 1993 and 1994, executed BRAC-directed closures of Chanute AFB, Mather AFB, Williams AFB, and Lowry AFB. However, despite the return to tightened budgets, ATC did not back off from its commitment to fully train personnel to be mission ready upon arrival at their first operational assignment.

An especially important Year of Training initiative was the recommendation to create a single, coherent education and training structure for officer, enlisted, and civilian personnel. As a result of this recommendation, Air Force again merged Air University and ATC, redesignating the command as the Air Education and Training Command (AETC) on 1 July 1993.

=== Lineage ===
- Established as Air Corps Flying Training Command on 23 January 1942

Re-designated: Army Air Forces Flying Training Command c. 15 March 1942
Re-designated: Army Air Forces Training Command on 31 July 1943
Re-designated: Air Training Command on 1 July 1946
Re-designated: Air Education and Training Command on 1 July 1993

=== Assignments ===
As designated Air Training Command

- Headquarters, United States Army Air Forces, 1 July 1946
- Headquarters United States Air Force, 17 September 1947 – 1 July 1993

=== Headquarters ===
As designated Air Training Command

- Barksdale Field (later, AFB), Louisiana, 1 July 1946
- Scott Air Force Base, Illinois 17 October 1949
- Randolph AFB, Texas, 15 September 1957 – 1 July 1993

== Major Training Units and Bases ==
As designated under Air Training Command

- Divisions:

Technical Division, Air Training Command, 1 July 1946 – 14 November 1949
Scott AFB, Illinois
Indoctrination Division, Air Training Command, 1 Nov 1946 – 1 November 1949
Lackland AFB, Texas
Flying Division, Air Training Command, 1 July 1946 – 14 November 1949
Air Training Communications Division: 1 October 1990 – 1 October 1991
Randolph AFB, Texas

- Air Forces:

Crew Training Air Force: 16 Mar 1952 – 1 Jul 1957
Randolph AFB, Texas
Flying Training Air Force: 1 May 1951 – 1 Apr 1958
James Connally AFB, Texas
Technical Training Air Force: 1 May 1951 – 1 Jun 1958
Gulfport AFB, Mississippi

- Centers:

Goodfellow Technical Training (later, Goodfellow Training) Center: 1 Mar 1985 – 1 Jul 1993
Goodfellow AFB, Texas

Human Resources Research Center: 10 Oct 1949 – 1 Apr 1953
Goodfellow AFB, Texas

San Antonio Procurement (later, San Antonio Contracting) Center: 1 Jan 1977 – 1 Apr 1989
San Antonio, Texas

USAF Aerospace Medical Center: 1 Oct 1959 – 1 Nov 1961
Brooks AFB, Texas

USAF Instrument Flight Center: 1 Oct 1983 – 1 May 1992
Randolph AFB, Texas

USAF Occupational Measurement Center: 1 May 1978 – 1 Oct 1990
Randolph AFB, Texas

- Agency:

San Antonio Real Property Maintenance Agency: 15 Feb 1977 – 1 Oct 1989
San Antonio, Texas

- Service:

USAF Recruiting Center: 8 Jul 1959 – 1 July 1993
San Antonio, Texas

- Command:

San Antonio Joint Military Medical Command: 16 Feb 1987 – 1 Oct 1991
San Antonio, Texas

- Corps:

Air Force Reserve Officers Training Corps: 30 Jun 1983 – 1 Jul 1993
Maxwell AFB, Alabama

- Wings:

Combat Crew Training

3510th Combat Crew Training (Medium Bombardment) (later, 3510th Pilot Training) Wing, 1 Apr 1958 – 1 May 1972
Randolph AFB, Texas

3550th Combat Crew Training (Interceptor) (later, 3550th Flying Training) Wing, 1 Apr 1958 – 1 Dec 1973
Moody AFB, Georgia

3555th Combat Crew Training (Interceptor) (later 3550th Flying Training) Wing, 1 Apr 1958 – 1 Jul 1962
Perrin AFB, Texas

3635th Combat Crew Training (Survival) (later, 3635th Flying Training) Wing, 1 Apr 1958 – 15 Jun 1966
Stead AFB, Nevada

3636th Combat Crew Training (Survival) (later, 3636th Crew Training) Group, 1 Apr 1971 – 1 Jul 1993
Fairchild AFB, Washington

Field Training

3499th Field Training Wing (Command Leadership) 1 Jun 1958 – 1 Sep 1959
Chanute AFB, Illinois

Flying/Pilot/Navigator Training

12th Flying Training Wing 1 May 1972 – 1 Jul 1993
Randolph AFB, Texas

3650th Pilot Training Wing 15 Feb 1969 – 1 June 1972
Later: 14th Flying Training Wing 1 Jun 1972 – 1 Jul 1993
Columbus AFB, Mississippi

3615th Flying Training Wing 1 Apr 1958 – 1 Jul 1972
Later: 29th Flying Training Wing 1 Jul 1972 – 30 Sep 1977
Craig AFB, Alabama

3640th Pilot Training Wing 1 Apr 1958 – 1 Aug 1972
Later: 38th Flying Training Wing 1 Aug 1972 – 30 Sep 1973; 1 Dec 1973 – 1 Dec 1975
Laredo AFB, Texas

3646th Pilot Training Wing 16 Oct 1961 – 1 Sep 1972
Later: 47th Flying Training Wing 1 Sep 1972 – 1 Jul 1993
Laughlin AFB, Texas

3500th Pilot Training Wing 1 Apr 1958 – 1 Oct 1972
Later: 64th Flying Training Wing 1 Oct 1972 – 1 Jul 1993
Reese AFB, Texas

3575th Pilot Training Wing 1 Apr 1958 – 1 Nov 1972
Later: 71st Flying Training Wing 1 Nov 1972 – 1 Jul 1993
Vance AFB, Oklahoma

3560th Pilot Training Wing 1 Apr 1958 – 1 Dec 1972
Later: 78th Flying Training Wing 1 Dec 1972 – 30 Sep 1977
Webb AFB, Texas

3630th Flying Training Wing 10 Dec 1965 – 1 Apr 1967; 15 Mar 1971 – 1 Jan 1973
Later: 80th Flying Training Wing 1 Jan 1973 – 1 Jul 1993
Sheppard AFB, Texas

3525th Pilot Training Wing 1 Oct 1960 – 1 Feb 1973
Later: 82d Flying Training (later, 82d Training) Wing 1 Feb 1973 – 31 Mar 1993
Williams AFB, Arizona

323d Flying Training Wing 1 Apr 1973 – 1 Jul 1993
Mather AFB, California

3505th Pilot Training Wing 1 Apr 1958 – 1 Dec 1960
Greenville AFB, Mississippi

3545th Pilot Training Wing 1 Apr-1 Oct 1958
Goodfellow AFB, Texas

Medical

59th Medical (formerly, Wilford Hall USAF Medical Center) Wing 15 Jan – 16 Feb 1987; 1 Oct 1991 – 1 Jul 1993
Lackland AFB, Texas

Military Training

3700th Military Training Wing (later, Lackland Military Training Center; Air Force Military Training Center Wing; Lackland Training Center): 1 Jun 1958 – 1 Jul 1993
Lackland AFB, Texas

Navigator Training

3535th Navigator Training Wing 1 Apr 1958 – 1 Apr 1973
Mather AFB, California
3565th Navigator Training Wing 1 Apr 1958 – 1 Jan 1966
James Connally AFB, Texas
3610th Navigator Training Wing 1 Apr 1958 – 1 Jul 1962
Harlingen AFB, Texas

Technical Training

3320th Technical Training Wing (later, Amarillo Technical Training Center): 1 Jun 1958 – 31 Dec 1968
Amarillo AFB, Texas

3345th Technical Training Wing (later, Chanute Technical Training Center): 1 Jun 1958 – 1 Jul 1993
Chanute AFB, Illinois

3380th Technical Training Wing (later, Keesler Technical Training Center; Keesler Training Center): 1 Jun 1958 – 1 Jul 1993
Keesler AFB, Mississippi

3750th Technical Training Wing (later, Sheppard Technical Training Center; Sheppard Training Center): 1 Jun 1958 – 1 Jul 1993
Sheppard AFB, Texas

3415th Technical Training Wing (later Lowry Technical Training; Lowry Training Center): 1 Jun 1958 – 1 Jul 1993
Lowry AFB, Colorado

3480th Technical Training Wing 1 Jul 1978 – 1 Mar 1985
USAF Cryptology Training Center
Goodfellow AFB, Texas

Recruiting:

3500th USAF Recruiting Wing: 1 Jun 1958 – 8 Jul 1959
Wright-Patterson AFB, Ohio

- Hospital:

3545th USAF Hospital 1 Oct 1958 – 30 Jun 1971
Goodfellow AFB, Texas

- College:

Community College of the Air Force: 1 Apr 1972 – 1 Jul 1993
Maxwell AFB, Alabama

- Schools:

USAF Medical Service School: 1 Oct 1961 – 7 Jun 1971
Brooks AFB, Texas
USAF Officer Training School (later, School of Military Sciences, Officer; Officer Training): 1 Jun 1972 – 14 Nov 1986
Lackland AFB / Medina Annex, Texas
