= McGrath Army Airbase =

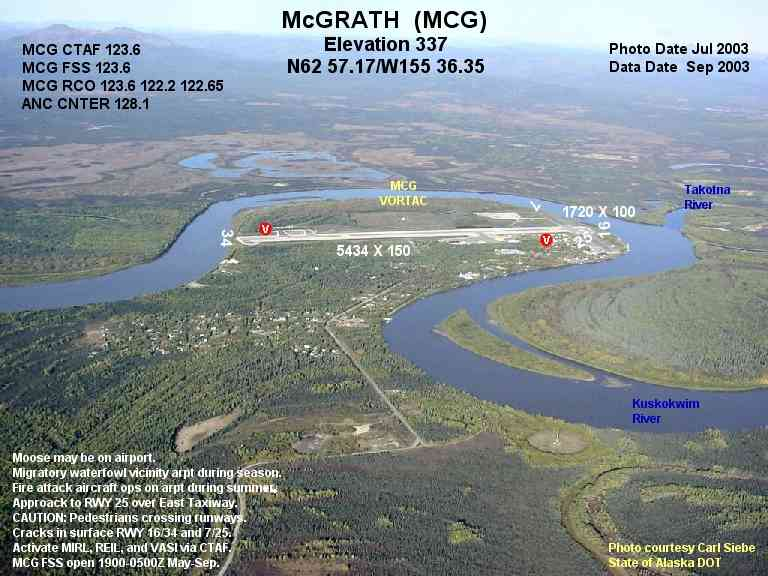
- IATA: none; ICAO: none

Summary
- Airport type: Military
- Owner: United States Army
- Serves: McGrath, Alaska
- Elevation AMSL: 341 ft / 104 m
- Coordinates: 62°57′10″N 155°36′25″W

Map
- Location of airport in Alaska

Runways
Direction	Length		Surface
Direction	ft	m	Surface
16/34	5,936	1,809	Asphalt
5/23	2,000	610	Gravel

McGrath Army Airbase is former United States Army airbase located in McGrath, a city in the Yukon-Koyukuk Census Area of the U.S. state of Alaska.

During its construction, equipment to construct the facility arrived too late in the season, as the ground had already frozen over. As a result, it was ordered that the equipment be brought to Umnak Island and Cold Bay, Alaska, which built Fort Glenn Army Airbase and Fort Randall Army Airfield, respectively. Both of those airfields later played a part in repelling the Japanese Attack on Dutch Harbor.

== See also ==
- Alaska World War II Army Airfields
- Air Transport Command
- Northwest Staging Route
- List of airports in Alaska
