= Thornbrough Air Force Base =

- Cold Bay, Alaska in the United States
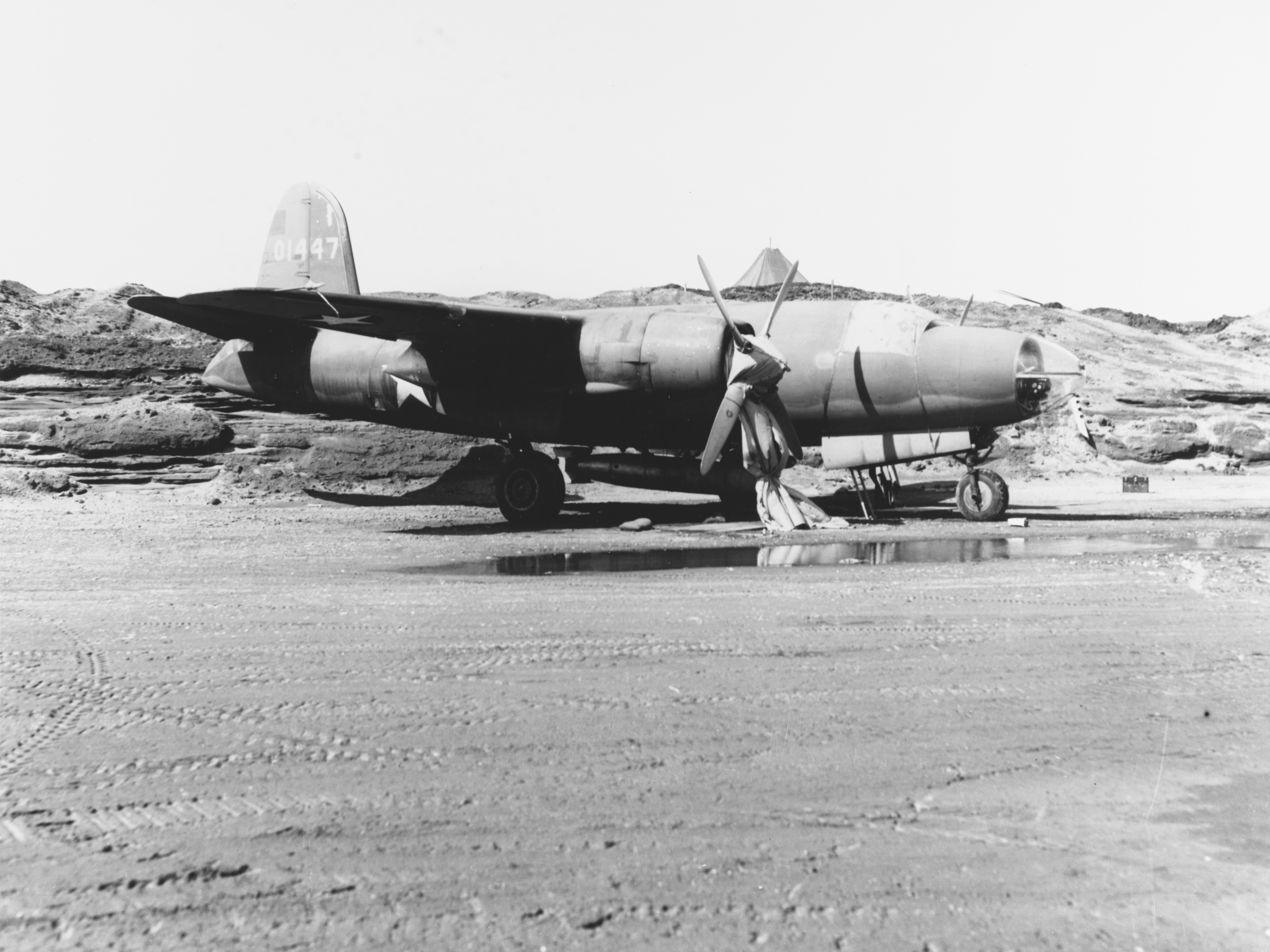
- A Martin B-26 Marauder of the US Army Air Forces at Fort Randall Army Airfield in May 1942 which later became Thornbrough AFB

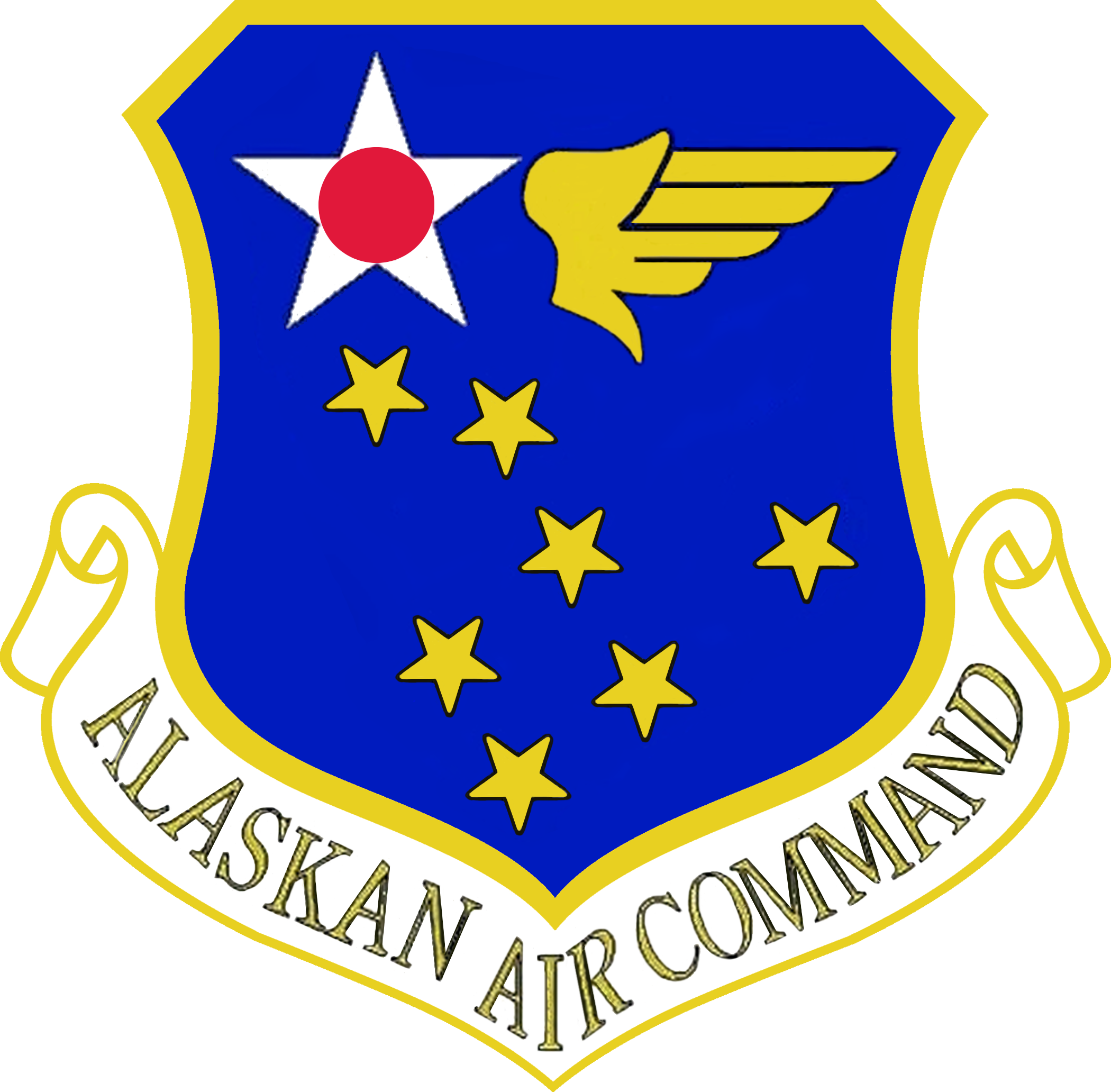

Site information
- Type: US Air Force Base
- Owner: Department of Defense
- Operator: US Air Force
- Controlled by: Alaskan Air Command
- Condition: Closed

Location
- Location within Alaska Location within North America
- Coordinates: 55°12′19″N 162°43′28″W

Site history
- Built: 1941–1942 (as Fort Randall Army Airfield)
- In use: 1942–1953
- Fate: Became Cold Bay Airport

Airfield information
- Elevation: 96 feet (29 m) AMSL

Thornbrough Air Force Base is a former facility of the United States Air Force in Cold Bay, Alaska built in 1941. Following its closure in 1953, it was redeveloped into Cold Bay Airport.

== History ==
=== US Army Air Forces period (1941–1947) ===
The airport was constructed during World War II as Fort Randall Army Airfield during the secret military buildup of the Territory of Alaska that began in 1941. Originally, the equipment was supposed to construct McGrath Army Airbase, but the ground had frozen by the time that the equipment arrived. Disguised as civilian employees of the Blair Canning and Packing Company, United States Army personnel in civilian clothes were shipped to Cold Bay. Construction began in December 1941, and the airfield was ready for operation by March 1942. Because of the foresight of Alaska's military commanders, the new airfield, along with another new secret airfield, Cape Field at Umnak, was ready to contribute to the defense of Alaska against Imperial Japanese Navy air attack during the Battle of Dutch Harbor in June 1942. The airfield at Cold Bay remained operational throughout World War II.

Known units assigned to Fort Randall Army Airfield (AAF) were:

- 73d Bombardment Squadron, numerous short dates, 1942–1943
- 344th Fighter Squadron, numerous short dates, 1942–1943
- 54th Fighter Squadron, June–July 1942
- 11th Fighter Squadron, May–September 1942

Fort Randall AAF was also used by the United States Navy during the Aleutian campaign. A two-gun 6-inch (152-mm) naval gun battery was located at Grant Point. One gun is on display near the town dump. A four-gun 155 mm gun battery on Panama mounts was located at Mortensen's Lagoon at Thin Point. The HECP bunker still exists at Pride Lake.

In the spring and summer of 1945, Cold Bay was the site of the largest and most ambitious transfer program of World War II, Project Hula, in which the United States transferred 149 ships and craft to the Soviet Union and trained 12,000 Soviet personnel in their operation in anticipation of the Soviet Union entering the war against Japan. Fort Randall provided housing and classroom space for the instructors and trainees. At any given time, about 1,500 American personnel were at Cold Bay and Fort Randall during Project Hula. The area to the southeast of the Fort Randall Air Air Field runways was known as "Navy Town". In addition to housing, this area also included a theater, hospital and a runway.

=== US Air Force period (1947–1953) ===
The airfield was named Thornbrough Air Force Base in 1948 for Captain George W. Thornbrough, a U.S. Army Air Forces Martin B-26 Marauder pilot. Captain Thornbrough fought during the Battle of Dutch Harbor in June 1942, bravely attacking a Japanese aircraft carrier that was launching strike aircraft at Dutch Harbor. Although his torpedo struck the carrier, it failed to explode. Captain Thornbrough returned to his airfield to refuel and rearm and then took off to rejoin the fight. The aircraft and entire crew were lost during their return from this mission, when they were unable to land at Cold Bay. The wreckage of Captain Thornbrough's aircraft was found 50 miles (80 km) from Cold Bay on the north side of the Alaska Peninsula the following month.

It was redesignated from Army Air Base (AAB) to an Air Force Base (AFB) on 28 March 1948 along with seven other Army Air Bases in Alaska. Its chief assets were a 10,000-foot runway and a deep-water dock. It was controlled by the 5024th Air Base Squadron, Alaskan Air Command (AAC). It was logistically supported by the 39th Air Depot Wing at Elmendorf Air Force Base. Its mission became supporting Military Air Transport Service (MATS) transport flights along the Great Circle Route from Japan, as well as supporting the 7th (later 9th) Weather Group which provided support for WB-29 Superfortress flights of the 58th Weather Reconnaissance Squadron at Eielson AFB which operated over the Northern Pacific and Bering Sea. Both the runway and dock have continued in service to this day serving as transportation hubs for airlines and shipping.

The 5042d ABS was discontinued on 1 January 1950 per AAC General Order Number 198, dated 13 December 1949, due to budget restrictions. Control of the base was taken over directly by AAC. It was planned for inactivation; however, the transport demands by MATS flying to Japan to support the Korean War delayed the inevitable closing of the base until 1 September 1953 by AAC General Order 66.

== Post military use ==
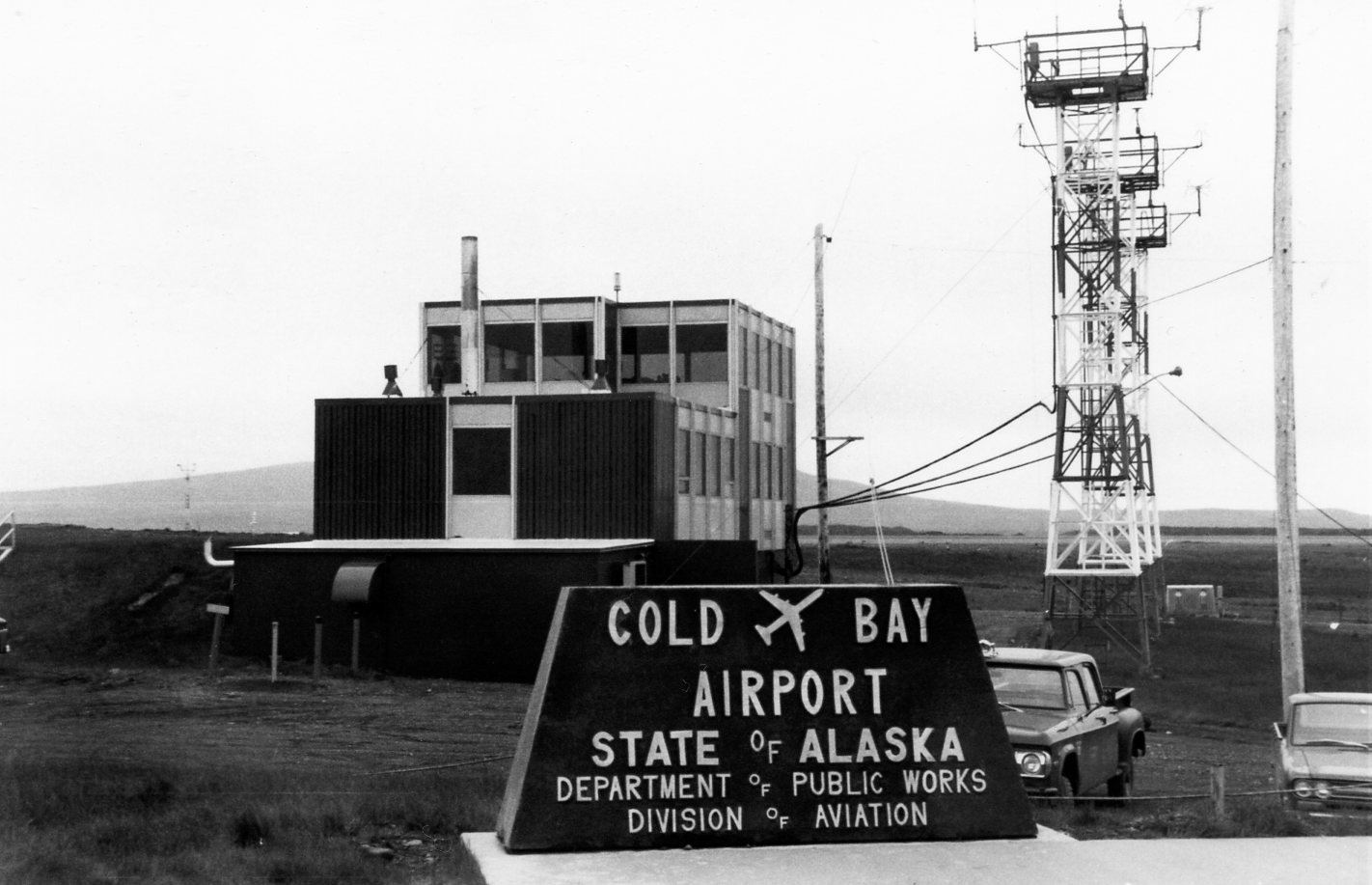
The control tower at Cold Bay airport in August 1972

Following its closure, it was redeveloped into Cold Bay Airport.

Between 1956 and 1958, Cold Bay Airport was used as a logistics support base during the construction of Cold Bay Air Force Station, a Ground Control Intercept (GCI) station for Alaskan Air Command during the Cold War.

The airport is used by the USAF 611th Air Support Group, based at Elmendorf AFB to support the unattended Long Range Radar (LRR) site A-08 just to the northwest of the airport.

== See also ==
- Alaska World War II Army Airfields
- List of former United States Air Force installations
