= Salum Air Base =

Location
- Coordinates: 34°09′54″N 044°44′57″E

Location of Salum Air Base, Iraq

Salum Air Base is a former Iraqi Air Force base in the Diyala Governorate of Iraq. It was captured by Coalition forces during Operation Iraqi Freedom in 2003.

== Overview ==
Salum Air Base was a primary air base for the Iraqi Air Force. At each end of the main 10,000-foot runway are a dozen hardened aircraft shelters known as "Trapezoids" or "Yugos" which were built by Yugoslavian contractors some time prior to 1985 with multiple runways and taxiways, patterned after their Russian counterparts.

The base was heavily attacked by Coalition air power during Operation Desert Storm in January 1991, and abandoned by the Iraqi Air Force after the cease fire in late February. It was seized by Coalition ground forces during Operation Iraqi Freedom in March 2003.

Current aerial imagery shows that the operational structures around the airfield appear to have been demolished and removed. Today the concrete runway and series of taxiways remain exposed and deteriorating to the elements, being reclaimed by the desert.
