= Stallings Air Base =

Former United States Air Force base

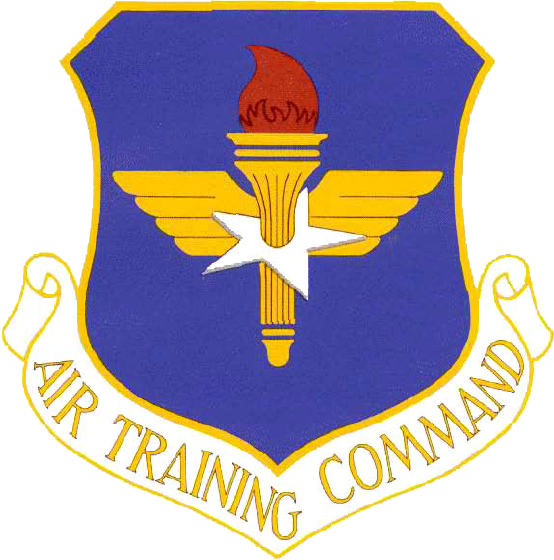
Stallings Air Base
- Part of Air Training Command (ATC)
- Located near: Kinston, North Carolina
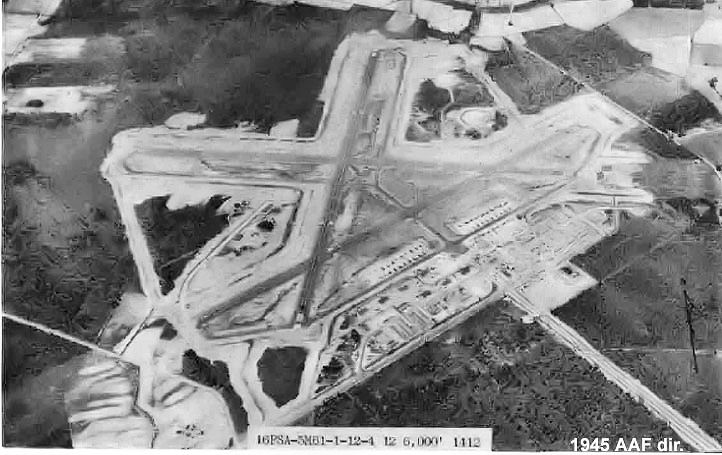
- Marine Corps Auxiliary Airfield Kinston – 1944

Site information
- Type: Air Base
- Controlled by: United States Air Force

Location
- Location of Stallings Air Base, North Carolina
- Coordinates: 35°19′53″N 77°36′32″W

Site history
- Built: 1944
- In use: 1940s–1950s

Stallings Air Base was a United States Air Force base operational from 1944 to 1957. It later reopened as Kinston Airport and is now known as Kinston Regional Jetport.

== History ==
Stallings Air Base originally was built in 1944 by the United States Navy. It opened in October as a United States Marine Corps flying training airfield known as Marine Corps Auxiliary Airfield Kinston, being an auxiliary field to Marine Corps Air Station Cherry Point. Construction involved building runways and several aircraft hangars, with three concrete runways, several taxiways, a large parking apron and a control tower. Buildings were ultimately utilitarian and quickly assembled. Most base buildings, not meant for long-term use, were constructed of temporary or semi-permanent materials. Although some hangars had steel frames and the occasional brick or tile brick building could be seen, most support buildings sat on concrete foundations but were of frame construction clad in little more than plywood and tarpaper.

Naval Aviation Cadets received V-5 flight training along with basic flying indoctrination at the airfield until the facility was closed on 31 October 1945.

As a result of the Cold War and the expansion of the United States Air Force, Kinston Air Base (Note: Air Training Command applied the "Air Base" designation to private contractor-operated flying training bases in continental United States during the 1950s and early 1960s. With the advent of the jet-powered Cessna T-37, Northrop T-38 Talon, and the establishment of the Undergraduate Pilot Training (UPT) system whereby prospective USAF pilots would receive all initial flight training at a single base, the USAF contract flying training program was deemed superfluous. All stateside air bases conducting such contract flying training were phased out and closed by the early 1960s, the facilities transitioning to either auxiliary fields of active air force bases or to civilian airport status.) was reopened on 17 October 1950 by the USAF Air Training Command, as a contract flying training school. The 3308th Flying Training Squadron (Contract Flying) was the operational training unit at the base, with ground and flight training being supplied by the Serv-Air Aviation Corporation. Training at Kinston began on 17 October 1951. In May 1952, Air Training Command renamed Kinston Airfield as Stallings Air Base in memory of Kinston natives Lt Bruce Stallings, a P-51 Mustang pilot killed in March 1945, and his brother, Lt Harry Stallings, a B-29 Superfortress navigator killed in April 1945.

The base conducted flying training and contract flying training initially with Link T-8 and T-18 trainers, later being upgraded to Beechcraft T-34 Mentor and North American T-28 Trojan aircraft. In April 1957, ATC proposed that the contract training at Stallings AB be closed. This recommendation was approved in September and on 1 October flying training ended at Stallings AB. The base was formally inactivated on 27 November 1957.
