= Tikrit East Air Base =

Former Iraqi Air Force base

Location
- Coordinates: 34°36′37″N 043°46′24″E

Location of Tikrit East Air Base, Iraq

Tikrit East Air Base is a former Iraqi Air Force base in the Saladin Governorate of Iraq. It was captured by Coalition forces during Operation Iraqi Freedom in 2003.

== Overview ==
Tikrit East Air Base was an auxiliary air base for the Iraqi Air Force. It had a 9,700 foot runway, a parking ramp and a few support structures. It attacked by Coalition air forces during Operation Iraqi Freedom with numerous bomb craters visible in the main runway. It was abandoned by the Iraqi Air Force after March 2003.

Current aerial imagery shows that the operational structures around the airfield appear to have been demolished and removed. Today the concrete runway and series of taxiways remain exposed and deteriorating to the elements, being reclaimed by the desert.

== See also ==
- Tikrit East Airport
