= Camp Gary =

Former US military installation in Caldwell County, TX

Camp Gary Edward Gary AFB Gary AFB San Marcos AFB San Marcos AAF
- Part of Air Training Command (ATC)
- Located near: San Marcos, Texas
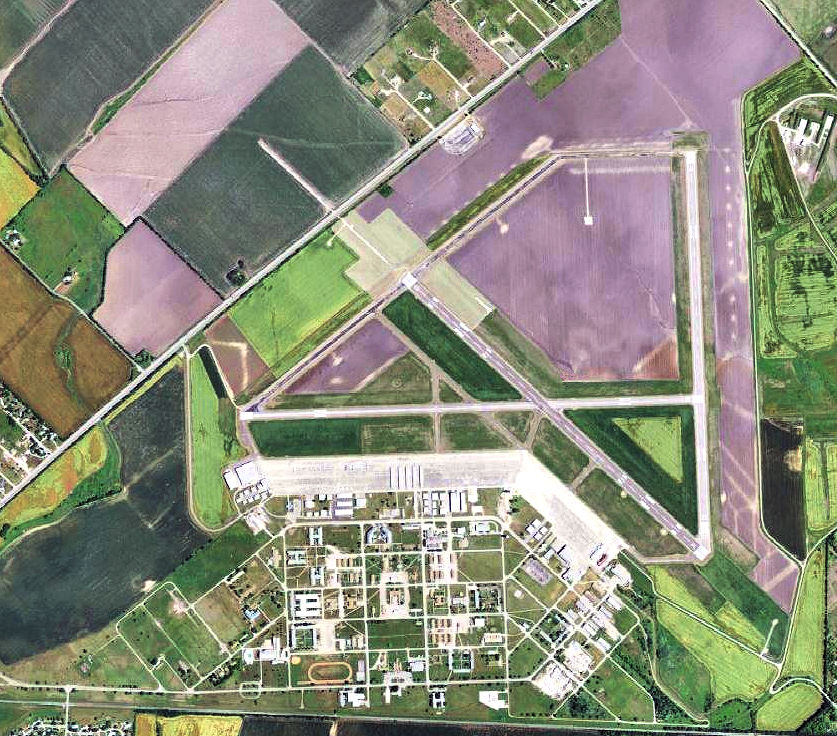
- 2006 USGS airphoto

Site information
- Type: Air Force Base
- Controlled by: United States Air Force

Location
- Coordinates: 29°53′34″N 097°51′47″W

Site history
- Built: 1943
- In use: 1943–1948; 1951–1963

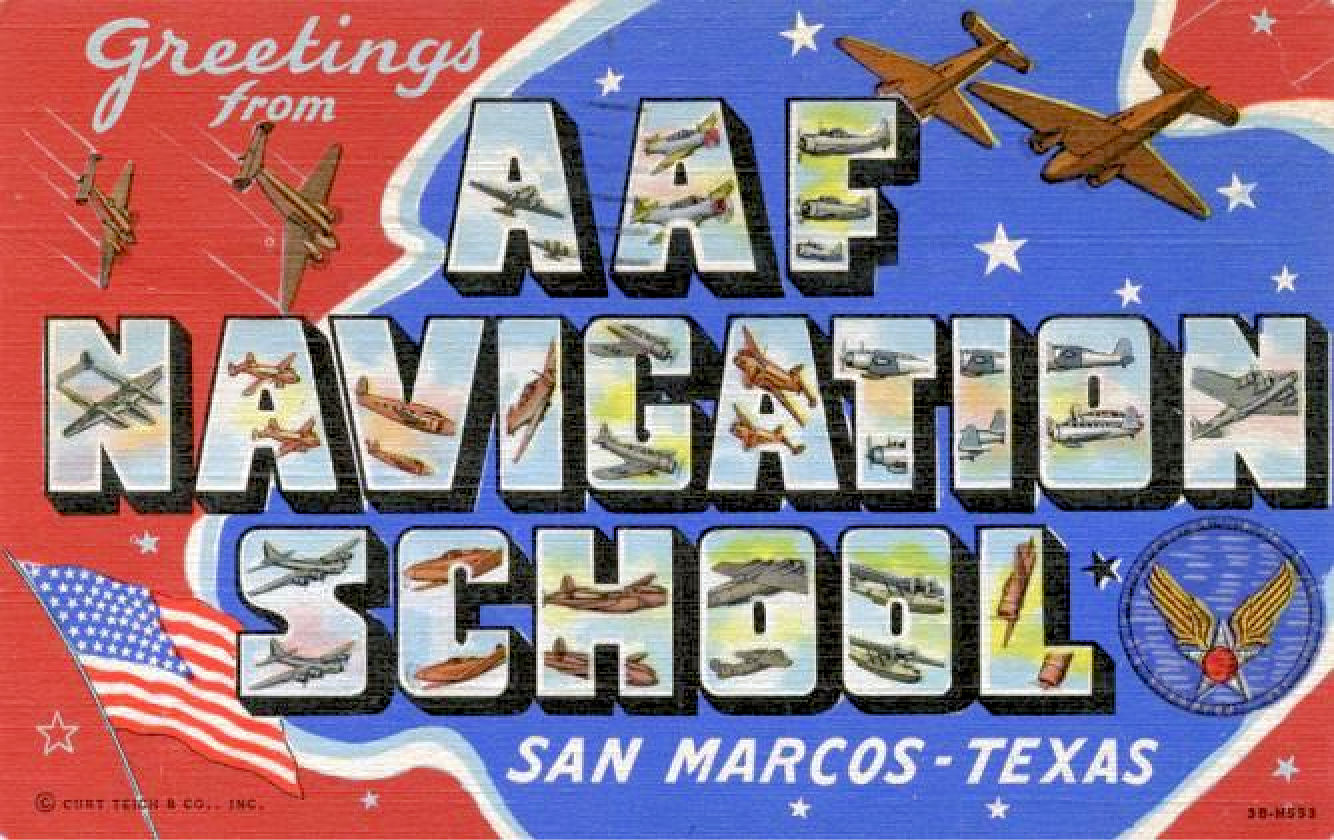
World War II Postcard

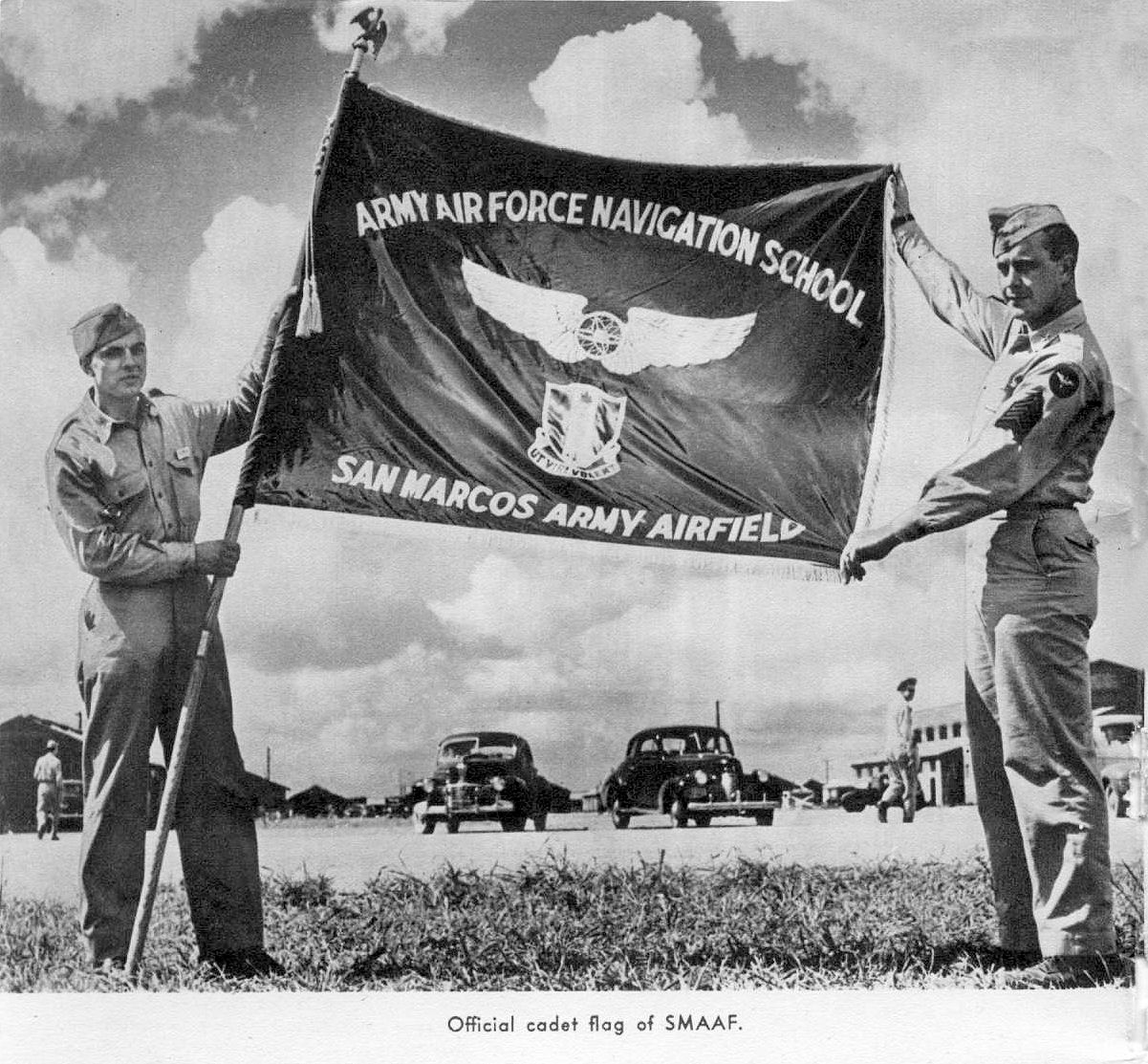
Activation of San Marcos Army Air Field, December 15, 1942.

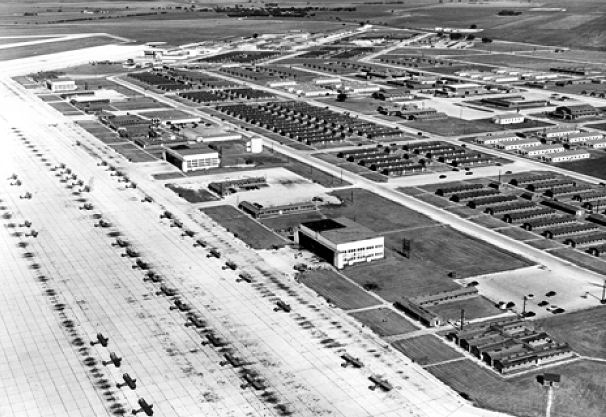
San Marcos Army Air Field, 1946, looking east along the flightline.

Camp Gary (Edward Gary Air Force Base until 15 December 1956) was the United States military installation that was redeveloped into the San Marcos Municipal Airport and the Gary Job Corps Center, the largest in the nation.

== San Marcos Army Air Field ==
San Marcos Army Air Field was a Texas World War II Army airfield. The facility was acquired in June 1942 by the War Department, and site preparation commenced, along with the construction of streets and drainage culverts. The construction cost was about five million dollars. The planned base consisted of administrative buildings, classrooms, barracks, hangars, mess halls, and various recreation facilities. The embryonic army airfield received its first commander in September 1942, when Lieutenant Colonel J. B. Olson was placed in charge of the facility until it was completed.

By the end of November 1942, enough of the basic construction had taken place that the U.S. flag was raised for the first time over the airfield. Lieutenant Colonel J. M. Hutchinson was designated as the new commanding officer at that time. San Marcos Field was officially activated on December 15, 1942. Construction work continued and an administrative staff was assigned by February 1943. The first class of students was formed at the field in late February, and new classes started at the school every three weeks thereafter. Construction of the new base took about a year to complete, and the first class of students for navigator training began in June 1943. The 80th Flying Training Wing (Navigation & Glider) was activated on 25 August 1943.

The navigation school was eighteen weeks long, with each student instructed in four methods of navigation: radio, pilotage, dead reckoning and celestial. During the course of World War II, the navigation school trained about 10,000 students. The school was closed in September 1945 when all USAAF navigator training was consolidated at Ellington Field near Houston; the San Marcos airfield closed at the end of November.

San Marcos Field was reactivated in May 1946 by Army Air Forces Flying Training Command when the USAAF helicopter and liaison school was transferred there from Sheppard Field, near Wichita Falls. The 3585th Pilot Training Wing (Liaison-Helicopter) was activated as the Operational Training Unit on 25 August 1948 until inactivated on 1 March 1949, and helicopter training moved to Waco Air Force Base. San Marcos Field was inactive from 31 March 1949 until 15 January 1951.

== San Marcos Air Force Base ==
San Marcos Air Force Base was designated on 1 February 1951 under Air Training Command when the 3585th Pilot Training Wing and 3586th Tech Tng Sq (Liaison-Helicopter) reactivated for the return of helicopter and liaison flight training (the area had terrain similar to that of Korea.) Helicopter and Liaison mechanics' training also moved to the base from Sheppard AFB, and San Marcos had 5,000 assigned and was the largest helicopter and Liaison training facility in the United States.

== Edward Gary Air Force Base ==
Gary Air Force Base was named on 10 May 1953 for Lieutenant Arthur Edward Gary, the first Hays County, Texas, soldier killed in World War II—and the name was expanded to Edward Gary Air Force Base on 1 September 1955. USAF flying training ended on 14 December 1956.

Camp Gary was the installation name after its transfer to the Department of the Army on 15 December 1956. A civilian contractor trained pilots for fixed wing aircraft until the summer of 1959, and the base was essentially closed in 1963. On 20 November 1964, President Johnson announced that the abandoned Camp Gary would be used as a Job Corps facility.
