= Reese Air Force Base =

Installation in Texas, United States

- Lubbock, Texas in the United States
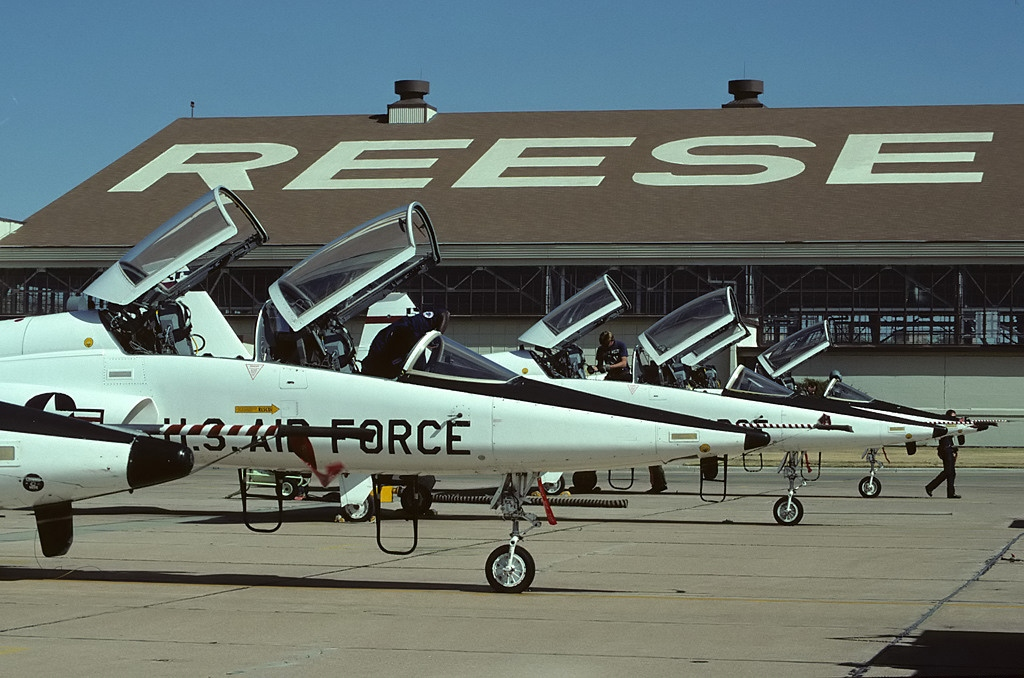
- Northrop T-38A Talons at Reese AFB in 1992

Site information
- Type: US Air Force Base
- Owner: Department of Defense
- Operator: US Air Force
- Controlled by: Air Education and Training Command
- Condition: Closed

Location
- Coordinates: 33°35′47″N 102°02′34″W

Site history
- Built: 1942 (as Lubbock Army Air Corps Advanced Flying School)
- In use: 1942 – 30 September 1997
- Fate: Redeveloped as a research center initially known as the Reese Technology Center and later the Reese National Security Complex

Reese Air Force Base was a former U.S. Army Air Base located near Lubbock, Texas. It was closed in 1997 and its grounds taken over by the Reese Technology Center.

== History ==
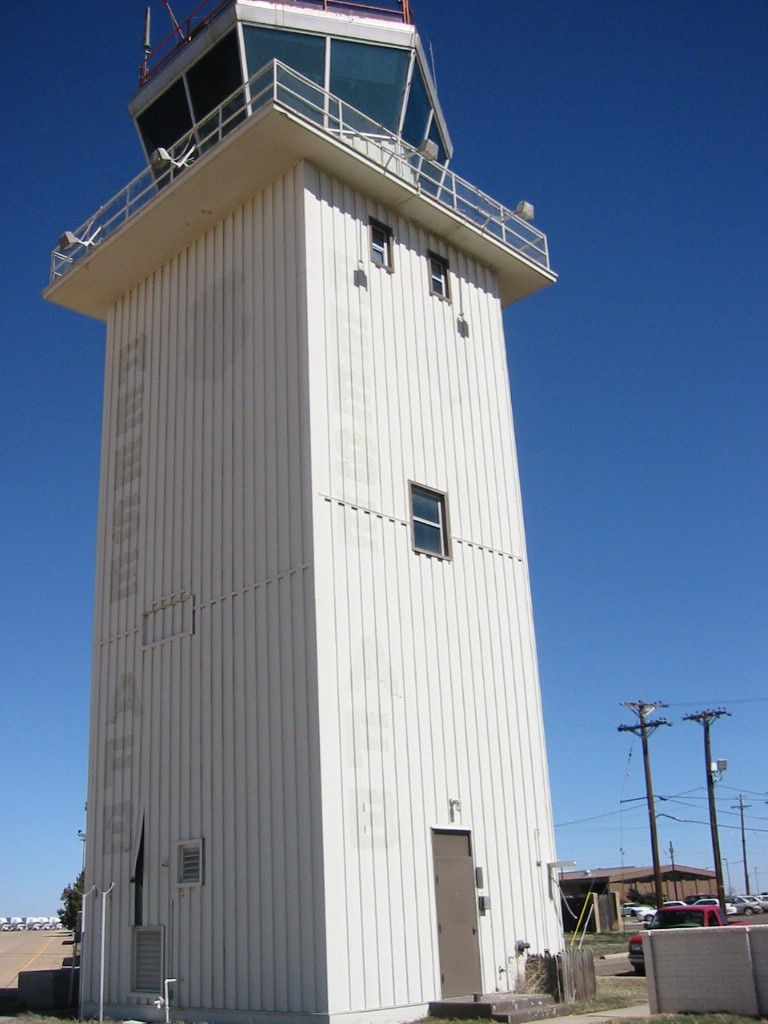
Reese AFB tower

Reese Air Force Base began as the Lubbock Army Air Corps Advanced Flying School in 1942. It was renamed Lubbock Army Flying School in 1943 and then Lubbock Army Airfield later that same year. In 1949, it was renamed Reese Air Force Base in honor of a local West Texas pilot, Augustus F. Reese Jr., who was killed in a bombing raid over Italy during World War II.

Over the years, many milestones were accomplished at Reese Air Force Base, including a special pilot training program, the first flight simulator used in a training program, and a joint pilot training program with the Navy. More than 25,000 pilots, who fought in every conflict since World War II, were trained at Reese.

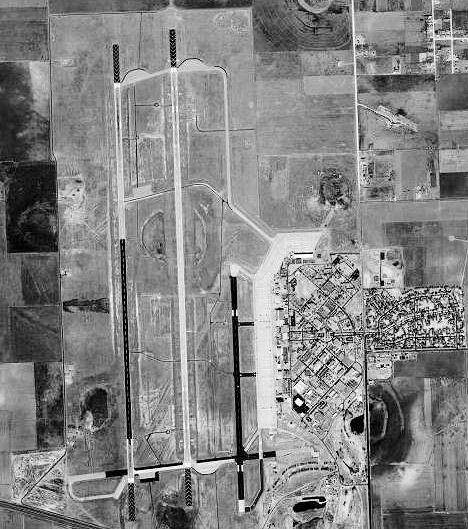
Satellite imagery of Reese AFB taken in 1996

In 1995, word reached the Lubbock community that Reese Air Force Base was on the Pentagon’s list for base closures via the BRAC process. In spite of much opposition from community members and leaders alike, the base closure was announced for September 30, 1997. The Lubbock Reese Redevelopment Committee (LRRC) was created in 1995, just two weeks after the base was recommended to be closed.

The Lubbock Reese Redevelopment Committee was renamed the Redevelopment Authority (LRRA) and could now execute contracts for base property. This committee was composed of local government officials and area businesspeople.

In the years since Reese AFB closure, investigations have occurred to look into the per-and poly-fluoroalkyl substances (PFAS) around the former base. Before Reese Air Force Base closed, it was home to training Air Force Firefighters to extinguish life-threatening fires using foam containing PFAS. After using this substance for many years at the base, it began seeping into the groundwater. The Air Force is continually checking bases for PFAS to this day. Past Reese AFB residents are entitled to compensation if found to the following toxins: Testicular cancer, Renal (kidney) cancer, and Prostate cancer.

== Demographics ==
Historical population
Census	Pop.	Note	%±
1970	2,545		—
1980	1,934		−24.0%
1990	1,263		−34.7%
U.S. Decennial Census; 1960 1970; 1980 1990 2000; 2010

Reese Air Force Base was listed as an unincorporated area in the 1970 U.S. census (pop 2,545); and redesignated as a census designated place in the 1980 United States census. The CDP was deleted prior to the 2000 U.S. census after the air base was closed in 1997; and the Reese Center CDP was formed out of part of its area.

== See also ==
- List of former United States Air Force installations
