= Khan Bani Sad Air Base =

Air base in Iraq

Khan Bani Sad Airbase

Location
- Coordinates: 33°35′29″N 044°35′41″E

Location of Khan Bani Sad Air Base, Iraq

Khan Bani Sad Air Base is a former Iraqi Air Force base in the Diyala Governorate of Iraq. It was captured by Coalition forces during the Iraq War in 2003.

== Overview ==
The facility was a primary air base for the Iraqi Air Force prior to Operation Desert Storm in 1991. In the late 1980s military researchers at the Khan Bani Saad airfield north of Baghdad tested the Zubaidy device, a helicopter-mounted contraption that could disperse bacteriological agents from the air. In the 1990s UN inspectors believed that a dozen Zubaidy devices were built. But the spraying units never were confirmed to have been destroyed.

After the 1991 cease-fire after the Gulf War, the base was officially transferred to the Iraqi Ministry of Agriculture. The Al-Baraj plant at Khan Bani Saad produces alcoholic drinks.

On 1 December 2002 a new contingent of UN inspectors returned to the airfield to search for information about the devices. They spent five hours at the site, inspecting three large camouflage-painted hangars and a collection of Soviet-made helicopters, chemical tanks and spraying nozzles scattered on the tarmac.

On 2 December 2002 inspectors from the International Atomic Energy Agency visited the Awali, Baraj and Dahab companies, which use the nectar of dates to make a potent and popular gin and an anise-flavored spirit called arak that is sold for 75 cents a bottle. The IAEA inspection team went to three small industrial sites, two of which had never been accessed by any inspection teams before. These sites are located approximately 20 km north of Baghdad. Access was granted immediately and inspections were completed as planned, with the cooperation of the Iraqi counterpart. The three sites proved to be dedicated to the production of alcohol.

According to Iraqis, the tanks, nozzles and helicopters are used to spray pesticides on crops. The helicopters fly to farms, where the side-mounted tanks are filled before pilots commence spraying operations. The facility has about 25 aging Soviet Mi-2 helicopters, but only about nine work.

The facility was seized in 2003 by coalition military forces during the Iraq War. Today the airfield is abandoned, with a few small buildings in use.
