= Al Muhammadi Air Base =

Site information
- Condition: abandoned

Location
- Coordinates: 33°26′45″N 042°54′11″E

Site history
- Demolished: partially

Location of Al Muhammadi Air Base, Iraq

Al Muhammadi Air Base is a former Iraqi Air Force base in the Al-Anbar Governorate of Iraq. It was seized by Coalition forces during Operation Iraqi Freedom in 2003.

== Overview ==
Al Muhammadi was primarily a ground military facility for the Iraqi Army prior to Operation Iraqi Freedom (OIF). Two large military areas can be seen in aerial imagery to the west and south of the airfield. The airfield, classified by the IATA as a small civilian airport, consists of a 10,000-foot runway with several hardened military aircraft shelters knowns as "Trapezoids" or "Yugos" which were built by Yugoslavian contractors some time prior to 1985.

The base was heavily attacked by Coalition airpower during OIF; aerial imagery shows numerous bomb craters scattered throughout the airfield area, with the army facilities having large numbers of damaged, roofless buildings.

Operational structures around the airfield appear to have been demolished and removed. Today the concrete runway and series of taxiways remain exposed and deteriorating to the elements.
