= Al-Iskandariyah New Air Base =

Al-Iskandariyah New Air Base Camp/FLB Dogwood FOB Chosin

Site information
- Condition: abandoned

Location
- Coordinates: 32°57′55″N 044°16′44″E

Site history
- Demolished: partially

Location of Al-Iskandariyah New Air Base, Iraq

Al-Iskandariyah New Air Base is a former Iraqi Air Force base in the Babil Governorate of Iraq. It was seized by invading U.S. forces during Operation Iraqi Freedom in 2003.

== Overview ==
The Al Iskandariyah (Alexandria) airfield was said by some sources to be one of eight major Iraqi Air Force bases in 1991. It was a large and expansive facility containing several hundred buildings and an extensive number of protective berms for aircraft revetments, maintenance shops and hangars, anti-aircraft missile sites and weapons storage areas. It was attacked during Operation Desert Storm. The al-Quds General Company for Mechanical Industries was a large military industrial factory. In 2001, the Iraqi government explored the possibility of establishing a joint Iraqi-Belarusian tractor factory on the site.

Today the facility is abandoned. Many support structures remain standing and abandoned, deteriorating in the elements. Operational hardened aircraft shelters and other structures around the airfield appear to have been demolished or removed. Today the concrete runway and series of taxiways remain exposed.

== See also ==
- FOB Chosin
