= Adak =

Adak may refer to:

== Places ==
- Adak Island, one of the Aleutian Islands
  - Adak, Alaska, a town on the above island
  - Adak Airport, airport serving the town
    - Adak Army Airfield, original name of the airport (1942–c.1943)
    - Davis Army Airfield, a later name of the airport (c.1943–1950)
    - Naval Air Facility Adak, a later name of the airport (1950–1997)
  - Adak Region School District serving the town
- Adak, Sweden, a locality and small town in Västerbotten, Sweden
- Adak, Kemaliye, a village

== People ==
- Runggye Adak, Tibetan activist
- Subrata Adak, Indian biochemist
- Ramdas Adak, 17th-century Bengali poet and author

== Other uses ==
- Adak (album), an album by İzel
- Adak Fisheries, the exclusive fisheries operator at Adak Island
- America/Adak or Adak timezone; a time zone in Alaska
- USCGC Adak (WPB-1333), a U.S. Coast Guard cutter
