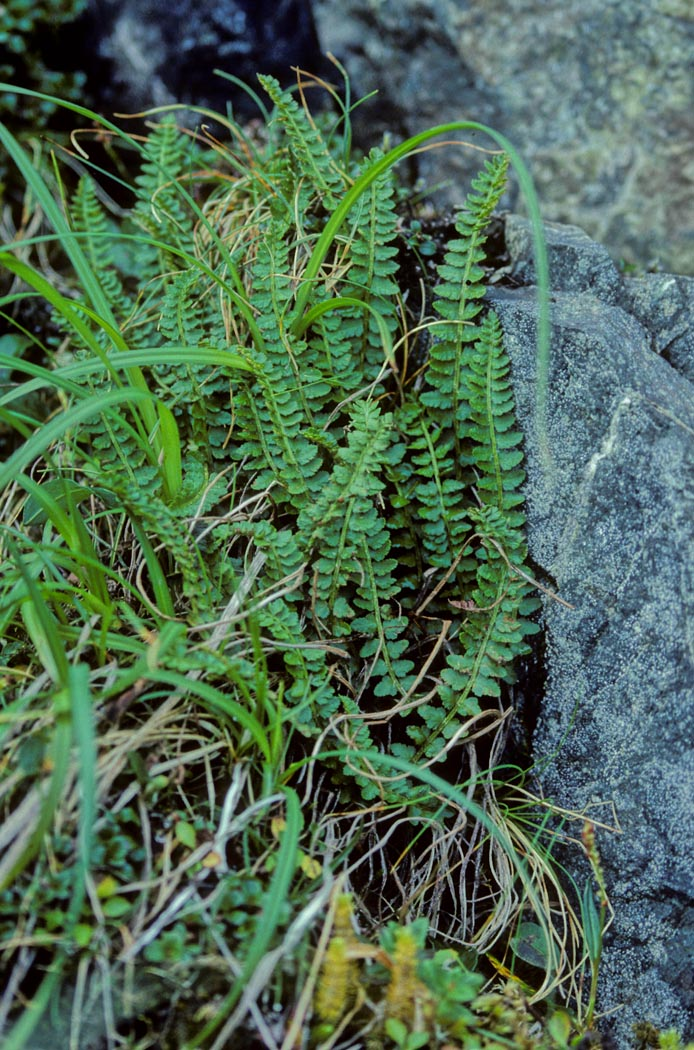

Conservation status
- Critically Imperiled (NatureServe)

Scientific classification
- Kingdom: Plantae
- Clade: Tracheophytes
- Division: Polypodiophyta
- Class: Polypodiopsida
- Order: Polypodiales
- Suborder: Polypodiineae
- Family: Dryopteridaceae
- Genus: Polystichum
- Species: P. aleuticum

Binomial name
- Polystichum aleuticum C. Christens.

= Polystichum aleuticum =

Species of fern

Polystichum aleuticum, the Aleutian holly fern or Aleutian shield fern, is an endangered species of the Polystichum genus and currently consisting of a small, vulnerable population endemic found only on Adak Island, Alaska, a remote island of the Aleutian Islands chain in the northern Pacific Ocean. This species grows on steep, windswept slopes with thin, rocky soils, often in sites exposed to salt spray and harsh subarctic weather, conditions that likely contribute to its limited distribution. In 1992, 112 specimens existed in the wild, and following its listing as endangered in 1988, a recovery plan was implemented. The U.S. Fish and Wildlife Service developed a recovery plan outlining habitat protection, population monitoring, and research on the species’ biology. Periodic 5-year reviews have continued to evaluate population trends and management needs. The Aleutian shield fern is the only native plant of Alaska on the federal endangered species list. As there are fewer than 150 plants known to exist, it is a very rare North American plant making it an important focus of botanical conservation in the state. Major threats include landslides, harsh storms, and trampling by wildlife, and its tiny range makes the remaining populations especially vulnerable to chance events. Polystichum aleuticum was first described in 1938, but it could not be located again until 1975 when a group was identified on Mount Reed on Adak Island. A second, third, and fourth population, all on Mount Reed, were located in 1988, 1993, and 1999, respectively. Searches on other Aleutian Islands since 1988 have failed to identify additional populations.

== Distribution and Habitat ==
Polystichum aleuticum is confined to a single location on Mount Reed on Adak Island in the central Aleutians. It grows tucked into moist rock crevices and beneath small overhangs on steep, northeast-facing slopes between roughly 338 and 525 meters in elevation. The species’ compact, tufted form and its small, sharply toothed pinnae are thought to suit the thin soils, strong winds, persistent moisture, and cold, unstable conditions characteristic of this subarctic mountain environment. It is unlike any other known shield fern found in North America, and originally it was questioned whether it even belonged to the genus Polystichum. However, it was found to be similar to a dwarf Polystichum species native to southwestern mountains of China and the Himalayas.

== Description ==
Polystichum aleuticum is a small, erect fern that reaches about 15 cm (roughly six inches) in height. It typically grows as solitary individuals rather than in clusters. The plant has a short, dark, fibrous root system with old leaf bases still attached. During the growing season, the fronds appear light to dark olive green and taper toward the tip. Each frond carries 15–25 pairs of small, toothed pinnae that are either sessile or on short stalks, usually 4–8 mm (0.16–0.31 in) long. The stipe bases are chestnut brown and covered with fine, straw-colored scales that also extend onto the undersides of the pinnae. Sori appear on the upper leaflets in July and August, usually one per leaflet (sometimes two), arranged in two central rows. Each sorus is protected by an indusium, a thin flap of tissue. These sori form 6–8 small patches on the underside of each fertile leaflet.

=== Leaves ===
Polystichum aleuticum produces fronds approximately 15 cm (5.9 in) long that taper toward both the base and apex. The fronds emerge only during the growing season and sometimes do not unfurl until late summer The stipe bases are chestnut brown, and delicate, straw colored scales cover both the stipe and the undersides of the pinnae. Each frond bears roughly 15–25 pairs of pinnae, typically 4–8 mm (0.16–0.31 in) long, with small toothed margins. The spore masses (sori) appear in 6–8 clustered patches arranged in two median rows on the underside of leaf segments and are protected by an indusium.

=== Roots ===
Polystichum aleuticum grows from a short, dark rhizome that anchors it tightly into the rocky crevices of Mount Reed. The rhizome is covered with brown scales and old frond bases, giving it a rough, layered look similar to the stipe bases described for the species. From this rhizome, the fern sends out a dense, fibrous root system that helps it grip steep slopes and hold moisture in thin, unstable soils conditions typical of its harsh subarctic habitat.

== Reproduction ==
Like other ferns, Polystichum aleuticum follows the typical fern life cycle, alternating between a spore bearing sporophyte and a gametophyte stage. Studies conducted in the 1990s confirmed its spores are viable, germination tests documented prothallia formation, followed by development of gametophytes and subsequent sporophytes. At the peak of greenhouse cultivation, over 1,000 mature sporophytes were successfully grown from spores. However, maintaining these greenhouse populations was challenging; by the end of the cultivation effort, fewer than 50 sporophytes remained and none developed fertile, spore bearing fronds.

== Conservation ==
NatureServe lists the species as Critically Imperiled due to its extremely limited range and tiny population. Conservation work has centered on protecting the known habitat, monitoring the few existing plants, and reducing disturbances from people and wildlife. Because so few individuals exist on a single exposed slope, the fern remains at risk from unpredictable events like landslides, heavy storms, or accidental trampling
