= Aleutian Region School District =

School district in Alaska, United States

Address
- 118 East International Airport Road Anchorage, Alaska, 99518; United States

District information
- Type: Public
- Grades: K–12
- NCES District ID: 0200010

Students and staff
- Students: 21
- Teachers: 3.0
- Staff: 2.56
- Student–teacher ratio: 7.00

Other information
- Website: www.aleutregion.org

Aleutian Region School District (ARSD; REAA #8) is a school district headquartered in Anchorage, Alaska. It serves the Aleutian Islands west of Unalaska, including Adak, Atka, and Nikolski. ARSD is the school district in the United States that is both the farthest east and the farthest west. Several uninhabited islands, including Attu and Shemya, are within the district's physical boundaries.

== History ==
Previously areas of the Unorganized Borough were served by schools directly operated by the Alaska Department of Education and by Bureau of Indian Affairs (BIA) schools. This included all areas of the Aleutian Islands not located in any city. The state schools were transferred to the Alaska State-Operated School System (SOS) after the Alaska Legislature created it in 1971; that agency was terminated in 1975, with its schools transferred to the newly created Alaska Unorganized Borough School District, which was broken apart into twenty-one school districts the following year. At that time the Alaska Legislature created the ARSD.

Previously the district's mailing address was to Unalaska, where its headquarters was designated. Aleutian Region had been contracting administrative services from the Unalaska City School District, using the superintendent as its superintendent. Around 1999 the Anchorage company Education Resources Inc. began providing administrative services to Aleutian Region; the district switched because Unalaska City decided to not continue providing administrative services to Aleutian Region.

== Schools ==
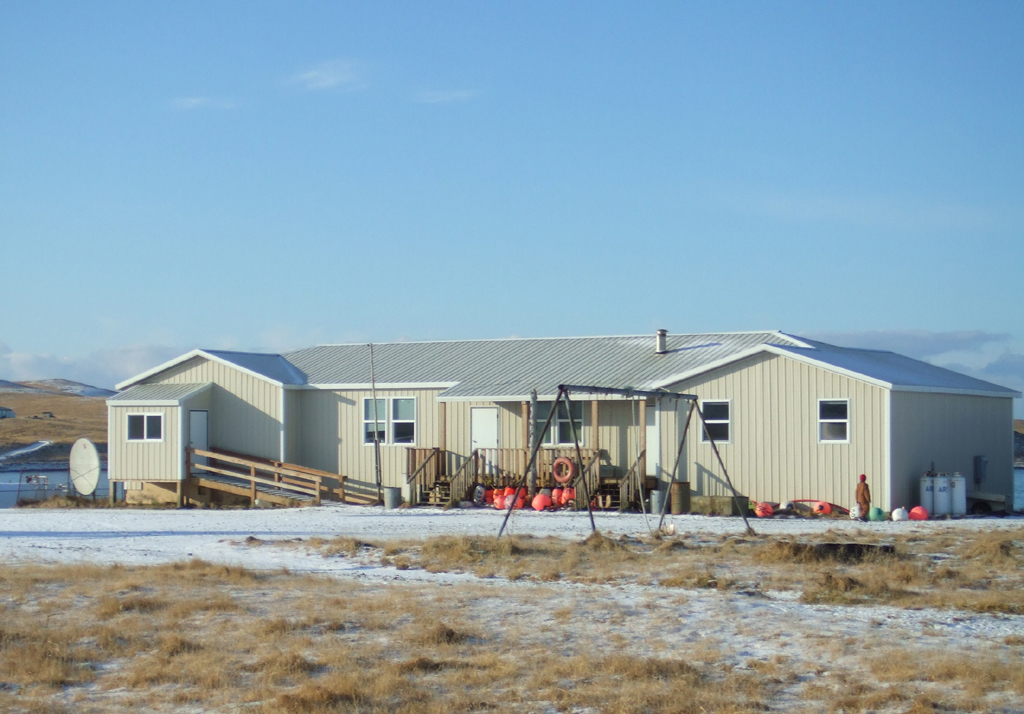
Nikolski School

The district now only operates two schools, Yakov E. Netsvetov School in Atka and the Nikolski School.

The Nikolski School was constructed in 1939 by the Bureau of Indian Affairs. Schools in rural Alaska must have at least 10 students to retain funding from the state. For the 2009–2010 school year, however, Nikolski School had only nine students. This threatened the school's existence, and it closed after the conclusion of the 2009–2010 school year. The school reopened in 2024.

Adak was served by the Adak Region School District until it closed in June 1996. The ARSD later opened a school in Adak, and it closed on June 30, 2023 due to failing to meet the threshold number of students.

The district previously operated schools in Akutan, Cold Bay, False Pass, Nelson Lagoon, Sand Point, and Squaw Harbor. Several of these areas are now a part of the Aleutians East Borough School District.

== Demographics ==
In 2014 the Adak School had 25 students.

In 1999 the district had 50 students in three schools.

Circa October 1978 the district had 252 students. At the time the Akutan School had 12 students, the Atka School had 22 students, the Cold Bay school had 37 students, the False Pass school had 8 students, the Nelson Lagoon school had 18 students, the Nikolski school had 15 students, the Sand Point school had 136 students, and the Squaw Valley School had 4 students.

Circa October 1978 the district had three teachers/specialists who rotated through very rural islands. That year Sand Point school itself had 13 teachers. There were two teachers each at the schools in Atka, Cold Bay, and Nelson Lagoon. The others each had a single teacher.
