= Adak, Alaska =

City in Alaska, United States

- City
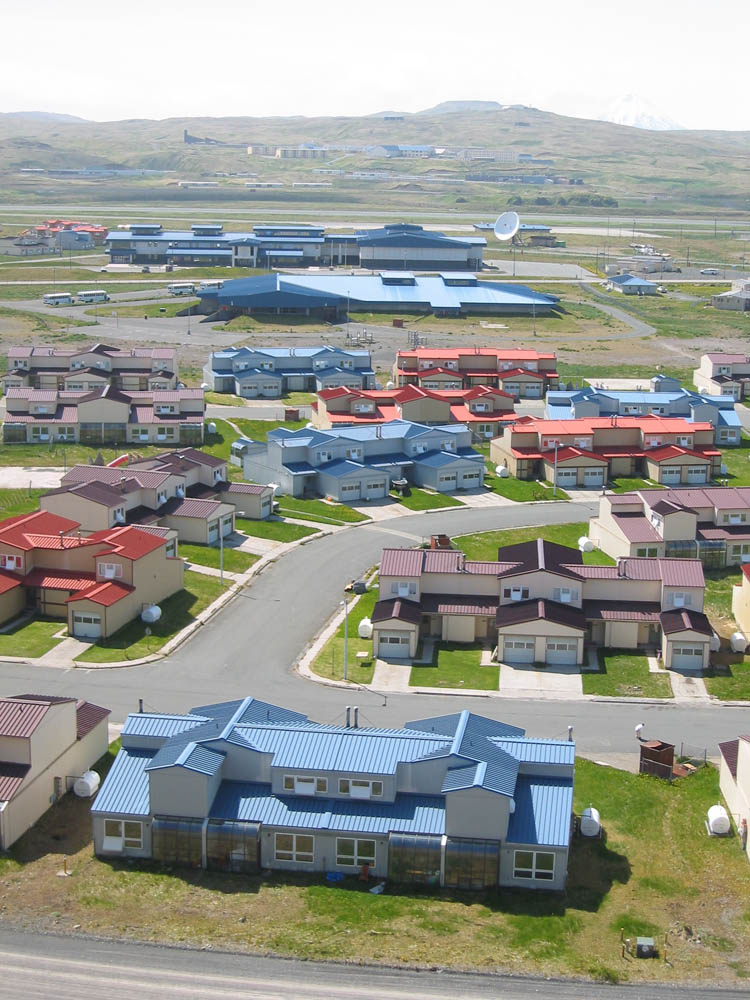
- Adak in 2006

- Location in Alaska
- Coordinates: 51°52′41″N 176°38′46″W
- Country: United States
- State: Alaska
- Census Area: Aleutians West
- Incorporated: 2001

Government
  - Mayor: Terri Douglas
  - State senator: Lyman Hoffman (D)
  - State rep.: Bryce Edgmon (I)

Area
  - Total: 71.47 sq mi (185.10 km^{2})
  - Land: 32.43 sq mi (84.00 km^{2})
  - Water: 39.03 sq mi (101.10 km^{2})
- Elevation: 164 ft (50 m)

Population (2020)
  - Total: 171
  - Density: 5.3/sq mi (2.04/km^{2})
- Time zone: UTC−10 (Hawaii-Aleutian (HST))
  - Summer (DST): UTC−9 (HDT)
- ZIP Code: 99546
- Area code: 907
- FIPS code: 02-00065
- GNIS feature ID: 1418109
- Website: adak-ak.gov

Adak (/ˈeɪ.dæk/, AY-dack; Aleut: Adaax, pronounced [ˈaðɑχ]), formerly Adak Station, is a city located on Adak Island, in the Aleutians West Census Area, Alaska, United States. At the 2020 census, the population was 171, down from 326 in 2010. It is the westernmost municipality in the United States and the southernmost city in Alaska. (Note: Attu Station, Alaska, is further west in the Aleutian Islands, but is not incorporated and, as it lies west of the 180th meridian, may be considered the second easternmost place instead.) (See Extreme points of the United States.) The city is the former location of the Naval Air Facility Adak, NAVFAC Adak.

== History ==
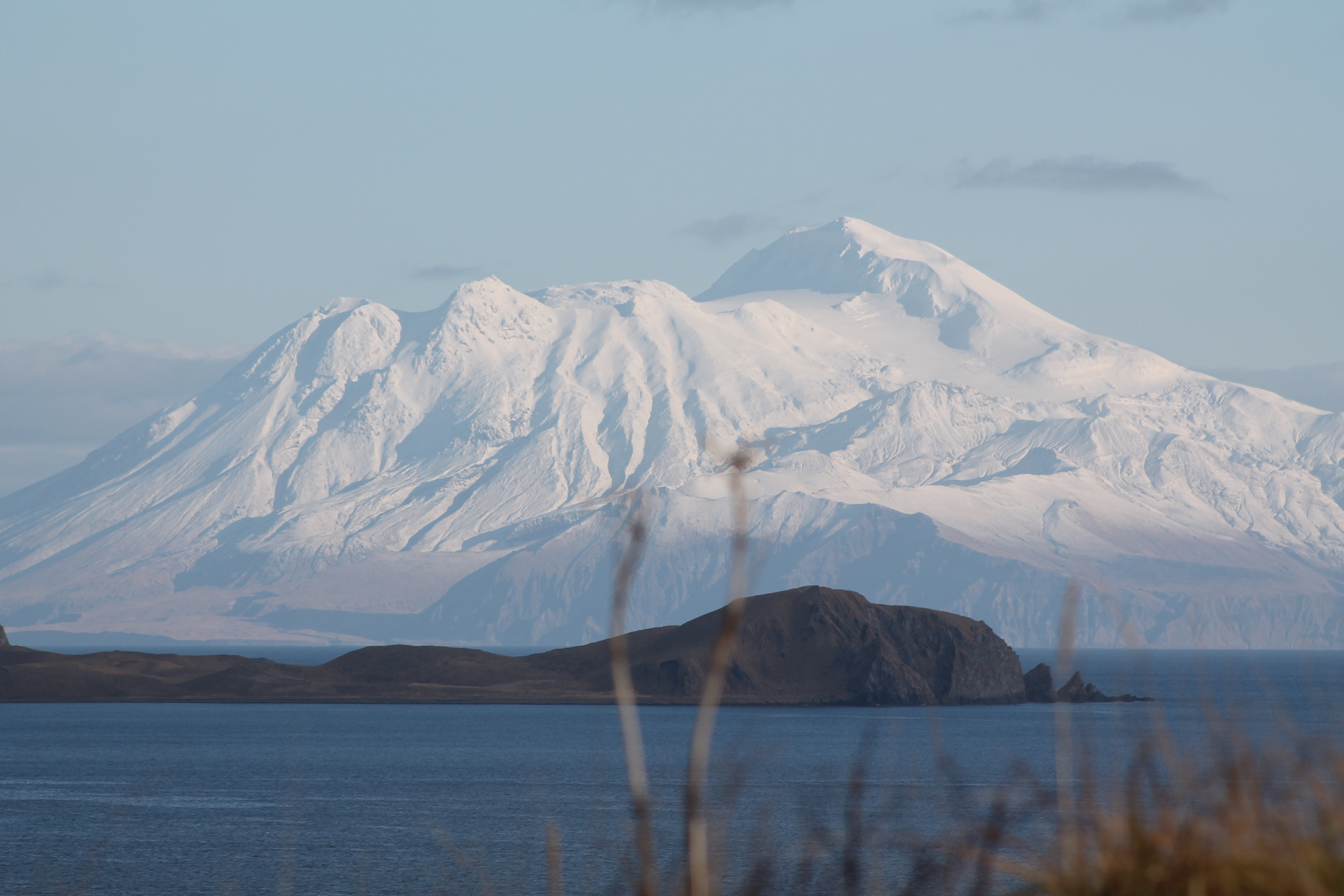
Great Sitkin Island view with telephoto from Adak, AK

=== 19th century ===
The Aleutian Islands were historically occupied by the Unanga, more commonly known now as the Aleuts. The once heavily populated island was eventually abandoned in the early 19th century as the Aleutian Island hunters followed the Russian fur trade eastward, and famine set in on the Andreanof Island group. However, they continued to hunt and fish actively around the island over the years, until World War II broke out.

=== Military ===
Adak Army installations allowed U.S. and Canadian forces to mount a successful offensive against the Japanese-held islands of Kiska and Attu. After the war, Adak was developed as a naval air station, playing an important role during the Cold War as a submarine surveillance center. Large earthquakes rocked the island in 1957, 1964 and 1977.

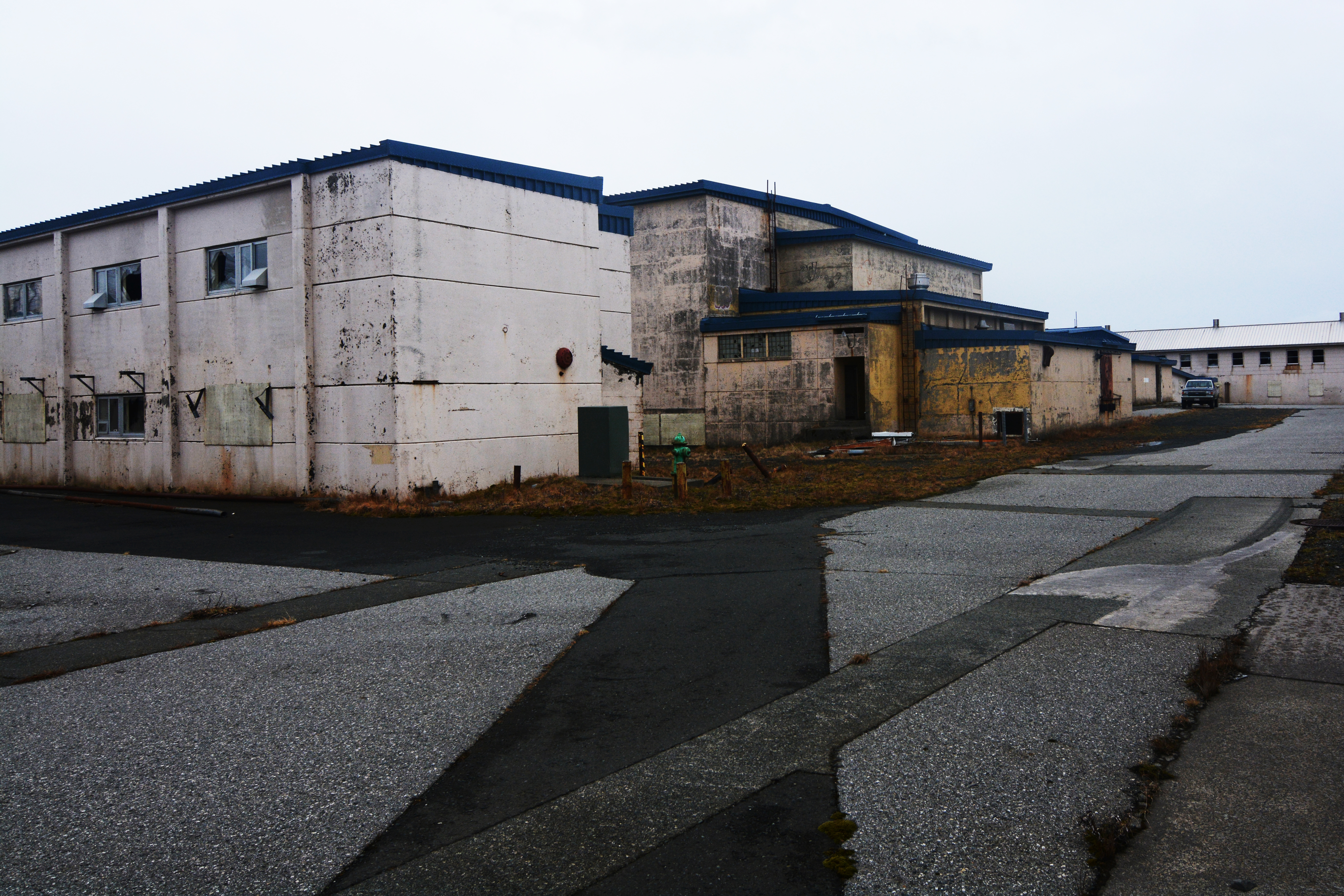
Abandoned military buildings on Adak Island. These buildings house a basketball court, squash court, saunas, bowling alley, and more; currently, they all are in an unusable state of disrepair.

At its peak, the station housed over 6,000 naval and Coast Guard personnel and their families. In 1994, the base was downsized; the local McDonald's and both the family housing and schools were closed. The station officially closed on March 31, 1997, as a result of 1995 Base Realignment and Closure Commission (BRAC). The Aleut Corporation purchased Adak's facilities under a land transfer agreement with the Department of the Interior and the U.S. Navy/Department of Defense. This agreement was finalized in March 2004. About 30 families with children relocated to Adak in September 1998, most of them Aleut Corp. shareholders, and the former high school was reopened at that time as a K–12 institution. The community incorporated as a second-class city in April 2001. Substantially all of the infrastructure and facilities on Adak are owned by Aleut Corporation, which is currently developing Adak as a commercial center via their subsidiary companies. For example, properties in active use are leased by Adak Commercial Properties, LLC.

Since World War II, the U.S. Navy and Coast Guard developed facilities and recreation opportunities at Adak. At its peak, Adak had a college, a McDonald's restaurant, a Baskin-Robbins ice cream stand, movie theater, roller skating rink, swimming pool, ski lodge, bowling alleys, skeet range, auto hobby shop, photo lab, and racquetball & tennis courts. A new $18-million hospital was built in 1990, just seven years prior to the closure of the station. By March 2003, six years after the closure of the station, most of these facilities had closed.

As of March 2021 and continuing into 2026, the U.S. Navy is considering reopening the air base at Adak.

== Geography ==
Adak is located on Kuluk Bay, on Adak Island, in the Andreanof Islands group of the Aleutian Islands Recording District, and in the 3rd Judicial District. It lies 1,200 miles (1,930 km) southwest of Anchorage and 450 miles (724 km) west of Dutch Harbor at 51.872° North, 176.636° West (Sec. 10, T096S, R195W, Seward Meridian), near the Russian end of the arc that makes up this volcanic island chain. Flight time to Anchorage is three hours or longer, depending on weather. Adak is the southernmost community in Alaska and on the same latitude as Haida Gwaii in Canada, and London, England. It is less than three degrees of latitude north of the 49th parallel, which forms the western part of the land border between the Contiguous United States and Canada.

According to the U.S. Census Bureau, the city has a total area of 127.3 square miles (330 km^{2}), of which 122.4 square miles (317 km^{2}) is land and 4.9 square miles (13 km^{2}) (3.87%) is water.

=== Climate ===
Adak has a subpolar oceanic climate (Cfc), characterized by persistently overcast skies, moderate temperatures, high winds, significant precipitation, and frequent cyclonic storms. Winter squalls produce wind gusts in excess of 100 knots (120 mph; 190 km/h). During the summer, extensive fog forms over the Bering Sea and North Pacific. Average temperatures range from 20 to 60 °F (−7 to 16 °C), but wind chill factors can be severe. Average annual precipitation is 65.6 inches (1,670 mm) annually, concentrated markedly in fall and winter. December is the wettest single month on average, while June and July are markedly the driest months, with thunderstorms virtually unknown here. Snowfall averages nearly 100 inches (250 cm) per winter season, which however tends to melt soon after falling. With 263 rainy days per year, Adak has the second highest number of any inhabited locality in the United States after Hilo, Hawaii.

Climate data for Adak, Alaska (1981–2010 normals, extremes 1942–present)
Month	Jan	Feb	Mar	Apr	May	Jun	Jul	Aug	Sep	Oct	Nov	Dec	Year
Record high °F (°C)	52 (11)	54 (12)	57 (14)	56 (13)	65 (18)	67 (19)	73 (23)	75 (24)	71 (22)	63 (17)	63 (17)	55 (13)	75 (24)
Mean maximum °F (°C)	44.4 (6.9)	45.2 (7.3)	45.8 (7.7)	48.9 (9.4)	52.1 (11.2)	56.8 (13.8)	64.8 (18.2)	67.6 (19.8)	60.6 (15.9)	55.0 (12.8)	49.5 (9.7)	46.5 (8.1)	69.1 (20.6)
Mean daily maximum °F (°C)	37.3 (2.9)	38.0 (3.3)	39.4 (4.1)	42.0 (5.6)	45.8 (7.7)	49.8 (9.9)	54.6 (12.6)	57.2 (14.0)	53.1 (11.7)	48.5 (9.2)	42.8 (6.0)	38.9 (3.8)	45.6 (7.6)
Daily mean °F (°C)	32.7 (0.4)	33.5 (0.8)	35.0 (1.7)	37.6 (3.1)	41.4 (5.2)	45.5 (7.5)	50.0 (10.0)	52.0 (11.1)	48.5 (9.2)	43.7 (6.5)	38.1 (3.4)	34.3 (1.3)	41.0 (5.0)
Mean daily minimum °F (°C)	28.0 (−2.2)	29.0 (−1.7)	30.6 (−0.8)	33.1 (0.6)	37.0 (2.8)	41.2 (5.1)	45.3 (7.4)	46.9 (8.3)	43.9 (6.6)	39.0 (3.9)	33.4 (0.8)	29.6 (−1.3)	36.4 (2.4)
Mean minimum °F (°C)	12.9 (−10.6)	17.4 (−8.1)	19.9 (−6.7)	25.8 (−3.4)	30.8 (−0.7)	35.8 (2.1)	40.2 (4.6)	40.0 (4.4)	34.2 (1.2)	29.8 (−1.2)	24.9 (−3.9)	18.1 (−7.7)	10.6 (−11.9)
Record low °F (°C)	3 (−16)	3 (−16)	11 (−12)	20 (−7)	20 (−7)	29 (−2)	33 (1)	33 (1)	28 (−2)	22 (−6)	12 (−11)	8 (−13)	3 (−16)
Average precipitation inches (mm)	6.09 (155)	4.05 (103)	4.98 (126)	3.14 (80)	2.87 (73)	2.79 (71)	2.63 (67)	4.22 (107)	5.48 (139)	6.19 (157)	6.30 (160)	5.96 (151)	54.70 (1,389)
Average snowfall inches (cm)	24.8 (63)	17.3 (44)	19.3 (49)	7.7 (20)	1.3 (3.3)	0.0 (0.0)	0.0 (0.0)	0.0 (0.0)	trace	0.6 (1.5)	10.8 (27)	20.6 (52)	102.4 (260)
Average precipitation days (≥ 0.01 inch)	25.7	22.3	25.4	21.6	22.3	16.4	15.5	19.4	21.6	24.9	24.4	26.8	266.3
Average snowy days (≥ 0.1 in)	18.2	15.4	16.4	11.6	2.6	0.0	0.0	0.0	0.1	1.0	10.0	15.9	91.2
Source 1: NOAA
Source 2: XMACIS2 (mean maxima/minima 1981–2010), WRCC (extremes)

== Demographics ==
Historical population
Census	Pop.	Note	%±
1970	2,249		—
1980	3,315		47.4%
1990	4,633		39.8%
2000	316		−93.2%
2010	326		3.2%
2020	171		−47.5%
2022 (est.)	158	▼	−7.6%
U.S. Decennial Census

Adak first appeared on the 2000 U.S. Census as a census-designated place (CDP), although it previously was the Adak Naval Station from 1970 to 1990. In 2001, it formally incorporated as a city.

=== Racial and ethnic composition ===
Adak city, Alaska – Racial and ethnic composition Note: the US Census treats Hispanic/Latino as an ethnic category. This table excludes Latinos from the racial categories and assigns them to a separate category. Hispanics/Latinos may be of any race.
Race / Ethnicity (NH = Non-Hispanic)	Pop 2000	Pop 2010	Pop 2020	% 2000	% 2010	% 2020
White alone (NH)	144	59	58	45.47%	18.10%	33.92%
Black or African American alone (NH)	4	13	10	1.27%	3.99%	5.85%
Native American or Alaska Native alone (NH)	109	18	32	34.49%	5.52%	18.71%
Asian alone (NH)	31	171	7	9.81%	52.45%	4.09%
Native Hawaiian or Pacific Islander alone (NH)	5	5	7	1.58%	1.53%	4.09%
Other race alone (NH)	0	0	0	0.00%	0.00%	0.00%
Mixed race or Multiracial (NH)	7	31	19	2.22%	9.51%	11.11%
Hispanic or Latino (any race)	16	29	38	5.06%	8.90%	22.22%
Total	316	326	171	100.00%	100.00%	100.00%

=== 2020 census ===
As of the 2020 census, Adak had a population of 171. The median age was 38.8 years. 12.9% of residents were under the age of 18 and 8.8% of residents were 65 years of age or older. For every 100 females there were 137.5 males, and for every 100 females age 18 and over there were 125.8 males age 18 and over. The Asian population decreased to 7 of 171 residents.

There were 62 households in Adak, of which 45.2% had children under the age of 18 living in them. Of all households, 25.8% were married-couple households, 38.7% were households with a male householder and no spouse or partner present, and 24.2% were households with a female householder and no spouse or partner present. About 24.2% of all households were made up of individuals and 1.6% had someone living alone who was 65 years of age or older. The population is entirely rural.

There were 244 housing units, of which 74.6% were vacant. The homeowner vacancy rate was 0.0% and the rental vacancy rate was 78.8%.

Racial composition as of the 2020 census
Race	Number	Percent
White	61	35.7%
Black or African American	11	6.4%
American Indian and Alaska Native	38	22.2%
Asian	7	4.1%
Native Hawaiian and Other Pacific Islander	8	4.7%
Some other race	19	11.1%
Two or more races	27	15.8%
Hispanic or Latino (of any race)	38	22.2%

=== 2010 census ===
As of the 2010 census, Adak was the only city in Alaska to have a majority Asian population (171 of 326 residents). Akutan and Kodiak have Asian pluralities.

=== 2000 census ===
As of the census of 2000, there were 316 people, 159 households, and 61 families residing in the city. The population density was 2.6 people per square mile (1.0 people/km^{2}). There were 884 housing units at an average density of 7.2 units per square mile (2.8 units/km^{2}). The racial makeup of the city was 49.68% White, 1.27% Black or African American, 35.13% Native American, 9.81% Asian, 1.90% Pacific Islander, and 2.22% from two or more races. Of the population, 5.06% were Hispanic or Latino of any race.

Of the 159 households, 18.2% had children under the age of 18 living with them, 28.9% were married couples living together, 2.5% had a female householder with no husband present, and 61.6% were non-families. Of all households, 46.5% were made up of individuals, and none had someone living alone who was 65 years of age or older. The average household size was 1.99 and the average family size was 2.90.

In the city, the population was spread out, with 18.7% under the age of 18, 9.5% from 18 to 24, 44.3% from 25 to 44, 26.3% from 45 to 64, and 1.3% who were 65 years of age or older. The median age was 35 years. For every 100 females, there were 184.7 males. For every 100 females age 18 and over, there were 188.8 males.

The median income for a household in the city was $52,727, and the median income for a family was $53,889. Males had a median income of $46,429 versus $35,000 for females. The per capita income for the city was $31,747. About 3.3% of families and 4.7% of the population were below the poverty line, none of whom were under the age of eighteen or over the age of sixty-five.

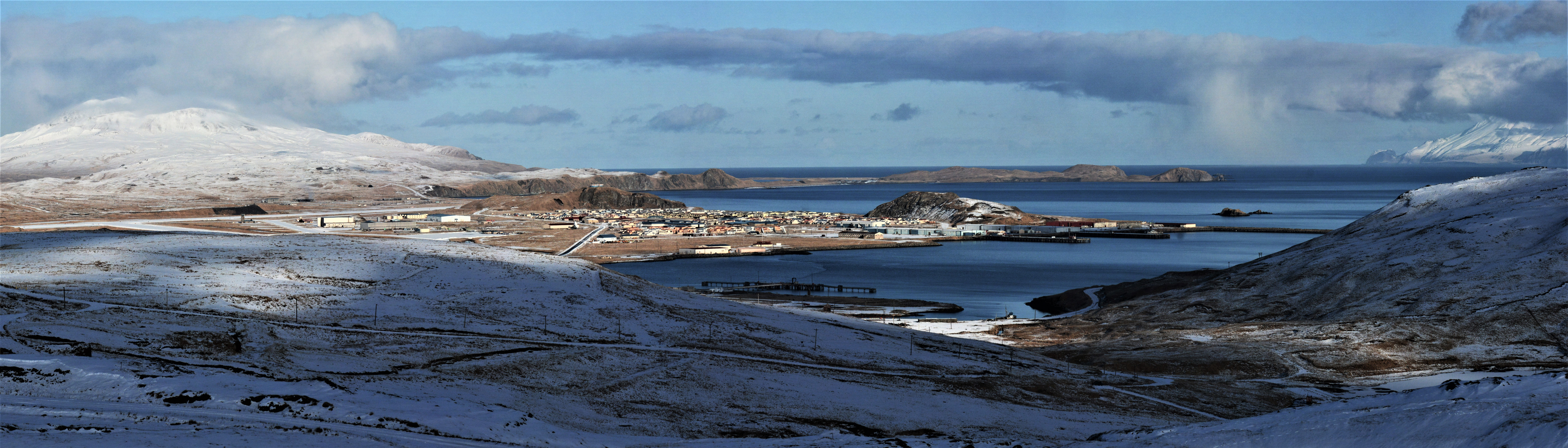

== Economy ==
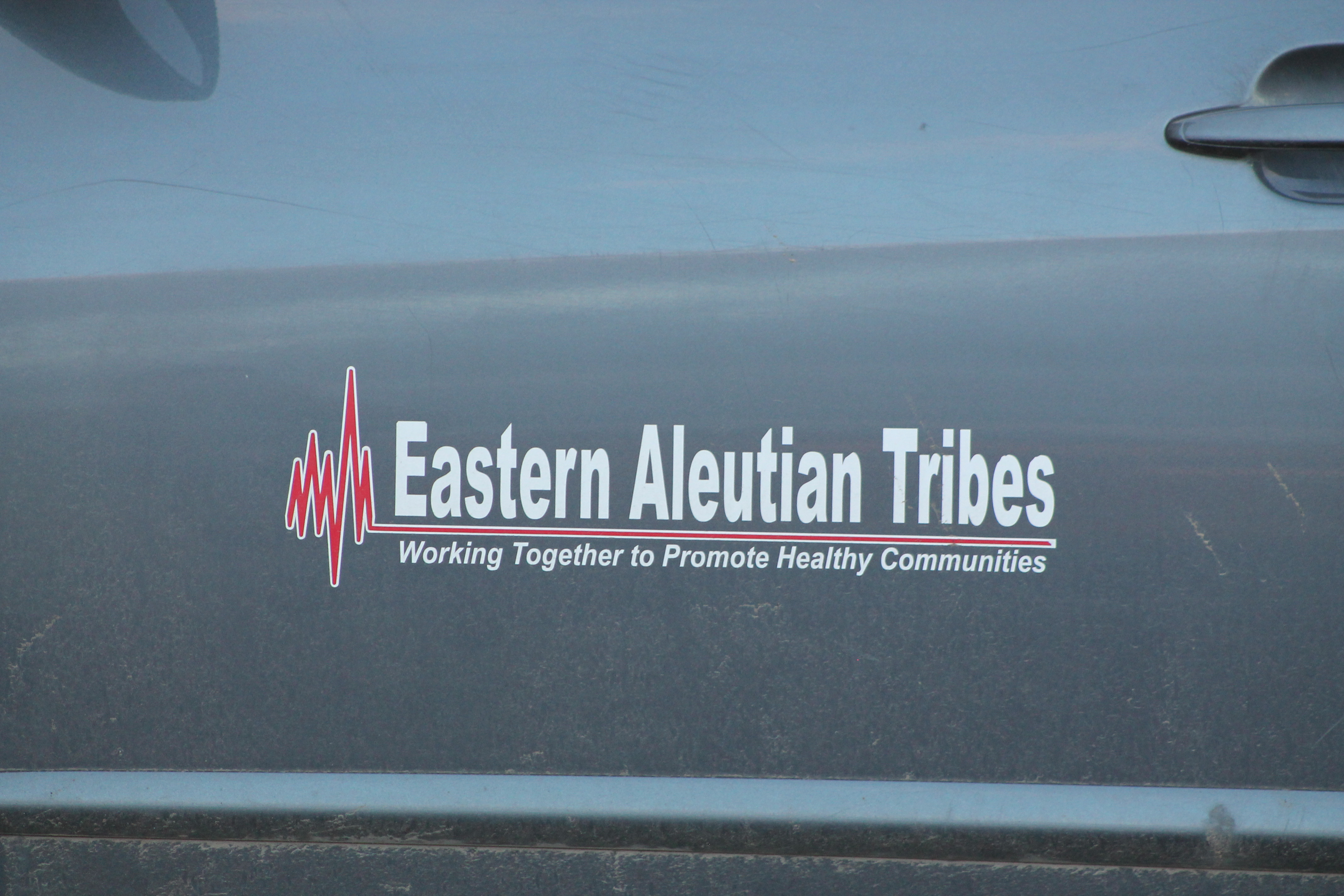
Logo on side of vehicle owned by Eastern Aleutian Tribes Inc.

A land exchange between Aleut Corp., the U.S. Navy, and the Department of the Interior transferred most of the former naval facilities to the Aleut Corp. in March 2004. A portion of the island remains within the Alaska Maritime National Wildlife Refuge, managed by the United States Fish and Wildlife Service. The U.S. Navy retains part of the north end of Adak Island (Parcel 4) and does annual sweeps of the Andrew Lake Seawall for unexploded ordnance. Their website lists the Institutional Controls in place for all of Adak as part of the land exchange or Interim Conveyance. The Navy provides the trail maps as part of the ordnance awareness information required to be shown to all Adak residents and visitors. Adak currently provides a fueling port and crew transfer facility for a combination of Seattle and Alaskan based fishing fleet — an airport, docks, housing facilities, restaurant, grocery, and ship supply store are available.

Golden Harvest Alaska Seafood processes Pacific cod, pollock, mackerel, halibut, snow and king crabs at a 144,000-square-foot seafood processing facility on the island. Four local residents hold commercial fishing permits, primarily for groundfish; however, commercial fishing vessels based out of Seattle and other parts of Alaska provide most of the work for the seafood plant by regularly offloading their catch at the facility's large dock. The local airport allows the company to send orders via air cargo from Adak to markets around the world, including entire planes full of live king crab to China.

== Government ==
=== Elections ===
Because Adak is in HST (once Daylight Saving Time ends), the furthest-west time zone in all areas of the United States that vote in US presidential elections, combined with the fact that polls in Alaska close at 8:00 PM while polls in Hawaii close at 7:00 PM, Adak ends up being the place where the last person votes in a US presidential election—when the polls close in Adak, the time is 1:00 AM Eastern Standard Time.

=== Education ===
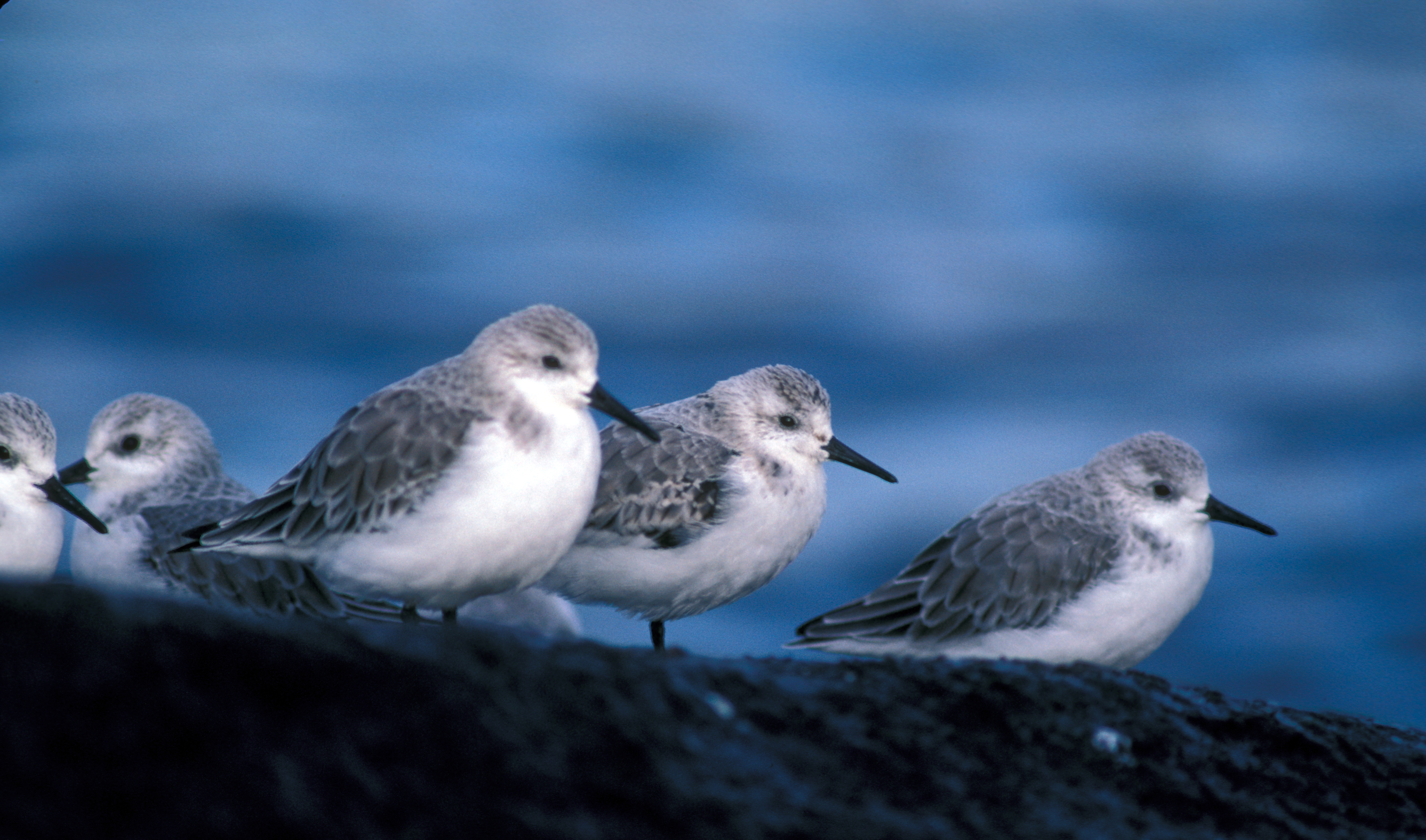
Sanderlings

There was one school located in the community: Adak School, operated by the Aleutian Region School District. In 2014, the Adak School had 25 students. It was previously served by the Adak Region School District, which closed in June 1996. The Adak School closed in 2023, reportedly due to low enrollment.

== Infrastructure ==
=== Water ===
Water is derived from Lake Bonnie Rose, Lake De Marie, and Nurses Creek, stored in seven water tanks throughout the community, and piped to facilities and housing units. The wastewater treatment system discharges through a marine outfall line to Kuluk Bay. Adak's water system is reported to have lead in it.

=== Waste ===
Waste was previously removed by a permitted landfill site; This site was operated on Adak Island under Alaska Department of Environmental Conservation (Alaska DEC) solid waste regulations. The landfill operated from the early 1950s until 1972 and from 1975 until 2002. The site was used to dispose of sanitary trash, metal debris, batteries, solvents, waste paints, and construction rubble. From 1975 on, the landfill only accepted sanitary trash.

The landfill was closed in 1997 by placing a low permeability soil cover over the landfill, implementing access restrictions, installing surface erosion controls, and placing a vegetative cover. In March 2002, the State of Alaska approved resumption of operations at Roberts Landfill through 2002 to dispose of inert demolition waste monofill and one cell for disposal of approximately 10 cubic yards of asbestos-containing material. Alaska DEC approved closure of the landfill in 2002.

=== Identified contaminants ===
Metals and volatile organic compounds (VOCs) are said to be in the groundwater and surface water.

=== Current actions ===
The Navy inspects institutional controls (ICs) annually. The Navy conducts groundwater monitoring at four wells and surface water monitoring at five locations annually.

=== Electricity ===
Electricity is provided by TDX which has invested over one million dollars in improving generating and distribution systems.

=== Internet access ===
A 2026 joint ProPublica/Anchorage Daily News investigation found that the US government spends about $340,000 per year to subsidize internet connections to Adak's homes. However, many of the homes are empty, and few if any of the remaining residents subscribed to it. At that time, many residents opted instead for Starlink, which offered cheaper and far faster internet connections.

=== Health care ===
There is no hospital; however there is Adak Community Health Center, managed by Eastern Aleutian Tribes, Inc. (EAT).

The health center provides Family Medicine, Chronic Care and urgent care services, and is staffed by a physician-assistant or, at times, by a community health practitioner. There is no doctor, no blood supply, and limited medications to stabilize a patient awaiting a medical evacuation, weather permitting. Behavioral Health is also provided via tele-video and quarterly site visits. EAT sends a dentist to Adak one week per year to provide limited dental services; otherwise, dental services must be referred outside of Adak. Tele-Radiology (X-ray) and Tele-Medicine are also present. Limited lab, pharmacy, and public health services are also available. The pharmacy medications are limited to acute medications. Filling of prescriptions from outside facilities usually cannot be accommodated. All visitors should bring plenty of their own medications as the health center stocks a very limited supply of chronic medications. Auxiliary emergency health care is provided by Adak Volunteer Fire Department.

=== Facilities ===
Other facilities in Adak include three deep water docks and fueling facilities. The city has requested funds to greatly expand the Sweeper Cove small boat harbor, including new breakwaters, a 315-foot (96 m) dock and new moorage floats. There are approximately 16 miles (26 km) of paved and primitive roads on Adak, all privately owned by the Aleut Corporation.

The Aleut are also seeking to develop their water system, which has been well-maintained and designed for a larger Naval population, as an export industry.

=== Airport ===
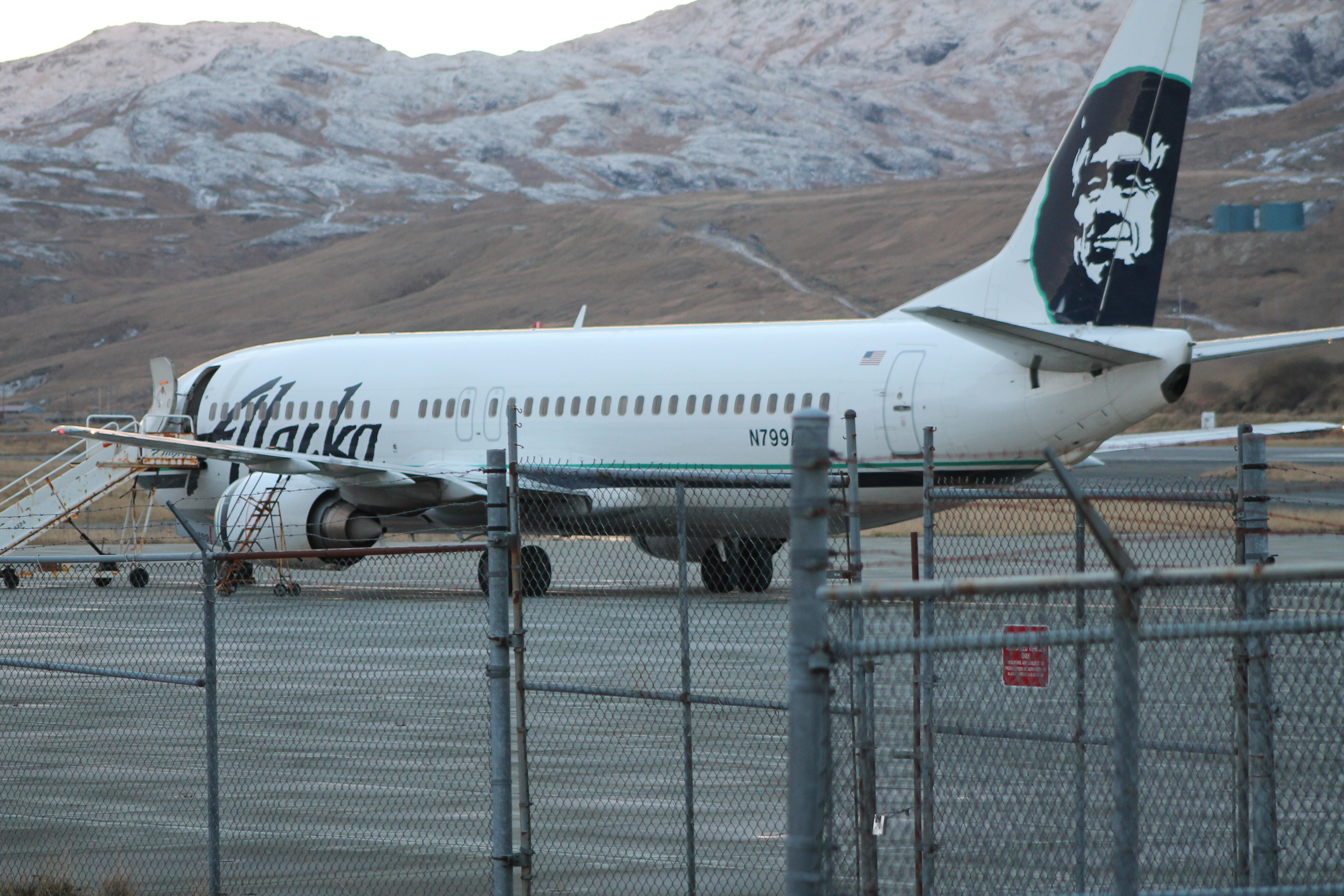
Alaska Airlines at Adak Airport

Because of its naval aviation past, Adak has an unusually large and sophisticated airport for the Aleutian Islands. The airport is currently operated by the State of Alaska Department of Transportation. Complete with an Instrument Landing System, Adak Airport has no control tower and two 200 ft (61 m) wide asphalt paved runways at 19 ft (5.8 m) elevation. One runway measures 7,790 ft (2,370 m) long while the other runway measures 7,605 ft (2,318 m). Alaska Airlines operates twice-weekly Boeing 737 passenger jet service from Anchorage. At present, flights operate each Wednesday and Saturday, weather permitting. Occasionally, extra seasonal flights are operated to meet the demand of the fishing season.

== Notable people ==
- David Brown (1956–2003), astronaut died in Space Shuttle Columbia STS-107 during orbital reentry, US Navy Captain worked as Director of Medical Services at the Navy Branch Hospital in Adak from 1984.
- David Vann (born 1966), author

== Gallery ==
At Kuluk Bowl for bowling August 2007

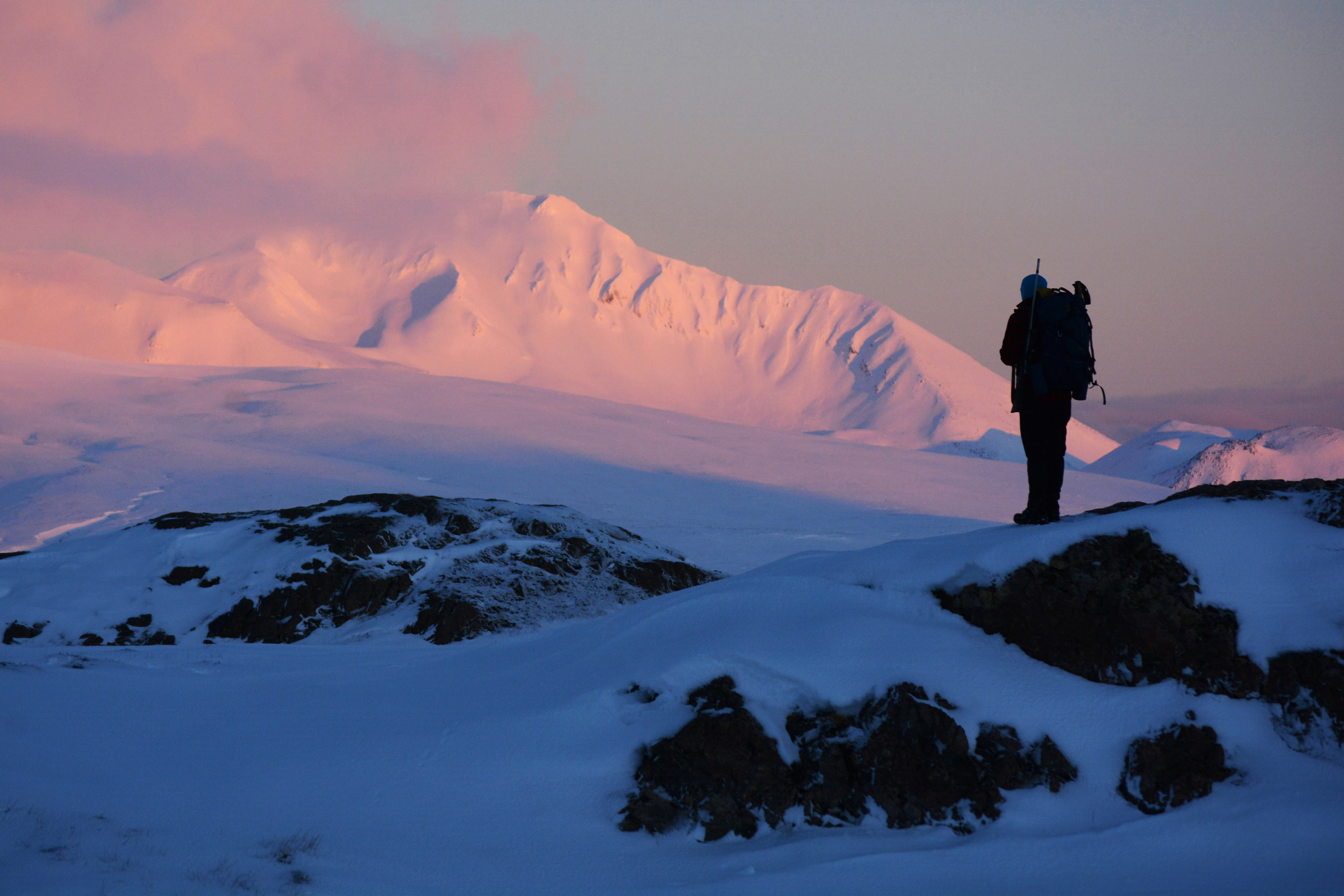
A hunter pauses to scan the landscape. Mt. Moffett, the highest point on Adak, rises in the background.

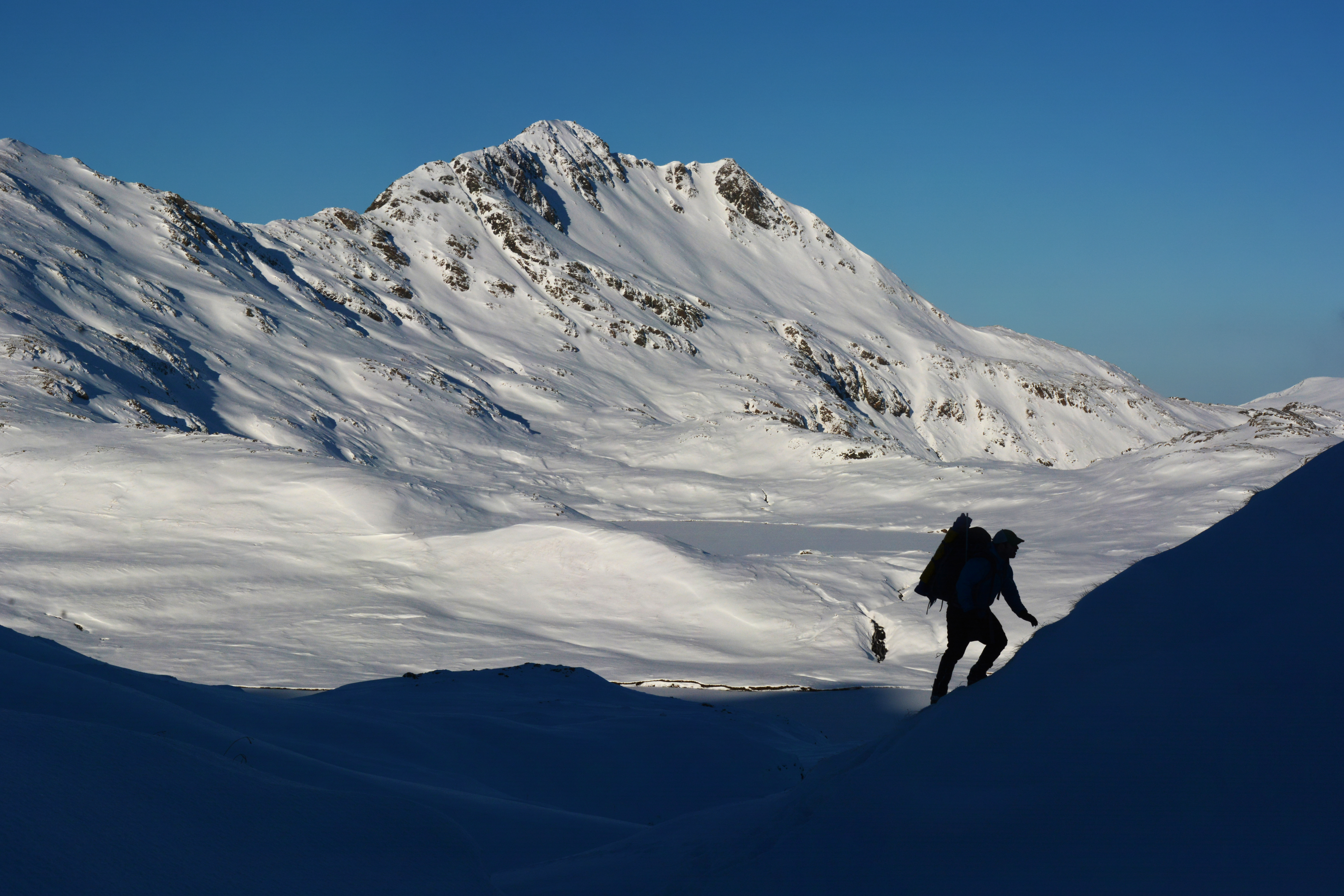
A hiker ascends the snowy slopes near Husky Pass, Mt. Reed in the background.
