= Aleutians East Borough School District =

School district in Alaska, United States

Address
- 100 Mossberry Lane Sand Point, Alaska, 99661; United States

District information
- Type: Public
- Grades: PreK–12
- NCES District ID: 0200007

Students and staff
- Students: 178
- Teachers: 21.30
- Staff: 29.04
- Student–teacher ratio: 8.36

Other information
- Website: www.aebsd.org

Aleutians East Borough School District (AEBSD) is a school district headquartered in Sand Point, Alaska.

Several smaller school districts consolidated into the AEBSD, which opened in 1988. Most of the schools were previously in the Aleutian Region School District, and that of King Cove was in its own school district.

For the 2023-2024 school year, the district had 205 students enrolled and employed 24 teachers. In 2015, the district operated four schools serving a total of 250 students.

== Schools ==
- Akutan School
- False Pass School
- King Cove School
- Sand Point School

Previously the district operated the Cold Bay School and the Nelson Lagoon School.
