= Tanadgusix Corporation =

Shareholder-owned Aleut Alaska Native village corporation

Tanadgusix Corporation (TDX) is a shareholder-owned Aleut Alaska Native village corporation founded in 1973. Located on Saint Paul Island, Alaska, US, the company is primarily involved in fish processing, shipping, real estate, tourism, the environment and power generation.

In 1971 the U.S. government settlement of Alaska Native land claims created the Alaska Native Claims Settlement Act corporations, including TDX.

TDX owns over 95% of Saint Paul Island and all or part of the fish processing industry, hotel, cable television, and tourism businesses.

== TDX Foundation ==
The TDX Foundation is the non-profit arm of Tanadgusix Corporation.

== TDX Power ==
TDX Power is a power production and distribution company with a hybrid wind-diesel power plant in Saint Paul (the largest hybrid wind-diesel power plant in Alaska), a 4-MW Cat diesel power plant in Sand Point, Alaska, and a 10-MW diesel and natural gas power plant on the North Slope in Deadhorse.
