= Mount Reed (Alaska) =

Mountain in Alaska, United States

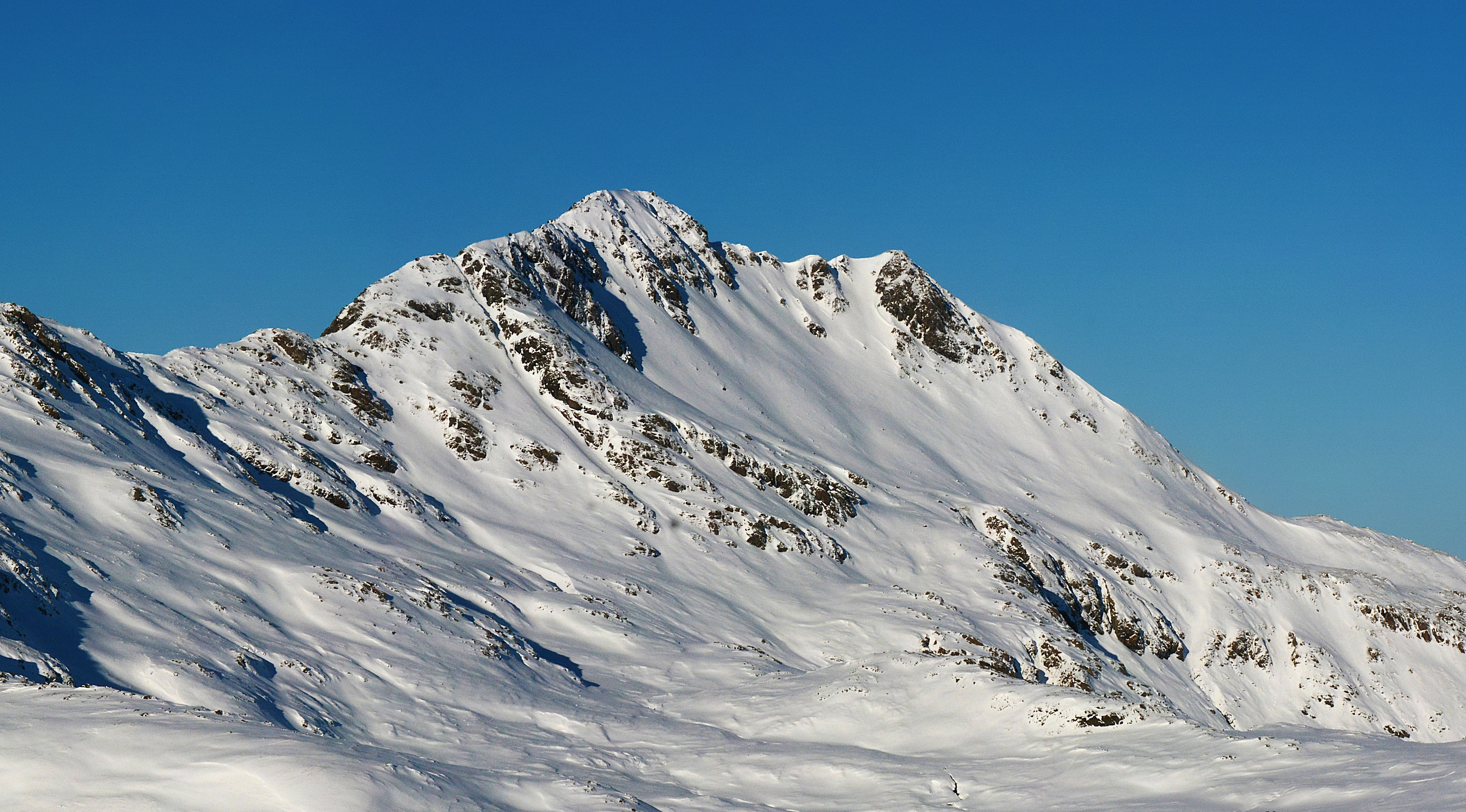
- Mount Reed in winter

Highest point
- Elevation: 1,929 ft (588 m)
- Prominence: 1,145 ft (349 m)
- Parent peak: Peak 2100
- Isolation: 3.95 mi (6.36 km)
- Coordinates: 51°49′29″N 176°42′03″W

Geography
- Location within Alaska
- Interactive map of Mount Reed
- Location: Aleutians West Census Area
- Country: United States
- State: Alaska
- Protected area: Alaska Maritime National Wildlife Refuge
- Parent range: Aleutian Range
- Topo map: USGS Adak C-3

Mount Reed is a 1,929-foot-elevation (588-meter) summit in Alaska, United States.

== Description ==
Mount Reed is located 2.5 miles (4.0 km) southwest of the community of Adak on Adak Island of the Aleutian Islands. This mountain is part of the Aleutian Range, and it is set within the Alaska Maritime National Wildlife Refuge. It is the prominent peak between Shagak Bay and the Bay of Islands. Topographic relief is significant as the summit rises 1,670 feet (509 meters) above Lake de Marie in approximately one mile (1.6 km). The Aleutian shield fern is a very rare species of plant which is only found on Mount Reed where the 142 clumps on this mountain are the only ones currently found growing in the wild anywhere in the world.

== History ==
The mountain was named by members of the U.S. Navy Aleutian Island Survey Expedition in 1934 after a local resident who was buried on or near the mountain. The mountain's toponym was officially adopted in 1936 by the United States Board on Geographic Names. The Aleutian shield fern found only on this mountain was listed as an endangered species in 1988.

== Climate ==
According to the Köppen climate classification system, Mount Reed is located in a subpolar oceanic climate zone with cold, snowy winters, and cool summers. Winter temperatures can drop to 10 °F and winter squalls that produce wind gusts in excess of 100 knots (120 mph; 190 km/h) can cause severe wind chill factors.

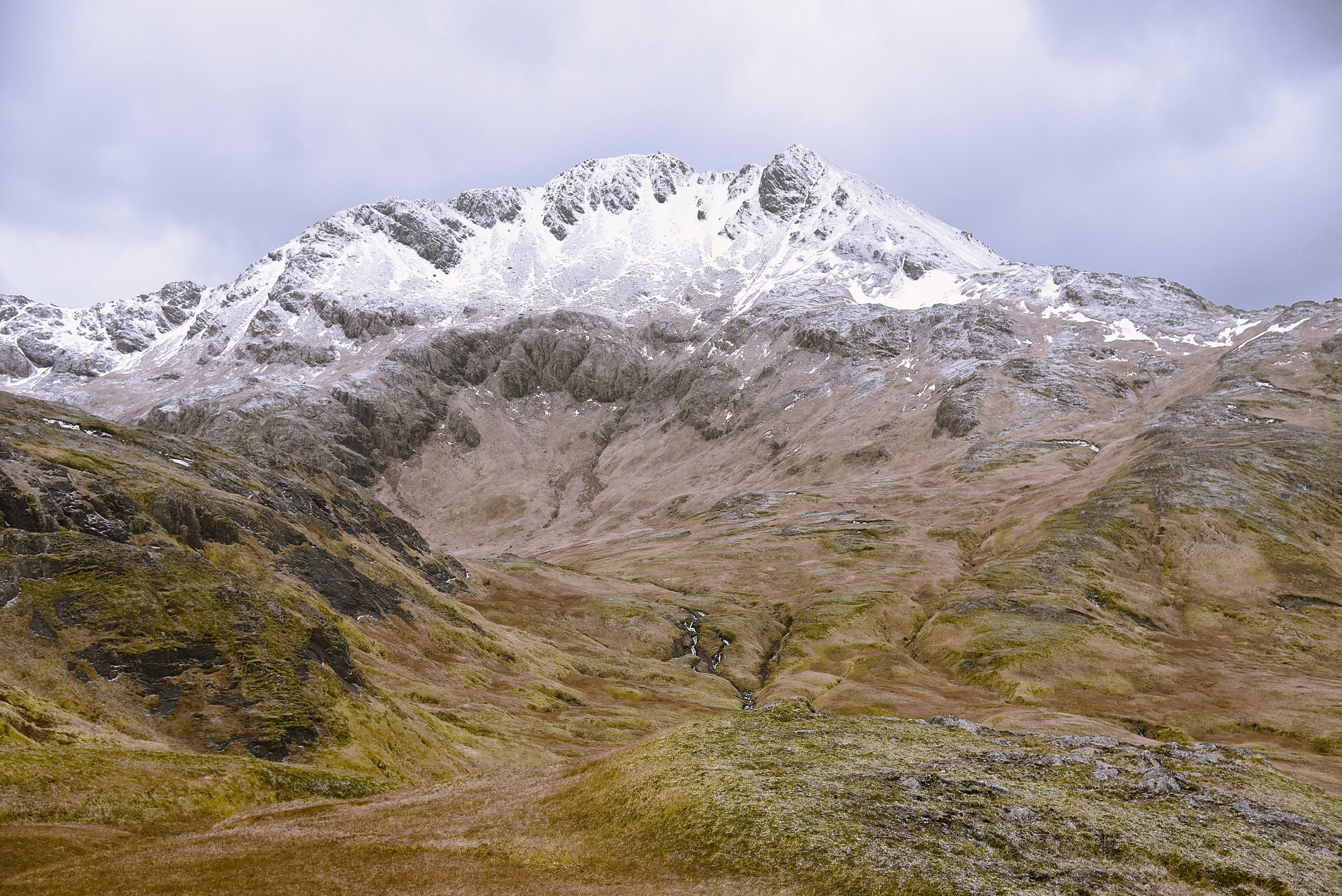
East aspect

== See also ==
- List of mountain peaks of Alaska
