= Nelson Lagoon, Alaska =

Nelson Lagoon, Alaska Niilsanam Alĝuudaa
- CDP
- Location in Alaska
- Coordinates: 56°0′2″N 161°12′13″W
- Country: United States
- State: Alaska
- Borough: Aleutians East

Government
  - Borough mayor: Alvin D. Osterback
  - State senator: Lyman Hoffman (D)
  - State rep.: Bryce Edgmon (I)

Area
  - Total: 246.98 sq mi (639.67 km^{2})
  - Land: 188.10 sq mi (487.18 km^{2})
  - Water: 58.88 sq mi (152.49 km^{2})
- Elevation: 39 ft (12 m)

Population (2020)
  - Total: 41
  - Density: 0.21/sq mi (0.08/km^{2})
- Time zone: UTC-9 (Alaska (AKST))
  - Summer (DST): UTC-8 (AKDT)
- ZIP code: 99571
- Area code: 907
- FIPS code: 02-52940

Nelson Lagoon (Unangax̂: Niilsanam Alĝuudaa) is a census-designated place (CDP) in Aleutians East Borough, Alaska, United States. At the 2020 census the population was 41, down from 52 in 2010 and 83 in 2000.

Nelson Lagoon was established around 1960 and is the youngest of the Borough communities. It is the only Aleut settlement on the Bering Sea shore. The community is on the northern coast of the Alaska Peninsula and sits on a narrow sand spit that separates the lagoon from the Bering Sea. Nelson Lagoon is in the middle of a rich and productive salmon fisheries area. The community's dock, boat ramp, harbormaster's office and warehouse were completed in the late 1990s. Nelson Lagoon has docking facilities as well as boat and gear storage. A state-owned 4,000-foot-long lighted gravel runway allows regularly scheduled flights.

In March 2016, Nelson Lagoon was coated with tephra, during a strong eruption of nearby Mount Pavlof.

== History ==
The location where Nelson Lagoon sits was used as an Aleut summer campsite during the fishing season. In 1882, the lagoon was named for Edward William Nelson, a naturalist and explorer who travelled the region between 1877 and 1920. From 1906 until 1917, a salmon salting facility operated at the location, which was staffed mainly by Scandinavian fishermen. These men married local women, and today most native people in Nelson Bay have partial Scandinavian ancestry.

A permanent settlement was established in 1960. A school was built five years later, and the settlement grew into a larger permanent community.

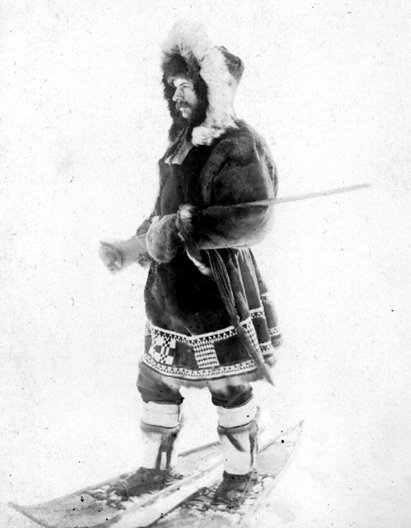
Edward William Nelson in Alaska

In 1985, an environmental impact statement by the Minerals Management Service of the United States Department of the Interior was released, producing an in-depth analysis of the Nelson Bay community and its cultural, demographic, religious, political and educational atmosphere as well as predictions. The statement wrote about a well-organized, tight-knit community. The study reported the five-member Nelson Bay village council was formed in 1971, still consisted of all its original members, met often, and was competent and unified in its representation of the community. Unlike other villages, in Nelson Bay, politics were a familial affair; village councils represented the three main families in the village.

The environmental impact statement wrote that culturally and economically, the village was much as it was at the time of its founding: small, relatively undeveloped and very isolated. The village's younger generations were reported to have developed the unique tendency of brothers of one family marrying sisters of another family, thus requiring future generations to find spouses in other communities.

The Russian Orthodox Church was the village's dominant religion at the time, but secularization was taking place. Education was highly valued in the Nelson Bay, and the 1985 environmental impact statement wrote this could have been a legacy of the village's Scandinavian ancestors.

== Geography ==
Nelson Lagoon is located at 56°0′2″N 161°12′13″W (56.000522, -161.203561), located on a narrow sand spit separating the lagoon from the Bering Sea on the northern coast of the Alaska Peninsula.

According to the U.S. Census Bureau, the CDP has a total area of 196.6 square miles (509 km^{2}), of which, 135.3 square miles (350 km^{2}) of it is land and 61.4 square miles (159 km^{2}) of it (31.22%) is water.

== Environment ==
=== Climate ===
Nelson Lagoon has a maritime climate. Weather is dramatic and irregular, with constant 20–25 miles per hour (32–40 km/h) wind. The temperature averages from 25 to 50 °F (−4 to 10 °C), and ranges from −15 to 75 °F (−26 to 24 °C). Average annual snowfall amounts to 56 inches.

== Demographics ==
Historical population
Census	Pop.	Note	%±
1970	43		—
1980	59		37.2%
1990	83		40.7%
2000	83		0.0%
2010	52		−37.3%
2020	41		−21.2%
U.S. Decennial Census

Nelson Lagoon first reported on the 1970 U.S. Census as an unincorporated village. It was made a census-designated place (CDP) in 1980.

=== 2010 census ===
As of the census of 2010, there were 52 people, 22 households, and 14 families residing in the CDP. The population density was .26 people per square mile (10 people/km^{2}). There were 32 housing units at an average density of 0.2 units per square mile (0.077 units/km^{2}). The racial makeup of the CDP was 21.2% White, 75% Native American, 1.9% Asian, and 1.9% from two or more races.

There were 22 households, out of which 22.7% had children under the age of 18 living with them, 54.5% were married couples living together, 4.5% had a female householder with no husband present, and 46.4% were non-families. 22.7% of all households were made up of individuals, and 4.5% had someone living alone who was 65 years of age or older. The average household size was 2.36 and the average family size was 2.71.

In the CDP, the population was spread out, with 13.5% under the age of 18, 0% from 18 to 24, 46.1% from 25 to 44, 28.8% from 45 to 64, and 7.7% who were 65 years of age or older. The median age was 41 years. For every 100 females, there were 108 males. For every 100 females age 18 and over, there were 114 males.

The median income for a household in the CDP was $43,750, and the median income for a family was $53,750. Males had a median income of $31,250 versus $59,583 for females. The per capita income for the CDP was $27,596. There were no families and 6.4% of the population living below the poverty line, including no under eighteens and none of those over 64.

=== 2000 census ===
As of the census of 2000, there were 83 people, 31 households, and 19 families residing in the CDP. The population density was 0.6 inhabitants per square mile (0.23/km^{2}). There were 33 housing units at an average density of 0.2 units per square mile (0.077 units/km^{2}). The racial makeup of the CDP was 13.25% White, 78.31% Native American, 2.41% Asian, and 6.02% from two or more races.

There were 31 households, out of which 41.9% had children under the age of 18 living with them, 51.6% were married couples living together, 9.7% had a female householder with no husband present, and 35.5% were non-families. 19.4% of all households were made up of individuals, and 3.2% had someone living alone who was 65 years of age or older. The average household size was 2.68 and the average family size was 3.15.

In the CDP, the population was spread out, with 30.1% under the age of 18, 6.0% from 18 to 24, 33.7% from 25 to 44, 26.5% from 45 to 64, and 3.6% who were 65 years of age or older. The median age was 33 years. For every 100 females, there were 107.5 males. For every 100 females age 18 and over, there were 107.1 males.

The median income for a household in the CDP was $43,750, and the median income for a family was $53,750. Males had a median income of $31,250 versus $59,583 for females. The per capita income for the CDP was $27,596. There were no families and 6.4% of the population living below the poverty line, including no under eighteens and none of those over 64.

=== Religion ===
A 1985 environmental impact statement by the Minerals Management Service of the United States Department of the Interior reported that while Russian Orthodoxy was the dominant religion in Nelson Lagoon, a trend towards secularization was taking place, especially among the younger generations. The report noted that religion "is an important secondary activity [that] neither factionalized nor integrated residents at the community level."

== Economy ==
Nelson Lagoon depends on salmon fishing, and the nearby fishery area is especially productive. Due to the seasonal nature of the fishing industry, subsistence activities are necessary during parts of the year, including animal trapping.

Tides Inn Motel and Cafe is the only hotel and restaurant in Nelson Lagoon. There is also a United States Post Office.

== Culture ==
The culture revolved around the community's Native American heritage as well as traditional activities such as fishing and subsistence activities.

== Government ==
Nelson Lagoon has a five-member village council.

== Education ==
=== Nelson Lagoon School ===
The Nelson Lagoon School was a public school operating under the administration of the Aleutians East Borough School District (AEBSD). It closed in 2012 and as of 2015 there are no school-age children remaining in the village.

Circa 1978 the school, then a part of the Aleutian Region School District, had two teachers and 18 students.

== Infrastructure ==
=== Transportation ===
Nelson Lagoon is only accessible by boat or plane. The Nelson Lagoon Airport has a 4,000-foot long gravel runway serving regular flights.

There is also a dock, boat ramp and harbormaster's office.
