= Adak Region School District =

Defunct school district in Alaska, US

Location
- Adak, Alaska; United States

District information
- Grades: K–12
- Closed: 1996
- Schools: 1 (Adak Naval Station School)

Students and staff
- Students: 551
- Teachers: 37

Adak Region School District was a school district formerly in operation in Adak, Alaska.

== History ==
The district's sole school was the K-12 Adak Naval Station School, which had 37 teachers and 551 students circa October 1978.

Ed Gilley was the final superintendent of the district; he was hired for the position in 1989. Circa 1994 the final student left the Adak district as the Adak Naval Air Station closed. The students left the district when the U.S. Navy removed children and spouses from the air station. The district itself closed in June 1996, due to a ruling from a state court.

From 1994 to 1996, Gilley remained as the superintendent as he was distributing district assets. Gilley became the superintendent of the Kashunamiut School District after the dissolution of the Adak district. The state of Alaska sought to revoke Gilley's certificate for being a school administrator, accusing him of improperly billing the district, taking district-funded trips, and unfairly reporting a higher income than he had to the Alaska teacher retirement system. In 1998, Gilley agreed to voluntarily give up his license without admitting to wrongdoing.

Adak School was established by the Aleutian Region School District. It closed in 2023.
