= Adak Airport =

Island airport in Alaska, United States

- IATA: ADK; ICAO: PADK; FAA LID: ADK

Summary
- Airport type: Public
- Owner: Alaska DOT&PF - Central Region
- Serves: Adak Island, Alaska
- Location: Adak, Alaska
- Elevation AMSL: 18 ft (5.5 m)
- Coordinates: 51°52′41″N 176°38′46″W

Map
- Location of airport in Alaska

Runways
Direction	Length		Surface
Direction	ft	m	Surface
5/23	7,790	2,374	Asphalt

Statistics (2015)
- Aircraft operations: 340 (2013)
- Based aircraft: 0
- Passengers: 4,062
- Freight: 1,024,000 lbs
- Source: Federal Aviation Administration

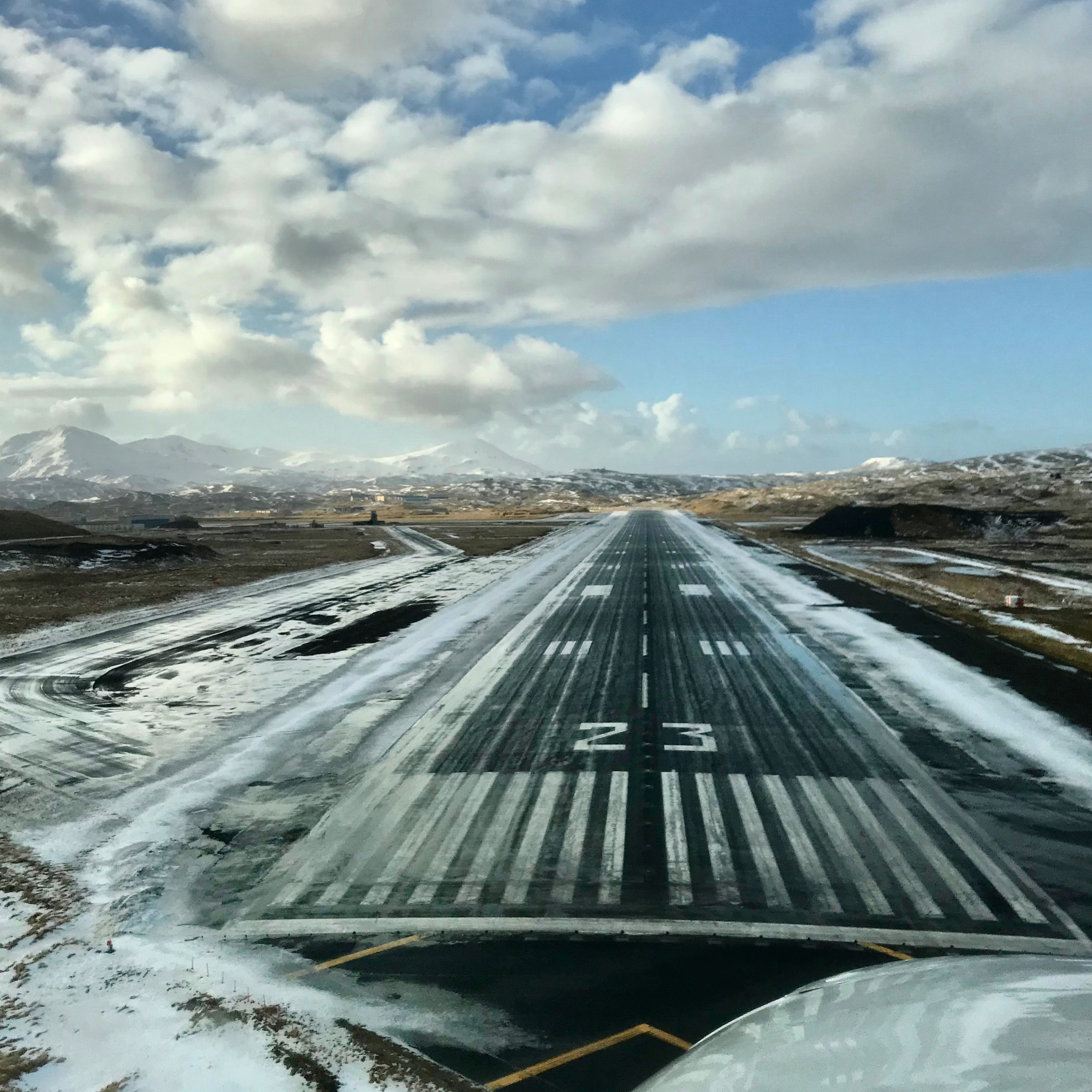
Approaching short final to Runway 23 at Adak Airport

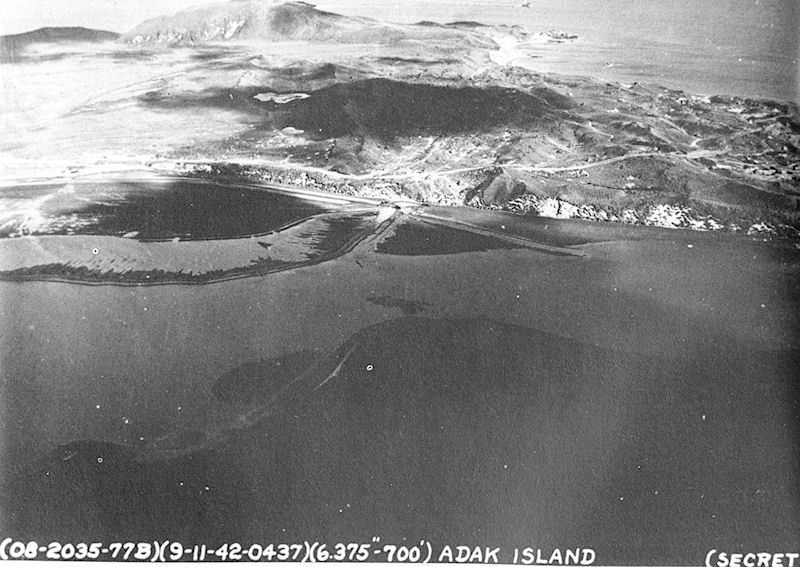
Adak/Longview AAF, September 1942

Adak Airport (IATA: ADK, ICAO: PADK, FAA LID: ADK) is a state-owned public-use airport located west of Adak, on Adak Island in the Aleutian Islands in the U.S. state of Alaska. The airport is the farthest western airfield with scheduled passenger air service in the entire United States at 176.64W.

Adak's airport is one of the largest airports in the Aleutian Islands. Built by the U.S. Navy for Naval air transport, the airport consists of one 7,800-foot (2,400 m) runway equipped with an Instrument Landing System and glideslope which facilitate Instrument Flight Rules landings. Adak currently has scheduled jet service, every Wednesday and Saturday, provided by Alaska Airlines.

As per the Federal Aviation Administration, this airport had 1,989 passenger boardings (enplanements) in calendar year 2008, 1,907 in 2009, and 2,097 in 2010. The National Plan of Integrated Airport Systems for 2011–2015 categorized it as a general aviation facility (the commercial service category requires at least 2,500 enplanements per year).

== History ==
The military first developed an air station on Adak during World War II. Adak Army Airfield was used during the Aleutian Campaign by both USAAF and Naval Air units, particularly in defensive actions against Japanese forces occupying Attu and Kiska.

Following the war, the AAF turned Adak over to the United States Air Force until 1950, and then to the Navy who established anti-submarine warfare base there. Adak was most recently run by the U.S. Navy as a deployment base for P-3 Orion maritime patrol aircraft, primarily to conduct antisubmarine warfare operations against submarines and surveillance of naval surface vessels of the former Soviet Union. As many as 5,000 US personnel lived at the base during the Cold War, many with families.

Adak was also used as a refueling stop for transpacific passenger flights. Pan Am first operated a Seattle-Adak-Tokyo flight in 1946 to demonstrate the viability of a transpacific great circle route to the United Nations Relief and Rehabilitation Administration.

On 31 March 1997, the Navy closed Adak Naval Air Facility. A large portion of the former military facility's property was transferred to the Aleut Corporation in 2004 and became a National Wildlife Refuge.

== Facilities and aircraft ==
Adak Airport resides at elevation of 18 feet (5 m) above mean sea level. It has one operational runway, 5/23, with an asphalt surface. It is 7,790 by 200 feet (2,374 x 61 m). Runway 18/36, permanently closed in fall 2015, is 7,605 by 200 feet (2,318 x 61 m).

For the 12-month period ending January 2, 2011, the airport had 340 aircraft operations, an average of 28 per month: 62.4% scheduled commercial, 29.4% general aviation, and 8.2% military.

== Airlines and destinations ==
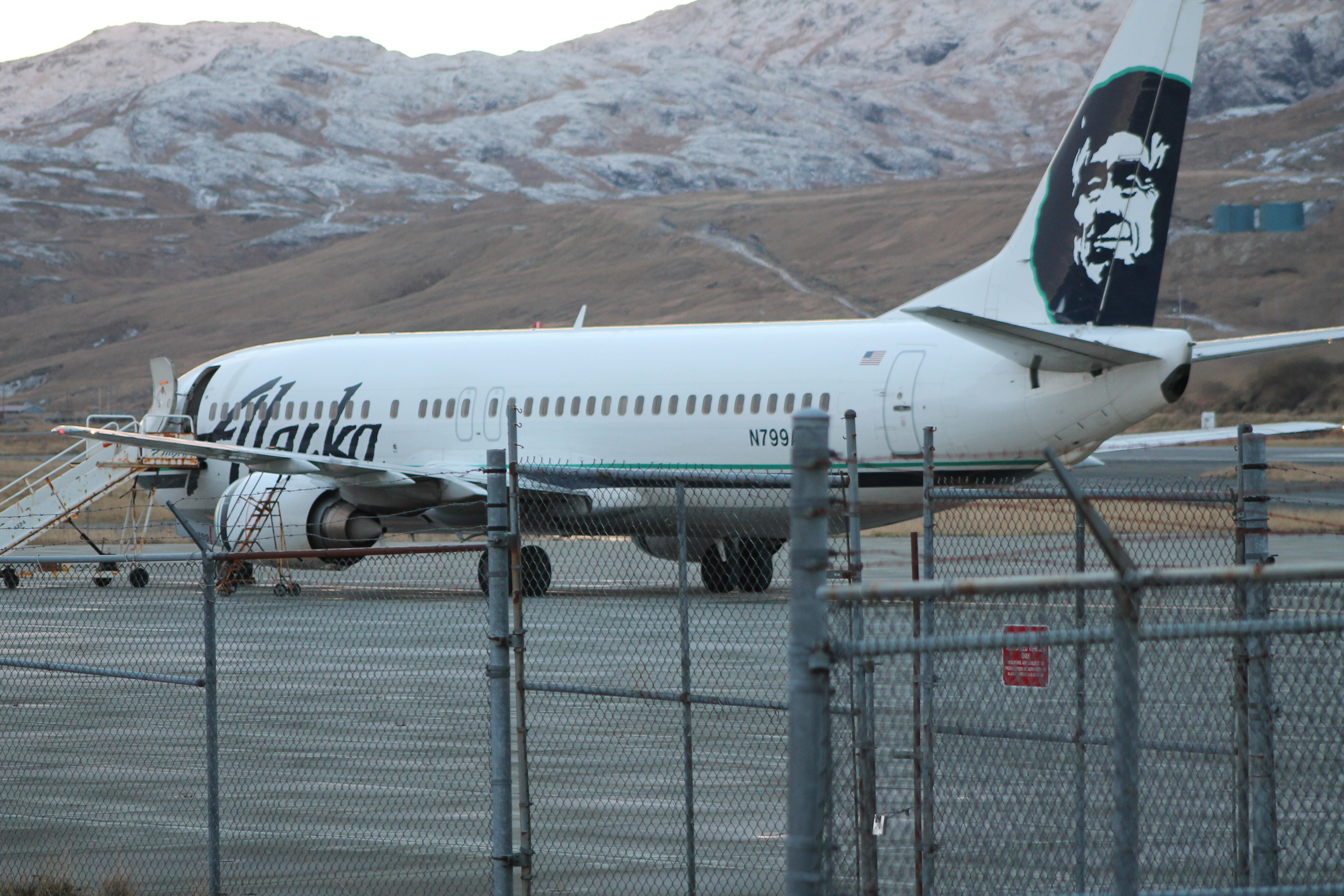
Alaska Airlines Boeing 737-400 at Adak Airport

Scheduled passenger service is subsidized by the Essential Air Service (EAS) program. Alaska Airlines operates two flights weekly, on Wednesdays and Saturdays, using Boeing 737-700 or Boeing 737-800 jet aircraft and previously with Boeing 737-400 jet aircraft.

Airlines	Destinations
Alaska Airlines	Anchorage

=== Statistics ===
Carrier shares: October 2024 – September 2025
Carrier	Passengers (arriving and departing)
Alaska Airlines	5,060(100.00%)

Top domestic destinations: October 2024 – September 2025
Rank	City	Airport name & IATA code	Passengers
1	Anchorage, AK	Ted Stevens Anchorage International Airport (ANC)	5,060

== Historical airline service ==
Reeve Aleutian Airways (RAA) served Adak from the late 1940s until 2000 when the airline ceased all flight operations and went out of business. In 1948, Reeve Aleutian was operating Douglas DC-3 service once a week between Anchorage and the airport. From the 1970s through the early 1980s, the airline was operating nonstop service several times a week from Adak to Anchorage (ANC) with Lockheed L-188 Electra turboprop aircraft. Reeve Aleutian also operated nonstop Electra propjet service from the airport to Attu Island during the 1970s. Jet service arrived during the mid 1980s with Reeve Aleutian operating Boeing 727-100 jetliners from the airport nonstop to Anchorage twice a week. By 1989, the airline was operating nonstop 727 service three times a week from Adak to Anchorage. In 1994, Reeve Aleutian was operating four direct flights a week between the airport and Anchorage with Boeing 727-100 jets configured for combi aircraft passenger/freight operations with all of these flights making intermediate stop in each direction at the Cold Bay Airport in the Aleutian Islands. In 2020 and 2021, the flight to Adak would stop in Cold Bay to assist with the shutdown of commuter flights from Anchorage to Cold Bay and Unalaska. The stop was discontinued in Summer 2021.

== See also ==
- List of airports in Alaska

== Other sources ==
- "State Takes Over Adak Airport". State of Alaska Press Release. January 15, 2004. Archived from the original on September 23, 2006.
- Essential Air Service documents (Docket DOT-OST-2000-8556) from the U.S. Department of Transportation:
  - Order 2004-6-24 (June 25, 2004): re-selecting Alaska Airlines to provide essential air service at Adak, Alaska, at an annual subsidy rate of $1,617,923, for the period May 1, 2004, through June 30, 2006.
  - Order 2006-5-21 (May 23, 2006): re-selecting Alaska Airlines to provide essential air service at Adak, Alaska, at an annual subsidy rate of $1,393,384, and Peninsula Airways for $449,605 at Atka and $314,694 at Nikolski. The three rates extend through June 30, 2008.
  - Order 2008-3-36 (March 31, 2008): re-selecting Alaska Airlines to provide essential air service at Adak, Alaska, at an annual subsidy rate of $1,483,122, and Peninsula Airways for $513,803 at Atka and $469,786 at Nikolski. The three rates extend through June 30, 2010.
  - Order 2010-7-9 (July 15, 2010): re-selecting Alaska Airlines to provide essential air service (EAS) at Adak, Alaska, at an annual subsidy rate of $1,675,703, and Peninsula Airways, Inc., for $290,780 at Atka and $639,008 at Nikolski. The three rates extend through June 30, 2012.
  - Order 2012-9-10 (September 11, 2012): re-selecting Alaska Airlines, Inc. to provide Essential Air Service (EAS) at Adak, Alaska, consisting of two nonstop or one-stop round trips per week with Boeing 737 combi aircraft between Adak and Anchorage for an annual rate of $1,675,703, for only a one-year period.
  - Order 2013-7-14 (July 16, 2013): re-selecting Alaska Airlines, Inc., to provide Essential Air Service (EAS) at Adak, Alaska, for $2,057,114 annual subsidy from October 1, 2013, through September 30, 2015.
