= Naval Air Facility Adak =

U.S. Navy airport in Alaska, U.S.

- Adak, Adak Island, Alaska in the United States
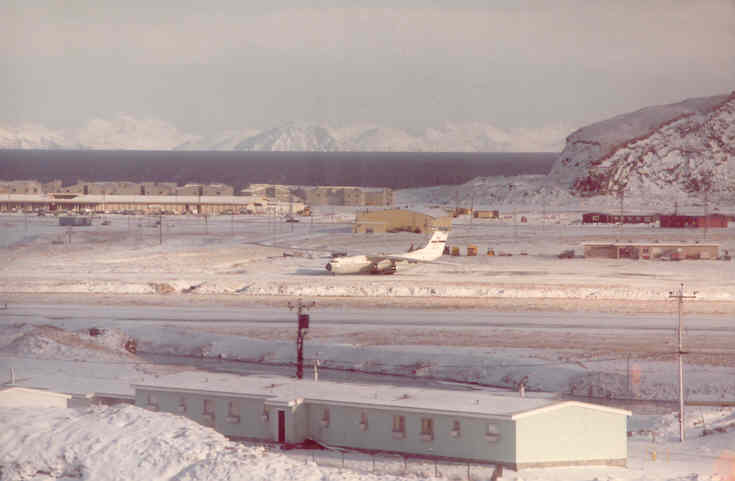
- NAF Adak, 1970

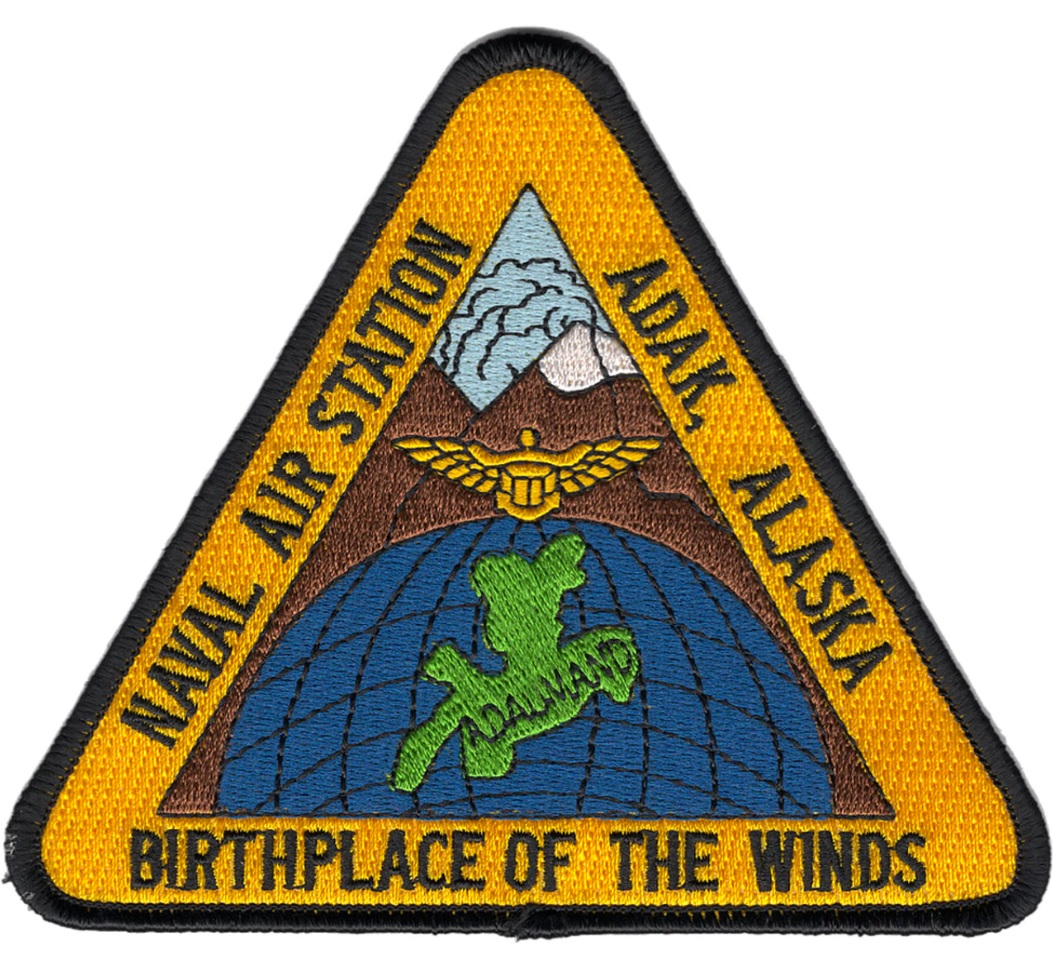

Site information
- Type: Naval air facility
- Owner: Department of Defense
- Operator: US Navy
- Condition: Closed

Location
- Location in Alaska
- Coordinates: 51°52′41″N 176°38′46″W

Site history
- Built: 1942 (as Adak Army Airfield)
- In use: 1942–1947 (US Army Air Forces); 1947–1950 (US Air Force); 1950–1997 (US Navy)
- Fate: Transferred to civilian use and became Adak Airport

Airfield information
- Identifiers: IATA: ADK, ICAO: PADK, FAA LID: ADK, WMO: 704540/704543
- Elevation: 5 metres (16 ft) AMSL
Runways
Direction	Length and surface
05/23	2,374 metres (7,789 ft) Asphalt
18/36	2,318 metres (7,605 ft) Asphalt

U.S. National Register of Historic Places

U.S. National Historic Landmark
- Official name: Adak Army Base and Adak Naval Operating Station
- Designated: 27 February 1987
- Reference no.: 87000841
- Period: 1900–
- Area of significance: Military

Naval Air Facility Adak (IATA: ADK, ICAO: PADK, FAA LID: ADK), was a United States Navy airport located on Adak Island, west of Adak, Alaska. After its closure in 1997, it was reopened as Adak Airport. The facility was designated a National Historic Landmark for its role in World War II, although most of its elements from that period have been demolished or lie in ruins.

== History ==
=== Adak Army Airfield ===
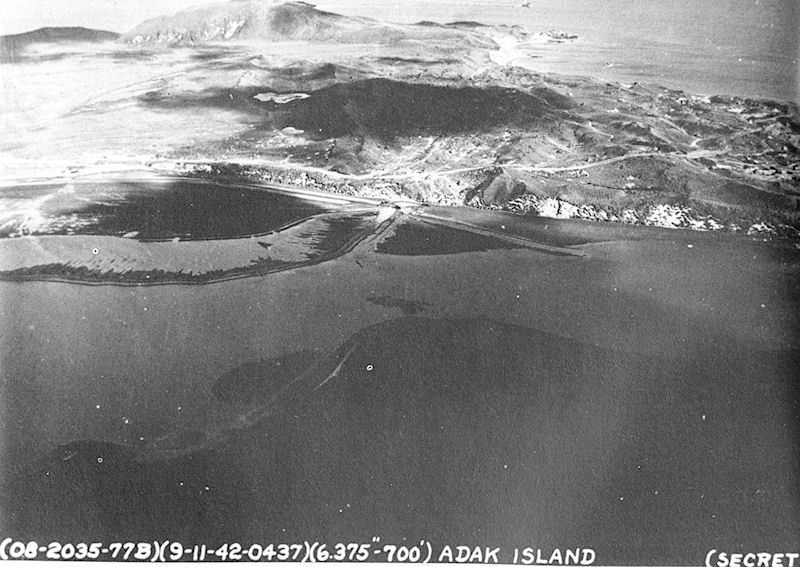
Adak Army Airfield, 11 September 1942

On June 6/7, 1942, the Japanese Navy and Army participated in the only invasion of the United States during World War II through the Aleutian Islands of Kiska and Attu as part of the Aleutian Islands Campaign. Despite the first loss of U.S. soil to a foreign enemy since the War of 1812, the campaign was not considered a priority by the Joint Chiefs of Staff. British Prime Minister Churchill stated that sending forces to attack the Japanese presence there was a diversion from the North African Campaign. Admiral Chester Nimitz saw it as a diversion from his operations in the Central Pacific.

Commanders in Alaska believed the Japanese occupiers would establish airbases in the Aleutians that would put major cities along the United States West Coast within range of their bombers. Once the islands were again in United States hands, forward bases could be established to attack Japan from there.

The establishment of Adak Army Airfield (Code Name A-2, also "Longview") on 30 August 1942 gave the United States Army Air Forces a forward base to attack the Japanese forces on Kiska Island. The landing was made in a storm and within a week additional forces, including the 807th Engineer Aviation Battalion were landed on the island at Kuhluk Bay. The island had not been properly surveyed to find a suitable site to build the airfield. A very quick survey of the coast located a tidal marsh which had a firm foundation of sand and gravel beneath it.

Work began on 2 September, with the construction of an enclosing dike around the marsh and a system of drainage canals drain off the water. The topsoil was scraped off to reach the gravel underneath. Additional gravel and a sand runway was laid down. By 10 September enough construction had been completed that a 73d Bomb Squadron B-18 Bolo successfully landed on the runway. A 5,000 ft Pierced Steel Planking was laid down shortly afterward. The transports from the 42d Troop Carrier Squadron arrived the following day, landing on compacted sand next to where the matting was being laid.

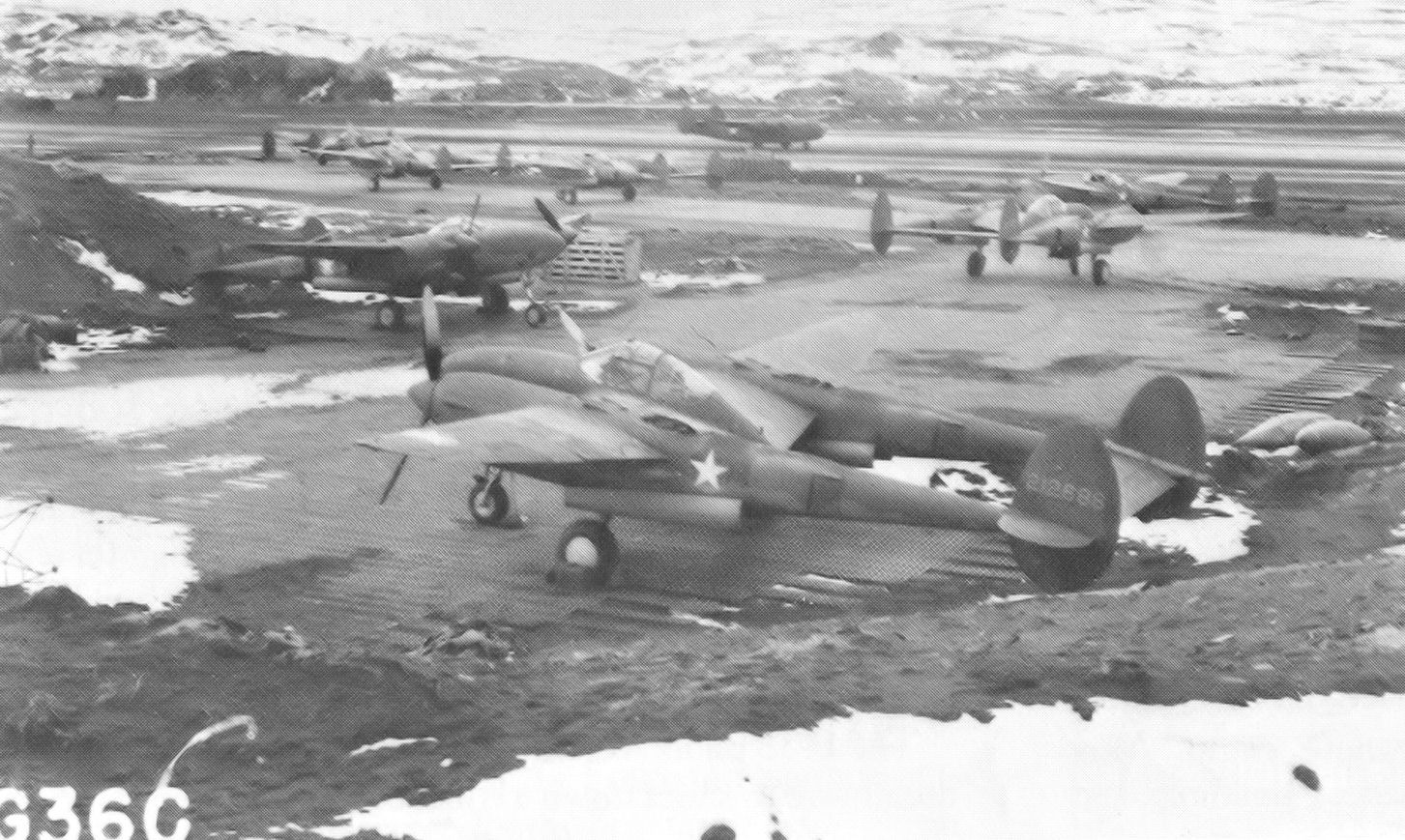
54th Fighter Squadron P-38 Lightnings at Adak AAF, 1942

Tents were erected, a rudimentary electrical system, radios and some rough streets were laid down. By the end of September Adak Army Airfield was home to several 36th Bomb Squadron B-17 Flying Fortress heavy bombers; 54th Fighter Squadron P-38 Lightnings, and five B-24 Liberators of the 21st and 404th Bombardment Squadrons. Additional P-38s were flown in along with some P-39D Airacobras of the 42d Fighter Squadron, which had been providing air defense for Kodiak. Even while aircraft were landing, construction continued at a rapid pace to cover the PSP with several layers of asphalt and construct additional station facilities.

During World War II, the following units were assigned to Adak AAF:

- 343d Fighter Group, 7 March-25 July 1943
- 28th Bombardment Group, 14 March 1943 – 25 February 1944)
- 11th Fighter Squadron, 20 February 1943 – 11 August 1945 (P-40 Warhawk, P-38 Lightning)

Detachments at Amchitka Army Airfield, 27 March-27 May 1943; 23 March 1944 – 20 July 1945

- 18th Fighter Squadron, 6 December 1942 – 15 February 1943 (P-40 Warhawk, P-38 Lightning)
- 42d Fighter Squadron, 10 September-12 December 1942 (P-39 Airacobra)
- 54th Fighter Squadron, 31 August 1942 – 12 March 1943 (P-40 Warhawk, P-38 Lightning)
- 21st Bombardment Squadron, 21 September-15 November 1942; 16 December 1942-Undetermined; 18 February-13 August 1943 (LB-30, B-24 Liberator)
- 36th Bombardment Squadron, 4 June 1942 – 1 May 1943 (Detachment); 1 June-4 August 1943 (B-24 Liberator) (B-17E Flying Fortress)
- 73d Bombardment Squadron, August 1942 – April 1943 (Detachment) (B-25 Mitchell, B-26 Marauder)
- 77th Bombardment Squadron, 3 October 1942 – 11 September 1943 (B-25 Mitchell, B-26 Marauder)
- 404th Bombardment Squadron, 13–21 September 1942; March 1943-26 February 1944

Detachment at Amchitka Army Airfield, 4 June 1943 – 26 February 1944

- 406th Bombardment Squadron, 25 July-13 August 1943 (B-24 Liberator)

==== Aleutians Campaign ====
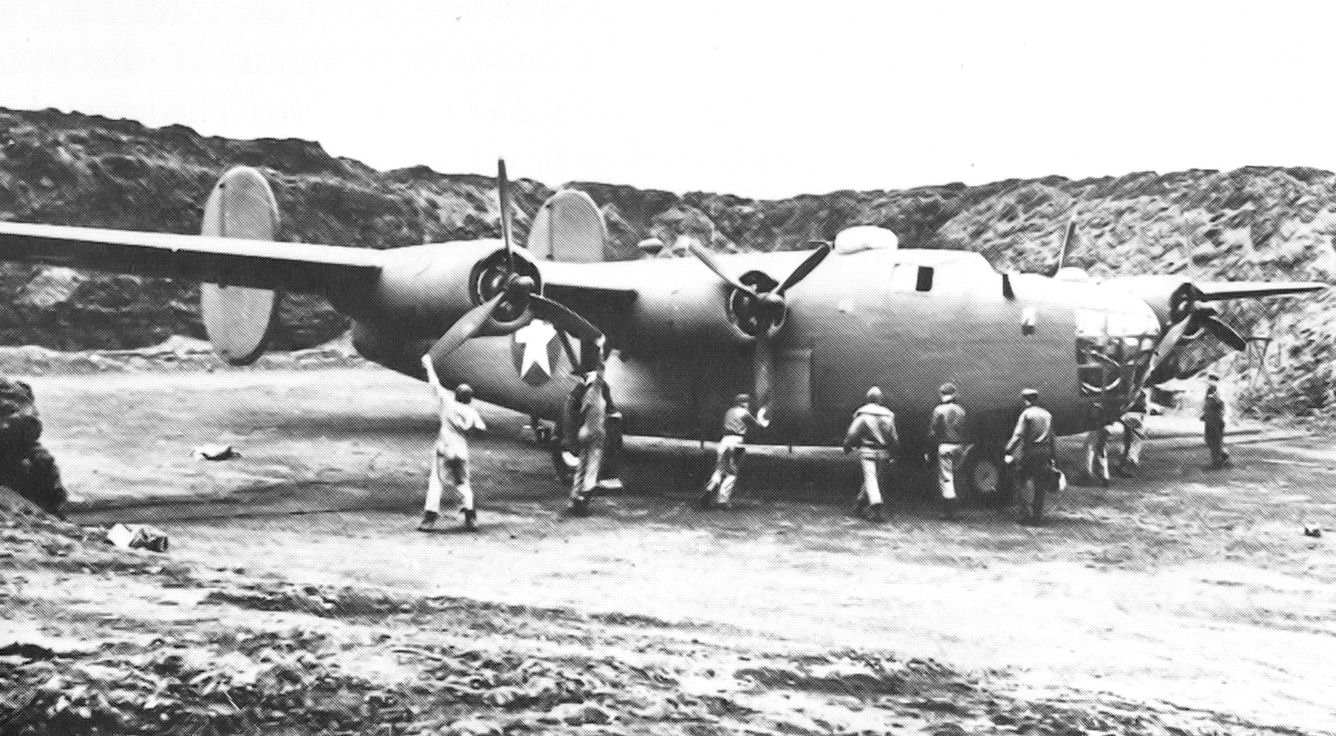
A 36th Bomb Squadron B-24 Liberator at Adak AAF, 1942

By 13 September, enough construction had been completed at Adak to justify the movement of operations from Fort Glenn AAF on Umnak to the new airfield which was 400 miles closer to the Japanese forces on Kiska. The 250-mile distance from Adak allowed multiple combat sorties each day to be carried out, weather permitting. This was particularly true for the fighters, which were now within easy striking range of enemy targets. Previously, only the long-range P-38s had been able to reach Kiska from Fort Glenn AAF, and only with great difficulty. The Japanese forces on Attu, (430 miles from Adak) remained only within the range of the B-24 Liberators, although the P-38s could fly escort missions. With the movement of combat operations to Adak, Fort Glenn and Fort Randall AAF at Cold Bay became support and staging airfields supporting the front line.

On 14 September 1942, the first major combat mission of the Aleutian Campaign from Adak occurred, when thirteen B-24 Liberators and one B-17 Flying Fortress, supported by fourteen P-38 Lightnings, fourteen P-40 Warhawks and seven P-39 Airacobras attacked Kiska harbor. Instead of coming in at high altitudes, the attack was a low-level sweep over the water that caught the Japanese defenses off-guard. The P-39s came in first to suppress the anti-aircraft fire with their 37mm cannon fire. The P-40s then strafed the harbor, attacking the Nakajima A6M2-N "Rufe" float plane fighter/bombers.

After the fighters, the heavy bombers attacked, also at low level, dropping 1,000 bombs on the harbor installations. The Eleventh Air force lost two P-38s in an airborne collision and claimed five Japanese aircraft shot down. Several cargo ships and minesweepers were hit, with the harbor facilities and float planes taking a considerable beating. It was a month before the Japanese could send out a reconnaissance aircraft from Kiska to fly over Adak. Although the Americans were not aware of it at the time, this raid essentially ended the ability of the Japanese to send out offensive strikes from Kiska, and so effectively crippled the facility that the Japanese began withdrawing their shipping from the harbor. The Japanese garrison dug in and began to practice anti-aircraft drills.

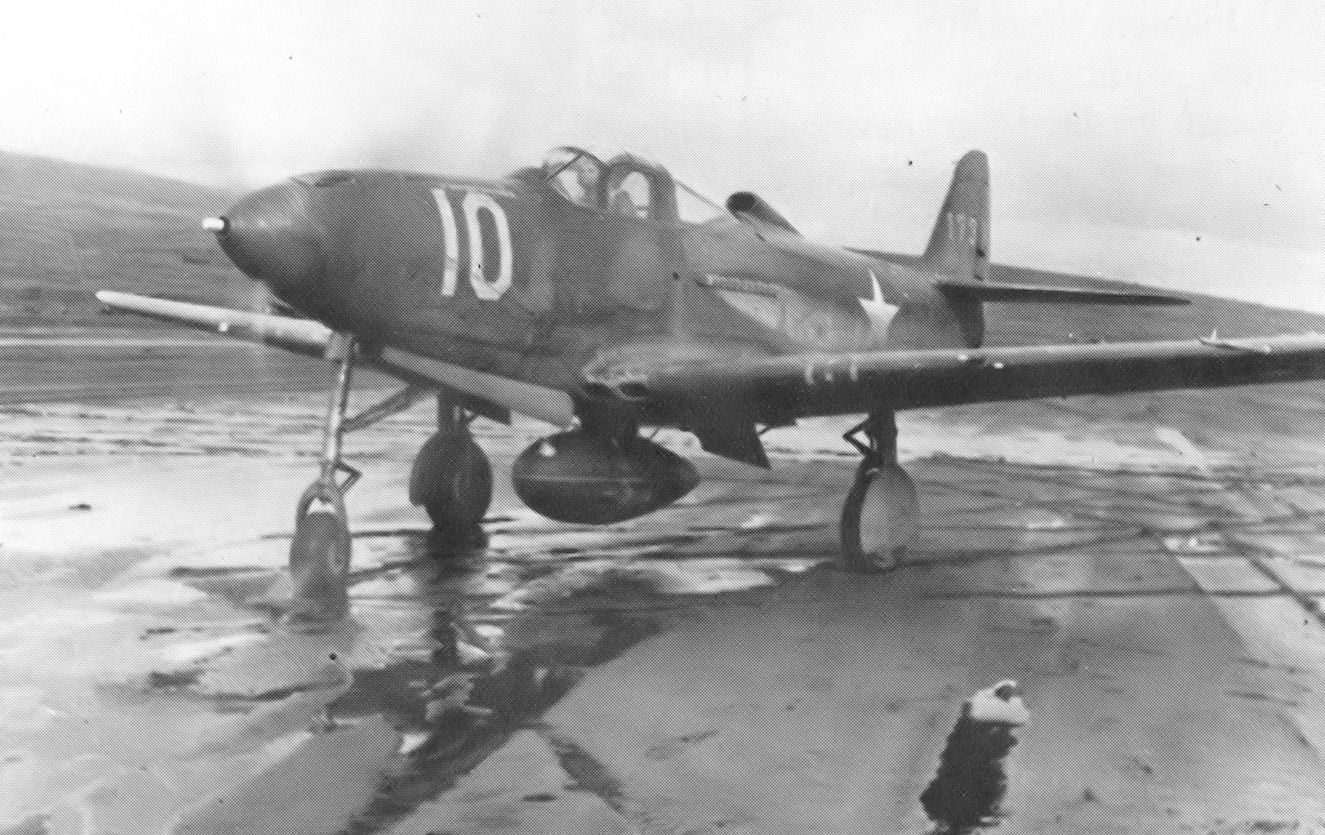
A 42d Fighter Squadron P-39E Airacobra at Adak AAF

Attacks continued against Kiska with high intensity through the fall and end of 1942. Japanese operations from Kiska consisted of a few reconnaissance missions over Adak or a nuisance bombing mission where an aircraft would drop one or two bombs without causing any significant damage. By the end of October, the Japanese had decided to pull out most of its garrison to Attu, which they believed was worth retaining, and began transporting additional units from Hokkaido to Attu and began upgrading their defenses.

On 12 January 1943, American forces made an unopposed landing on Amchitka Island, 50 miles from Kiska and 260 miles from Attu. The Army began establishing a forward combat airfield (A-3) on the island. Aircraft from Adak flew constant combat air patrols over Amchitka against attacking Japanese Rufe fighter-bombers from Kiska and longer-range bombers from Attu.

On 16 February, the construction of the runway at Amchitka AAF had progressed to the point where light fighters could be brought in. 18th Fighter Squadron P-40 Warhawks began to arrive from Adak and surprised the Japanese by launching counterattacks to their raids. Two Japanese light bombers were shot down over the airfield in full view of the construction engineers. Several P-38 Lightnings were moved up to the new airfield.

With the second combat airfield operational and within striking range of the Japanese garrison on Attu, the Japanese forces on Kiska were put into an untenable situation. From its bases on Amchitka and Adak, the Eleventh Air Force conducted continual bombing raids on the Japanese on Kiska and Attu. Additional long-range B-24 Liberator heavy bombers were moved down from mainland Alaskan bases to operate in the Aleutians, which enabled Air Force commanders to send the bombers with full loads to Attu, while North American B-25 Mitchell and Martin B-26 Marauder medium bombers attacked Kiska several times each day. Air support for the Battle of Attu, which took place from 11 to 30 May 1943 was carried out primarily from Amchitka. The battle, which lasted for more than two weeks, ended when most of the Japanese defenders were killed in brutal hand-to-hand combat after a final banzai charge broke through American lines.

On 15 August 1943, U.S. forces landed unopposed on Kiska. Due to the heavy casualties suffered at Attu Island, planners were expecting another costly operation. However, the incessant and continual air attacks had reduced the Japanese forces defenses considerably and the Japanese tactical planners had realized the isolated island was no longer defensible and evacuated its garrison. On 24 August 1943, the Aleutian Islands campaign was successfully completed.

==== Later operations ====
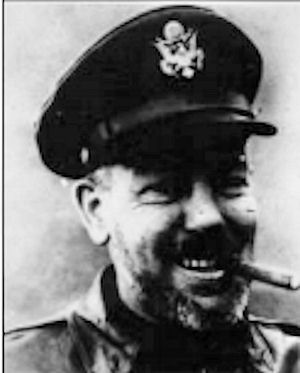
Col Everett S. Davis

On 10 September 1943, Funeral Services for Col Everett S. Davis, former Chief of Staff, Eleventh Air Force, were held on Fort Richardson and he was buried in the Fort Richardson Cemetery. His C-53 had crashed into a mountainside near Naknek on 28 November 1942. The wreckage was found later in 1943. Adak Army Airfield was renamed "Davis Army Airfield" in honor of Colonel Davis.

With the removal of Japanese forces from the Aleutians, the Joint Chiefs of Staff acknowledged the importance of the islands. They also ordered the reduction of the number of combat forces under Eleventh Air Force. Additional airfields were established at Alexai Point on Attu and on Shemya with a mission to carry out very long range B-24 Liberator strikes on the Kurile Islands, but otherwise, the Aleutians became the forgotten front.

Headquarters, Eleventh Air Force was moved to Adak in August 1943 to provide operational control of the raids against the Kurile Islands. Assignments to the Aleutians, however, were looked on with dread. There were no South Pacific Beaches, Piccadilly Circuses, or the warmth of Southern Italy. Adak, Amchatka, Attu, Shemya and the other airfields were cold, damp, and had very few recreational diversions, or things to do. Fighter aircraft flew a dull routine of defensive alerts against an enemy which was a thousand miles away. Other than the B-24 operations against Japan, the remainder of Eleventh Air Force personnel simply counted the days until their reassignment elsewhere.

=== Davis Air Force Base ===
On 18 December 1945, Davis Army Airfield was transferred to Alaskan Air Command when the Eleventh Air Force was inactivated. Initially Davis AAF was Headquarters of AAC until it was moved to Elmendorf Field on 1 October 1946. The mission of Davis AAF, later Air Force Base, became the air defense of the Aleutian Islands. The host unit was designated as the 5020th Air Base Squadron. P-61 Black Widow night fighters of the 415th Night Fighter Squadron were assigned from Shaw AFB, South Carolina and were used as long-range interceptors against incoming unknown aircraft. The 625th Aircraft Control and Warning Squadron, designated F-11, provided early-warning ground control intercept (GCI) Radar to direct the Black Widows to incoming aircraft.

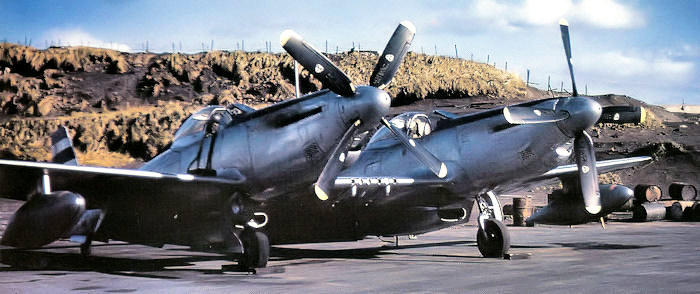
One of four F-82Es deployed by the 27th Fighter Escort Wing to Davis AFB, Aleutians to assist in the transition of the 449th Fighter (All-Weather) Squadron from P-61 Black Widows to the Twin Mustang.

In September 1947, the 415th was replaced by the 449th Fighter Squadron. They were later re-equipped with new F-82H Twin Mustang interceptors and being re-designated as the 449th Fighter Squadron All Weather on 20 July 1948. With the long-range Radar-Equipped Twin Mustangs operating from Davis, AAC moved the 625th AC&W Squadron to Elmendorf AFB on 1 July 1948 where it was attached to the 57th Fighter Wing.

In May 1949, AAC Operations ceased at Davis due to a lack of personnel and consolidation of AAC resources on the mainland. The 449th FS was moved to Ladd AFB and the base was put into a caretaker status. Housekeeping by the 5020th ABS took place and remaining personnel coordinated the transfer of the facility to the Navy. The runway remained open to transient aircraft, but on 30 June 1950 the base was officially closed by the Air Force.

=== Naval Air Facility Adak ===
On 1 July 1950, the Air Force transferred Davis AFB to the United States Navy who established an anti-submarine warfare base there. Adak was most recently run by the U.S. Navy as a deployment base for P-3 Orion maritime patrol aircraft, primarily to conduct antisubmarine warfare operations against submarines and surveillance of naval surface vessels of the Soviet Union. The Naval Air Facility was also reported to be used as a refueling stop for U-2, Dragon Lady, ultra-high altitude reconnaissance aircraft. By the 1980s there were over 6,000 Navy personnel on the islands.

With the fall of the Soviet Union in the early 1990s, NAS Adak's operational viability as a front-line military installation began to wane, and in the mid-1990s a decision was made by the federal government to cease military flight operations there under the military's Base Realignment and Closure Program (BRAC).

On 31 March 1997, the Navy closed Adak Naval Air Facility. Captain Keith Mulder, USN served as the final Commanding Officer of NAF Adak. The lowering of the flag for the last time ended an era that began of 31 August 1942, when U.S. forces landed on the Aleutian Island and established an advance base there for operations against the Japanese on Kiska and Attu Islands. The Navy left behind a contingent of 30 Navy personnel and 200 civilian contractors to maintain facilities, keep the runway open and begin an environmental cleanup.

The station was designated a National Historic Landmark and listed on the National Register of Historic Places in 1987 for its role in the Second World War, even though little remained of the period facilities.

=== Naval Facility (NAVFAC) Adak ===
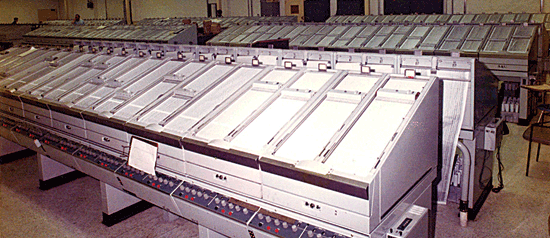
Lofargram writers on the NAVFAC watch floor

On 1 December 1962 the Sound Surveillance System (SOSUS) shore terminal was commissioned. It was a secretive separate command, though supported by the larger base.

Of some note was the detection of highly classified U.S. submarine operations off the Soviet submarine base at Petropavlovsk despite a belief among some submariners the system could not pick up U.S. submarines. The array at Adak twice caused significant awareness SOSUS could. In 1962 NAVFAC Adak contact reports went to Commander, Alaskan Sea Frontier and that command published a secret report containing the Petropavlovsk contacts presuming they were Soviet.

Commander, Submarine Force, U.S. Pacific Fleet (COMSUBPAC) recognized the contacts as their very highly classified operations and immediate changes were ordered for the reporting procedures. In 1973 such contacts were again almost published and stopped only when contact information was matched, on advice by a visiting civilian expert who recognized the signatures, by NAVFAC people to one of the submarine's logs when that submarine put into Adak for a medical emergency.

In 1968, a tap on the Adak array for the Air Force Technical Applications Center (AFTAC), a nuclear event monitoring system, combined with AFTAC hydrophones in the Pacific provided time delay analysis for localizing the GOLF II Class Soviet SSB K-129 loss. That location provided the information leading to Project Azorian and the attempt to raise the lost submarine.

The Base Realignment and Closure (BRAC) directed closure of the Naval Air Facility and dictate that no military facilities could remain on the island forced the closing of NAVFAC Adak; the only SOSUS facility closed directly as a result of BRAC. Acoustic data from the Adak array was routed to the Naval Ocean Processing Facility Whidbey Island (a tenant of Naval Air Station Whidbey Island) and the Adak facility was decommissioned on 30 September 1992 after thirty years of surveillance.

== Education ==
Adak Region School District served dependents living on the base.

== Demographics ==
Historical population
Census	Pop.	Note	%±
1970	2,249		—
1980	3,315		47.4%
1990	4,633		39.8%
U.S. Decennial Census

Adak Naval Station first appeared on the 1970 U.S. Census as an unincorporated military installation. It was made a census-designated place (CDP) in 1980. The station was deactivated in 1997 and was superseded by the CDP of Adak in 2000.

== See also ==
- Alaska World War II Army Airfields
- List of National Historic Landmarks in Alaska
- List of Superfund sites in Alaska
- List of United States Navy airfields
- National Register of Historic Places listings in Aleutians West Census Area, Alaska
