= Sand Point, Alaska =

City in Alaska, United States

- City
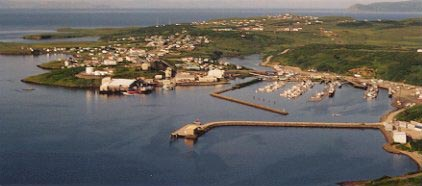
- Sand Point from the air

- Seal

- Location in Alaska Sand Point, Alaska (North America)
- Coordinates: 55°20′12″N 160°29′36″W
- Country: United States
- State: Alaska
- Borough: Aleutians East
- Incorporated: September 1, 1966

Government
  - Type: Mayor/Council
  - Mayor: James Smith
  - Borough mayor: Alvin D. Osterback
  - State senator: Lyman Hoffman (D)
  - State rep.: Bryce Edgmon (I)

Area
  - Total: 30.29 sq mi (78.46 km^{2})
  - Land: 8.01 sq mi (20.75 km^{2})
  - Water: 22.28 sq mi (57.71 km^{2})
- Elevation: 39 ft (12 m)

Population (2020)
  - Total: 578
  - Density: 72.2/sq mi (27.86/km^{2})
- Time zone: UTC-9 (Alaska (AKST))
  - Summer (DST): UTC-8 (AKDT)
- ZIP code: 99661
- Area code: 907
- FIPS code: 02-67020
- GNIS feature ID: 1419182
- Website: sandpointak.com

Sand Point, also known as Popof Island, is a city in Aleutians East Borough, Alaska, United States. At the 2010 census the population was 976, up from 952 in 2000, but by the 2020 Census this had reduced to 578. It is on northwestern Popof Island, one of the Shumagin Islands, off the Alaska Peninsula. It is the borough seat of Aleutians East Borough, and is near the entrance to the Bering Sea.

The Aleutians East Borough School District is in Southwestern Alaska along the Alaska Peninsula and Aleutian Chain The District was formed in 1988 from smaller districts that consolidated and formed a Borough with taxing authority. The Borough and District boundaries are the same, and stretch over approximately 15,000 square miles (39,000 km^{2}) of roadless, mostly treeless tundra, from the middle of the Alaska Peninsula to the north and east, going southwest out to Akutan just east of Dutch Harbor.

== History ==
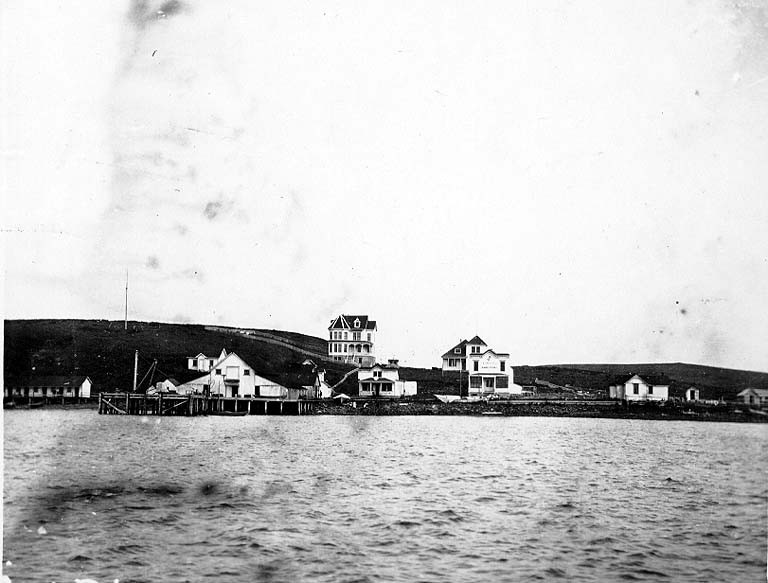
Undated photograph of Sand Point by John Nathan Cobb

Sand Point was founded by a San Francisco fishing company in 1898 as a cod fishing station and trading post. Aleuts and Scandinavians were among the early residents. Gold mining was briefly a part of the economy during the early 1900s. Fishing remains an important industry, as Sand Point is home to one of the largest fishing fleets in the Aleutian Chain.

== Description ==
Almost half the inhabitants are of Aleut descent— mainly from the Qagan Tayagungin tribe— who support themselves by fishing and fish processing. There is a cold storage and fish-processing plant owned and operated by Trident Seafoods, and Peter Pan had a support facility, now closed. There is an airport with a 5,200 feet (1,600 m) paved runway and daily flights (weather permitting) to Anchorage, 575 nautical miles (1,100 km) to the northeast.

The town is above the treeline, and there is a small herd of 120 bison (first introduced in the 1930s) which provides some meat for the island's inhabitants. It is notorious for the high winds caused by the meeting of cold air flows from the Bering Sea with the warm air over the Japan Current. It has a maritime climate, with temperature averages ranging from −9 to 76 °F (−23 to 24 °C), an average snowfall of 52 inches (130 cm) and an average rainfall of 33 inches (84 cm).

The Russian Orthodox St. Nicholas Chapel was built in Sand Point in 1933.

== Demographics ==
Historical population
Census	Pop.	Note	%±
1900	16		—
1920	60		—
1930	69		15.0%
1940	99		43.5%
1950	107		8.1%
1960	254		137.4%
1970	360		41.7%
1980	625		73.6%
1990	878		40.5%
2000	952		8.4%
2010	976		2.5%
2020	578		−40.8%
U.S. Decennial Census

Sand Point first appeared on the 1890 U.S. Census as the Sand Point Station under Popof Island, but did not report a separate figure (the total population for the island and docked ships was 146). It first reported a separate figure in 1900 as Sand Point. It did not appear on the 1910 census, but returned in 1920 and in every successive census. It formally incorporated in 1966 and with the formation of the Aleutians East Borough in 1987, became the seat of government.

=== 2020 census ===
As of the 2020 census, Sand Point had a population of 578. The median age was 37.4 years. 24.4% of residents were under the age of 18 and 11.2% of residents were 65 years of age or older. For every 100 females there were 130.3 males, and for every 100 females age 18 and over there were 133.7 males age 18 and over.

0.0% of residents lived in urban areas, while 100.0% lived in rural areas.

There were 215 households in Sand Point, of which 36.7% had children under the age of 18 living in them. Of all households, 34.4% were married-couple households, 34.4% were households with a male householder and no spouse or partner present, and 17.7% were households with a female householder and no spouse or partner present. About 25.2% of all households were made up of individuals and 9.3% had someone living alone who was 65 years of age or older.

There were 280 housing units, of which 23.2% were vacant. The homeowner vacancy rate was 0.0% and the rental vacancy rate was 13.1%.

Racial composition as of the 2020 census
Race	Number	Percent
White	111	19.2%
Black or African American	0	0.0%
American Indian and Alaska Native	342	59.2%
Asian	53	9.2%
Native Hawaiian and Other Pacific Islander	10	1.7%
Some other race	9	1.6%
Two or more races	53	9.2%
Hispanic or Latino (of any race)	16	2.8%

=== 2000 census ===
As of the 2000 census, there were 952 people, 229 households, and 155 families residing in the city. The population density was 122.1 inhabitants per square mile (47.1/km^{2}). There were 282 housing units at an average density of 36.2 units per square mile (14.0 units/km^{2}). The racial makeup of the city was 27.73% White, 1.47% Black or African American, 42.33% Native American, 23.21% Asian, 0.32% Pacific Islander, 2.21% from other races, and 2.73% from two or more races. 13.55% of the population were Hispanic or Latino of any race.

There were 229 households, out of which 39.3% had children under the age of 18 living with them, 45.4% were married couples living together, 15.7% had a female householder with no husband present, and 31.9% were non-families. 25.8% of all households were made up of individuals, and 3.9% had someone living alone who was 65 years of age or older. The average household size was 2.67 and the average family size was 3.17.

In the city, the age distribution of the population shows 20.4% under the age of 18, 8.6% from 18 to 24, 41.5% from 25 to 44, 26.3% from 45 to 64, and 3.3% who were 65 years of age or older. The median age was 36 years. For every 100 females, there were 165.2 males. For every 100 females age 18 and over, there were 181.8 males.

The median income for a household in the city was $55,417, and the median income for a family was $58,000. Males had a median income of $20,000 versus $22,500 for females. The per capita income for the city was $21,954. About 10.3% of families and 16.0% of the population were below the poverty line, including 14.4% of those under age 18 and 32.1% of those age 65 or over.

== Climate ==
Like all of Southwest Alaska, Sand Point has a subpolar oceanic climate (Köppen Cfc), or a subarctic climate (Köppen Dfc) using the 0 °C isotherm common in the United States, though compared to most parts of the region it is a little less rainy and has fewer wet days –145 as compared to over 220 throughout the Aleutian Islands and in most of Southeast Alaska.

Climate data for Sand Point, Alaska (1991–2020 normals, (Note: Mean monthly maxima and minima (i.e. the highest and lowest temperature readings during an entire month or year) calculated based on data at said location from 1991 to 2020.) extremes 1941–present (Note: Temperature extremes from 1941 to 1994 are recorded by WRCC, and extreme values from 2009 to the present are recorded by NOAA.))
Month	Jan	Feb	Mar	Apr	May	Jun	Jul	Aug	Sep	Oct	Nov	Dec	Year
Record high °F (°C)	48 (9)	56 (13)	50 (10)	56 (13)	62 (17)	77 (25)	71 (22)	72 (22)	64 (18)	57 (14)	54 (12)	52 (11)	77 (25)
Mean maximum °F (°C)	42.5 (5.8)	42.7 (5.9)	43.7 (6.5)	49.3 (9.6)	55.4 (13.0)	63.7 (17.6)	65.0 (18.3)	65.3 (18.5)	60.4 (15.8)	53.8 (12.1)	48.7 (9.3)	44.8 (7.1)	67.4 (19.7)
Mean daily maximum °F (°C)	35.2 (1.8)	34.9 (1.6)	34.7 (1.5)	39.5 (4.2)	45.5 (7.5)	51.9 (11.1)	56.1 (13.4)	57.0 (13.9)	53.4 (11.9)	45.5 (7.5)	40.1 (4.5)	36.5 (2.5)	44.2 (6.8)
Daily mean °F (°C)	30.9 (−0.6)	31.4 (−0.3)	30.8 (−0.7)	35.3 (1.8)	40.9 (4.9)	47.2 (8.4)	51.4 (10.8)	52.5 (11.4)	48.7 (9.3)	41.2 (5.1)	36.4 (2.4)	32.7 (0.4)	39.9 (4.4)
Mean daily minimum °F (°C)	26.6 (−3.0)	27.9 (−2.3)	27.0 (−2.8)	31.1 (−0.5)	36.2 (2.3)	42.5 (5.8)	46.6 (8.1)	48.1 (8.9)	44.0 (6.7)	36.9 (2.7)	32.6 (0.3)	28.9 (−1.7)	35.7 (2.1)
Mean minimum °F (°C)	17.1 (−8.3)	15.2 (−9.3)	15.2 (−9.3)	21.1 (−6.1)	29.7 (−1.3)	37.2 (2.9)	42.0 (5.6)	42.8 (6.0)	36.8 (2.7)	31.1 (−0.5)	24.8 (−4.0)	18.0 (−7.8)	9.8 (−12.3)
Record low °F (°C)	−12 (−24)	3 (−16)	6 (−14)	8 (−13)	12 (−11)	30 (−1)	34 (1)	36 (2)	25 (−4)	24 (−4)	14 (−10)	9 (−13)	−12 (−24)
Average precipitation inches (mm)	3.99 (101)	4.43 (113)	2.41 (61)	2.64 (67)	4.01 (102)	3.10 (79)	2.93 (74)	3.89 (99)	4.95 (126)	4.97 (126)	5.09 (129)	6.51 (165)	48.92 (1,243)
Average snowfall inches (cm)	5.6 (14)	1.8 (4.6)	1.5 (3.8)	0.8 (2.0)	0 (0)	0 (0)	0 (0)	0 (0)	0 (0)	0 (0)	1.2 (3.0)	2.0 (5.1)	12.9 (33)
Average precipitation days (≥ 0.01 inch)	20.1	17.3	14.1	17.4	18.2	13.1	14.8	15.0	17.2	19.5	20.1	22.5	209.3
Source 1: NOAA
Source 2: WRCC (Snowfall)

== Culture ==
Sand Point is a mixed Native and non-Native community. More than 50% of the permanent residents in Sand Point are known as Aleuts or Unangan. Every July the town hosts a Culture Camp in which Aleut traditions such as dance, sewing Aleut dresses, playing drums, building kayaks, knot tying, and weaving are taught. Culture Camp has an Aleut language component built into the program.

== Geography ==
According to the U.S. Census Bureau, the city has a total area of 28.9 square miles (75 km^{2}), of which, 7.8 square miles (20 km^{2}) of it is land and 21.1 square miles (55 km^{2}) of it (73.05%) is water.

== Education ==
There is one school, the Sand Point School, operated by the Aleutians East Borough School District (AEBSD).

There are approximately one hundred students in the Sand Point School. In addition to classroom space, the school houses a library media center, gymnasium, weight room, indoor pool and shop. The Sand Point School is part of the Aleutians East Borough School District. The superintendent of the AEBSD is Dr. Doug Conboy and the principal of the Sand Point School is Joseph VonDoloski Sr. Circa 1978 the school, then a part of the Aleutian Region School District, had a 13 teachers, and 136 students.

== Transportation ==
Ravn Alaska offers flights from Anchorage to Sand Point four days a week. The two-hour flight costs more than $500 for a round-trip ticket.

Cargo service to Sand Point is available on Alaska Central Express (ACE) Air Cargo. ACE Air Cargo flies to Sand Point several days a week. Coastal Transportation is a Seattle-based marine carrier that provides weekly year-around service to communities throughout the Aleutians, including Sand Point.

During the summer and into the fall, the Alaska Marine Highway operates the Tustumena. The Tustumena stops in Sand Point eight times per year. From Sand Point the ferry goes to King Cove, Cold Bay, False Pass and Dutch Harbor. The ship has staterooms and dining room service. The ferry takes cars and trucks. As of 2017 ferry delays have been common.

== Wind Power ==
In 2012, two .5MW wind turbines were installed with blade diameters of 19.5 meters and a height of 59.5 meters.

== Fishing industry ==
Like most Aleutian communities, commercial fishing drives the local economy. The Aleutians' largest fishing fleet is based in Sand Point. Trident Seafoods has a major Pacific cod, pollock, salmon and halibut processing plant, and provides fuel and other services. Peter Pan Seafoods owns a storage and transfer facility. In 1991, New West Fisheries had a floating processor near the city dock for Pacific cod processing. Residents in Sand Point have to acquire commercial fishing permits to participate in the fisheries.

The city completed a major rehabilitation of the Robert E. Galovin Small Boat Harbor in the summer of 2014. The harbor can hold more than 150 boats in permanent slips, as well as transient vessels. There is also a new boat harbor on the waterfront next to the small boat harbor and City dock. This harbor was built by the Borough and Army Corps of Engineers, but does not have any floats.

== Media ==
=== Radio ===
- KSDP 830 AM (Local NPR and APRN affiliate) (non-commercial community service)
