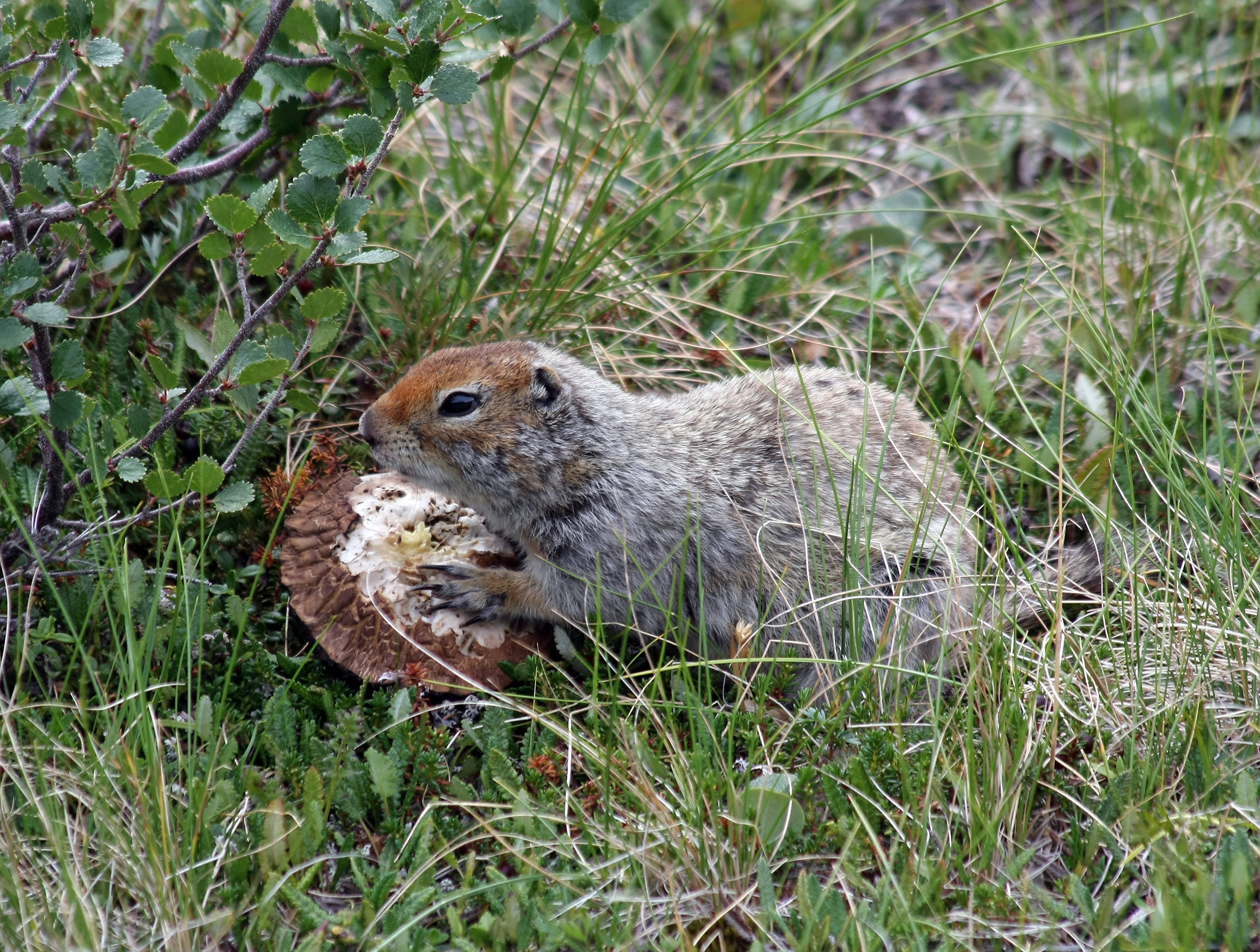

Conservation status
- Least Concern (IUCN 3.1)

Scientific classification
- Kingdom: Animalia
- Phylum: Chordata
- Class: Mammalia
- Order: Rodentia
- Family: Sciuridae
- Genus: Urocitellus
- Species: U. parryii

Binomial name
- Urocitellus parryii (Richardson, 1825)

Subspecies
- 10 ssp., see text

Synonyms
- Spermophilus parryii

= Arctic ground squirrel =

Species of rodent

The Arctic ground squirrel (Urocitellus parryii) (Inuktitut: ᓯᒃᓯᒃ, siksik) is a species of ground squirrel in the squirrel family Sciuridae that is native to the Arctic and Subarctic regions of the Northern Hemisphere, mainly in North America and Asia. It is the largest species in the genus Urocitellus, its range extends farther north than that of any other squirrel, and it is the only member of the squirrel family with a Holarctic distribution. For some people in Alaska, particularly around the Aleutian Islands, the rodents are known as "parka" squirrels, likely due to their pelts being used for the ruff on parkas and other cold-weather clothing.

== Taxonomy ==
Subspecies listed alphabetically.

- U. p. ablusus Osgood, 1903
- U. p. kennicottii Ross, 1861: Barrow ground squirrel (Northern Alaska, N. Yukon and N. Northwest Territories)
- U. p. kodiacensis Ross, 1861: Kodiak Island ground squirrel
- U. p. leucostictus Brandt, 1844
- U. p. lyratus Hall and Gilmore, 1932: St. Lawrence Island ground squirrel
- U. p. nebulicola Osgood, 1903: Shumagin Islands ground squirrel (Aleutians East Borough; islands of Koniuji, Korovin, Nagai, Popof, Simeonof, Unga)
- U. p. osgoodi Merriam, 1900: Osgood's Arctic ground squirrel (south of the Brooks Range in Alaska, near Fort Yukon and Circle)
- U. p. parryii Richardson, 1825
- U. p. plesius Osgood, 1900 (southeastern Alaska, Yukon, western Northwest Territories and northern British Columbia)
- U. p. stejnegeri J. A. Allen, 1903

The species was long placed in the genus Spermophilus. A 2009 generic revision of the Holarctic ground squirrels, prompted by molecular evidence that Spermophilus as then defined was paraphyletic, moved it to Urocitellus.

Phylogeographic studies of mitochondrial DNA have identified geographically distinct clades within the species. An Arctic clade occupies Arctic and subarctic populations north of the Yukon River in northern Alaska and Canada, while a Southeast clade, which includes U. p. plesius, occurs south of the Yukon River in south-central Alaska and western Canada; further clades occur in western and southwestern Alaska and on the Bering Sea islands. A 2026 ancient DNA study of Pleistocene squirrel droppings from the Klondike found that U. parryii mitochondrial lineages do not form a single group, and its authors concluded that the current taxonomy of the species is not monophyletic and called for nuclear genomic work to resolve it.

== Description ==
The Arctic ground squirrel typically has a beige-tan pelage with a lightly spotted backside. Similar to the related prairie dog, it has a shorter face than the typical arboreal squirrels, due to its lifestyle of burrowing, as well as smaller ears, with a dark tail and white markings around the eyes. Small populations of melanistic (entirely black) Arctic ground squirrels occur in Yukon, including one at Jake's Corner on the Alaska Highway.

Arctic ground squirrels molt twice a year, in spring after emerging from hibernation and in fall before hibernating. The underparts are largely buff tawny in summer and turn lighter with the fall molt. The average length of an Arctic ground squirrel is approximately 39 cm (15 in). Since Arctic ground squirrels undergo drastic seasonal changes in body mass, often doubling their weight over the summer before entering hibernation, it is difficult to give an average mass; males average about 800 g (28 oz) and females about 700 g (25 oz).

== Distribution and habitat ==
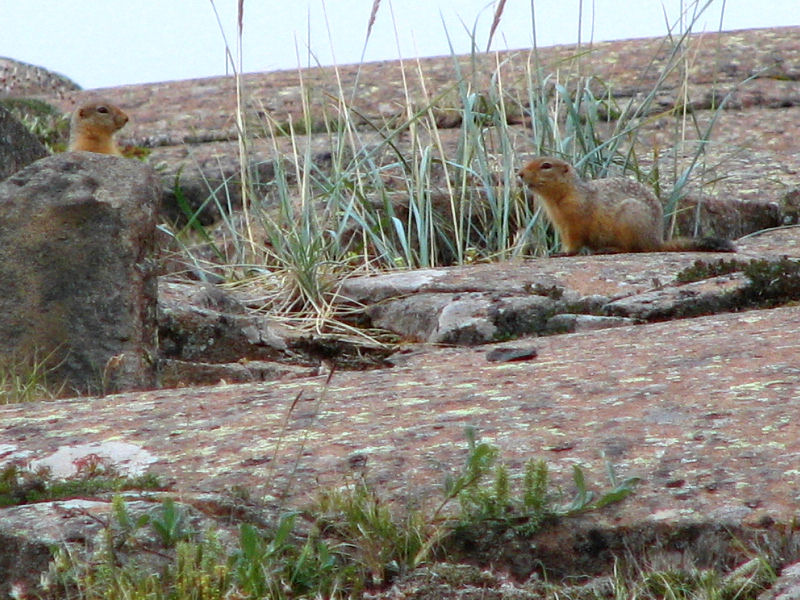
On tundra, Kugluktuk, Nunavut

The Arctic ground squirrel can be found in parts of western Northern Canada, from the Arctic Circle to the Yukon, northern British Columbia and the Northwest Territories; west into Alaska, the Alaska Peninsula, the Aleutian Islands archipelago, and across to the Russian Far East (Siberia), including the Kamchatka Peninsula. In North America its range extends from the west coast of Hudson Bay to the west coast of Alaska. The St. Lawrence Island subspecies (U. p. lyratus) of Arctic ground squirrel is found on its namesake island in the Bering Sea; the Kodiak Island subspecies (U. p. kodiacensis) is found on Kodiak. Several island populations near the Alaska Peninsula, including some in the Kodiak Archipelago and the Semidi and Shumagin Islands, may have been introduced by people who valued the pelts, and introduced populations are confirmed on Kavalga, Unalaska and Amaknak in the Aleutians.

The Arctic ground squirrel is found on tundra across its range; depending on the subspecies, its preferred habitats are typically hillside or mountain slopes, riparian areas (such as river flats, banks or lake shores) or tundra ridges. Arctic ground squirrels prefer to live in sandy soil due to its ease of manipulation for burrowing, and its superior drainage as opposed to richer soils. Arctic ground squirrels make shallow tunnels and burrows in locations where the permafrost will not prevent them from digging; their hibernation dens lie about 100 cm (39 in) below the surface, and they require at least that depth of thawed ground to dig them. The more southerly subspecies typically inhabit open meadows and open tundra habitats. Colonies consist of shallow burrow systems, roughly 1 m (3 ft 3 in) deep, that provide refuge from predators and cold and are used for rearing young and for hibernation. Through soil disturbance, selective foraging and food caching, the squirrels strongly influence the vegetation and soils around their colonies. They have been reported to excavate up to 18 tonnes of soil per hectare each year, aerating it and bringing nutrients to the surface.

=== Yukon ===
In Yukon, Arctic ground squirrels are a common sight along highways and hillsides, and the territorial government lists south-facing slopes and tundra as their habitat. Today, populations are largely restricted to isolated open ground in southern and northern Yukon; the species is absent from the area around the Klondike goldfields, where permafrost lies too close to the surface for burrowing.

Unusually for the species, its range in Yukon extends into the montane boreal forest, the only part of Canada's boreal forest it inhabits. In the Kluane region of southwest Yukon, it occupies three distinct habitat types: boreal forest, low-elevation meadows and alpine meadows. Trapping between 2008 and 2010 found late-summer densities of 0.38 squirrels per hectare in boreal forest and 1.25 per hectare in low-elevation meadow. Two of the study grids were inside Kluane National Park and Reserve: a south-facing meadow at about 800 metres (2,600 ft) east of the Slims River delta, and an alpine meadow at about 1,600 metres (5,200 ft) roughly 8 kilometres (5.0 mi) upslope. Alpine densities of about five to six squirrels per hectare in 2008 and 2009 were essentially unchanged from those recorded in 1975 and 1976. A 2008 to 2013 survey of 158 colony sites across about 25,000 square kilometres (9,700 sq mi) of southwest Yukon found occupancy rising with elevation, from about 4% of boreal forest sites to about 93% of alpine sites, with the highest burrow activity in alpine tundra.

In Tombstone Territorial Park in the Ogilvie Mountains of central Yukon, the species is part of the park's mammal fauna. During a 2005 small-mammal survey there, Arctic ground squirrels disabled many traps at alpine ridge and dry alpine tundra sites.

== Fossil record ==
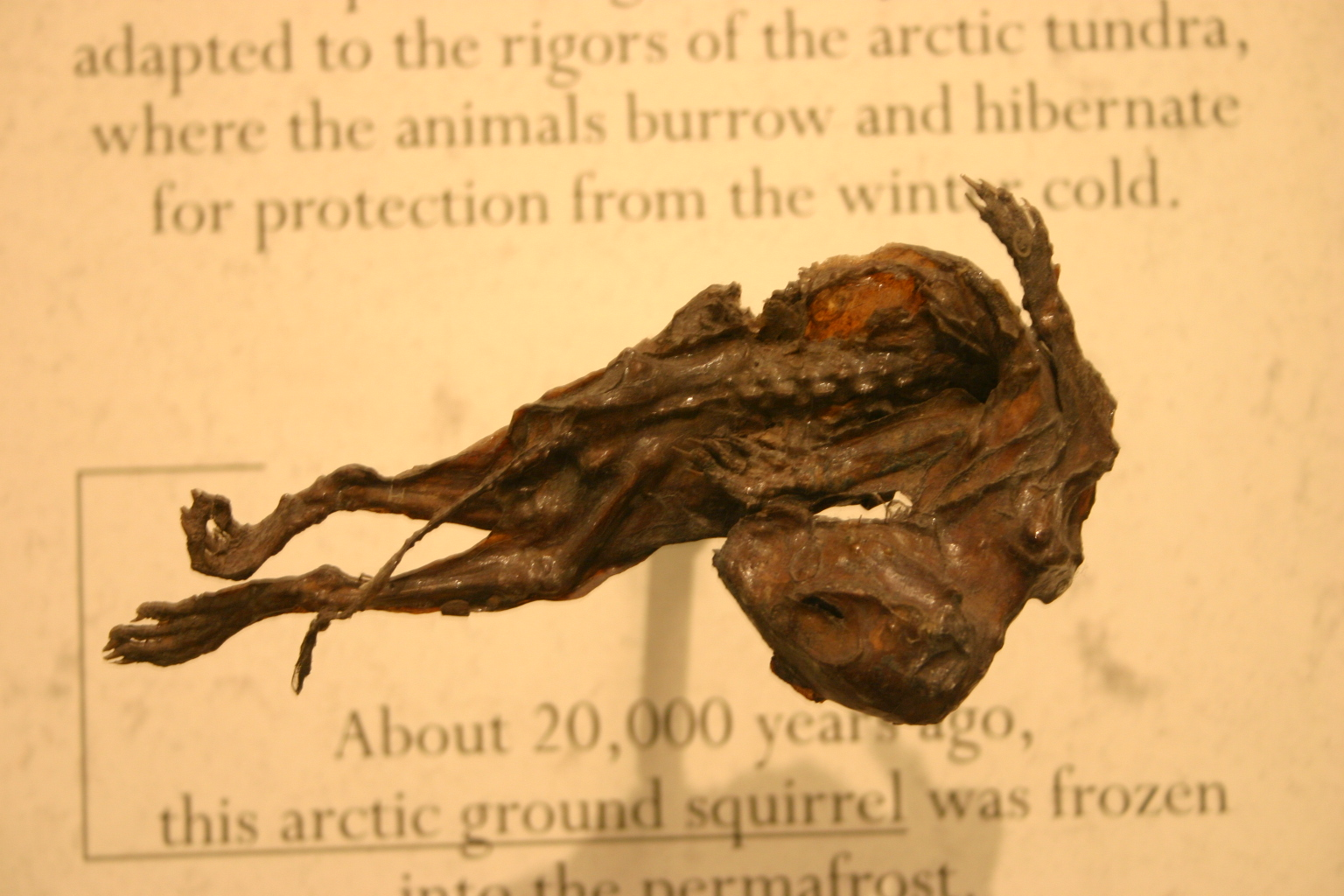
20,000-year-old Arctic ground squirrel mummy

The Arctic ground squirrel has an extensive fossil record from the Pleistocene. During the Last Glacial Maximum, it was abundant in areas such as the Klondike region where it is currently rare or absent. Because shallow permafrost prevents burrowing in the goldfields today, the species' abundance there during cold glacial periods has been described as a counterintuitive puzzle. Fossilised Arctic ground squirrel nests and caches have also been used for palaeoenvironmental reconstruction; Calamagrostis canadensis, Carex albonigra, and Koeleria sp. are common in caches from Late Pleistocene Alaska, indicating the presence of an areally extensive mammoth steppe ecosystem in the region at this time.

Burrows preserved in permafrost in the Klondike region contain fossil droppings (coprolites) ranging from the Holocene to about 700,000 years old. A 2026 study recovered ancient environmental DNA from these droppings, including DNA of plants, insects, woolly mammoths, steppe bison and horses, and reconstructed mitochondrial genomes of the squirrels themselves. The oldest sample, about 700,000 years old, belonged to a previously unrecognized lineage whose closest living relative is the long-tailed ground squirrel of Eurasia. In 2023, Yukon palaeontologists unveiled a mummified Arctic ground squirrel, estimated to be about 30,000 years old, that a placer miner had found curled in a hibernating posture at Hester Creek near Dawson City in 2018.

== Behaviour ==
The diurnal Arctic ground squirrel lives on the tundra, where it may fall prey to the Arctic and the red fox, coyote, wolf, wolverine, Canada and Eurasian lynx, brown bear, ermine, snowy owls, falcons, hawks and eagles; the Yukon government describes its predators as raptors and every carnivore from ermine to grizzly bear. It is one of the few Arctic mammal species which hibernates in the winter, similarly to the little brown bat and the closely related marmot. In the summer, it forages for tundra plants, seeds, and fruit to increase body fat for its winter hibernation. By late summer, the male Arctic ground squirrel begins to store food in its cache so that, come springtime, it will have a food source until new vegetation has grown. In alpine meadows in Yukon, squirrels have been found to cache food selectively. Their burrows are lined with lichens, leaves, grasses, and muskox hair, amongst other animal fibers they may find.

Arctic ground squirrels live in scattered colonies, which allows more individuals to watch for predators; adult males defend small areas against other males. Male territories, established in spring, cover about 0.14 to 2.2 hectares and may include several clusters of related females. Females are philopatric and tend to settle near where they were born, whereas nearly all males disperse within their first year, so colonies consist of groups of related females and immigrant males. Males are infanticidal, and groups of related females may help repel them. Related females in a colony often care for orphaned young, and territorial behaviour lessens in late summer.

Communication between squirrels is done through both vocal and physical means. When they meet, nose to nose contact is made or other body parts are pressed together. Arctic ground squirrels produce six distinct sounds, several of which serve as alarm calls. A squirrel gives a three-note chatter when approached by a ground predator, and a series of five or more fading chatters as it escapes into a burrow when the predator comes close. The approach of an aerial predator draws a single descending whistle, which is repeated at intervals of about six to eight seconds if the predator lands nearby. The species' distinctive alarm cry is the source of its traditional Inuit name, siksik.

An Arctic ground squirrel vocalizing on the slopes of King's Throne Peak in Kluane National Park and Reserve, Yukon, among moss campion and other alpine vegetation

=== Hibernation ===
The Arctic ground squirrel hibernates over winter from early August to late April in adult females and from late September to early April for adult males, although the timing varies between populations, even ones living near each other; in Yukon, the government gives the hibernation period as early October to mid-April. During hibernation it can reduce its body temperatures from 37 °C (99 °F) to as little as −3 °C (27 °F). During hibernation, its core body temperature reaches temperatures down to −2.9 °C (26.8 °F) while its brain is kept just above freezing, which is colder than any other hibernating mammal, and its heart rate drops to about one beat per minute. Peripheral, colonic, and blood temperatures become subzero. Hibernation lasts seven to eight months, but torpor is not continuous. Bouts of lowered metabolism and body temperature lasting up to about three weeks are interrupted every two to three weeks by arousals, during which the squirrel, still asleep, shivers for 12 to 15 hours to rewarm to its normal body temperature before cooling again. One leading explanation for why the squirrel's blood does not freeze is that the animal removes ice nucleators, which are necessary for the development of ice crystals, from its body fluids. In the absence of ice nucleators, body fluids can remain liquid in a supercooled state. This process is being studied with the hope that the mechanism present in Arctic ground squirrels may provide a path for better preservation of human organs for transplant. The connections between brain cells also wither away in this state; research on related species shows that these connections regrow after the animal wakes.

In the warmer months, the squirrel is active during the day, mostly between 5 a.m. and 11 p.m. despite near-constant daylight, and retreats to its burrow at night and in bad weather. Free-living squirrels in Alaska maintain daily rhythms of body temperature throughout the active season, including six weeks of continuous summer daylight, but show no circadian rhythms during hibernation.

A 25-year study at two sites in Arctic Alaska found that climate change has delayed the autumn freezing of the permafrost active layer, and that hibernating squirrels have correspondingly delayed when they increase heat production to avoid freezing. Over the same period, adult females ended hibernation about four days earlier per decade, while males showed no change; the authors noted that continued shifts could alter hibernation energetics, change when the species is available to predators, and disrupt interactions between the sexes.

=== Diet ===
This squirrel feeds on grasses, sedges, mushrooms, bog rushes, bilberries, willows, roots, stalks, leaves, leaf buds, flowers, catkins, and seeds. They will also eat insects and, occasionally, even supplement their diet with carrion (such as mice, snowshoe hares and caribou) as well as juvenile Arctic ground squirrels. Sometimes these squirrels carry food back to their den in their cheeks. Predation on collared lemmings has been recorded in the Northwest Territories, and on St. Lawrence Island squirrels have been reported scavenging walrus and whale meat. On some Alaskan islands they eat the eggs of passerine birds and the eggs and chicks of seabirds.

=== Reproduction ===
During the mating season, males engage in male-male aggressive encounters for mating rights.

Mating occurs between mid-April and mid-May (depending on latitude) after winter hibernation, in a short season within a few days of female emergence. Mating includes male-male competition for access to females. Multiple paternity is common, although the first male to mate with a female usually sires most of her litter. Gestation lasts about 25 to 30 days, and females produce one litter a year of up to ten hairless, blind young, averaging about four. Lactation lasts 28 to 35 days, and within five to six weeks the young reach about 80% of adult weight, rapid growth that prepares them for their first winter. Young become independent and are ready to breed when they emerge from their first hibernation. Mortality in the first year of life is 54 to 74%. Females live longer than males, whose mortality is raised by dispersal, fighting and predation during the mating season, and individuals may live up to eight to ten years in the wild.

== Relationship with humans ==
For First Nations people in Yukon, Arctic ground squirrels were a welcome food when they emerged from hibernation in spring, and were considered at their best in late summer. Women trapped them with snares of twisted sinew, and the pelts were used to make robes and trim ceremonial garments. The squirrels are still hunted by Yukon First Nations as a traditional food. In southwest Yukon, they have remained abundant along the margins of airports and around human habitations, including at Burwash Landing, Haines Junction and Whitehorse, even where nearby natural populations have declined.

== Conservation ==
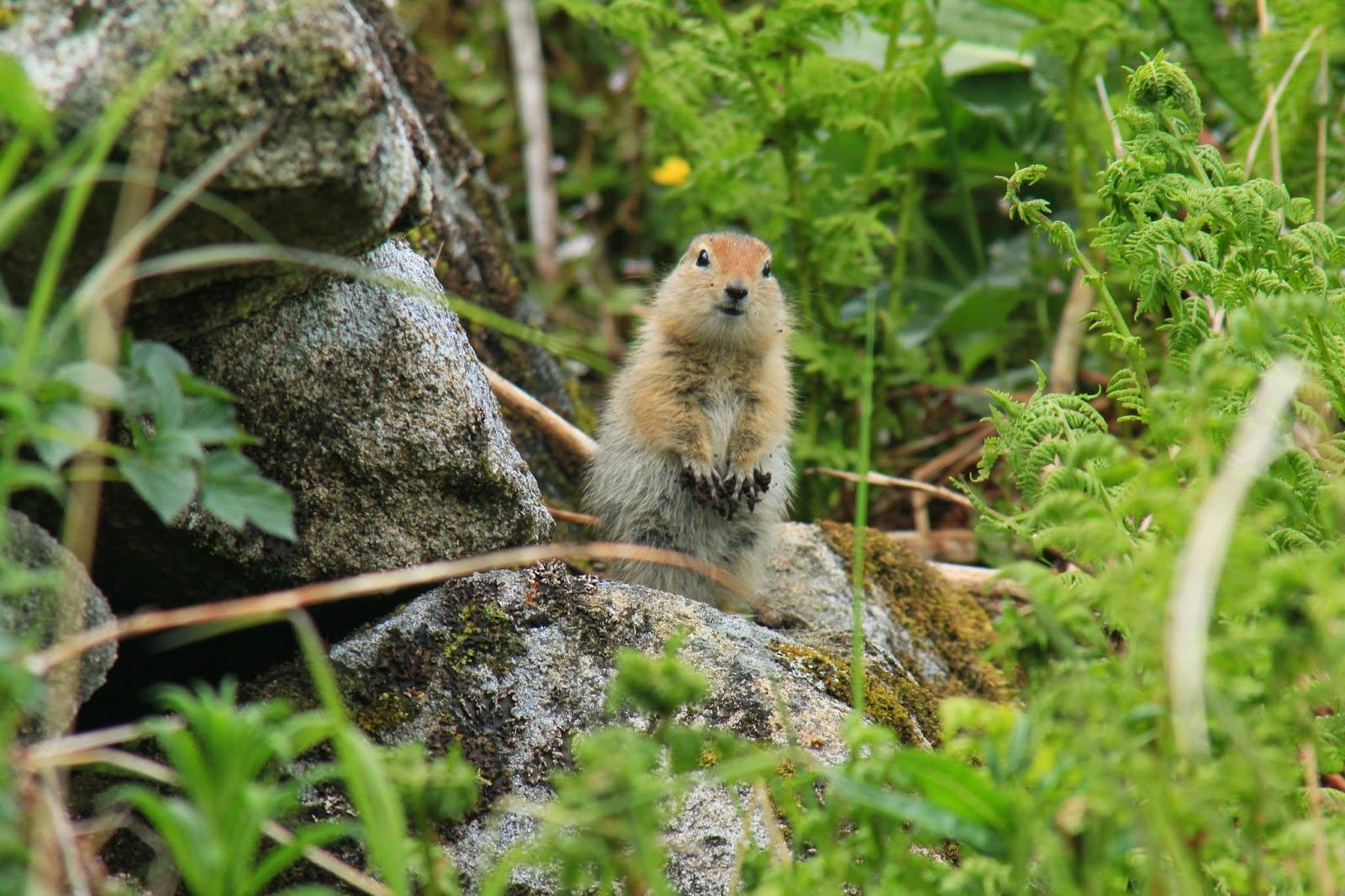
Arctic ground squirrel in Alaska Maritime National Wildlife Refuge

The Arctic ground squirrel is classified as least concern (LC) on the IUCN Red List. NatureServe ranks it as globally secure (G5). The Government of Yukon ranks it as apparently secure to secure (S4S5) in the territory but has not estimated its population size. In British Columbia it is also ranked S4S5 and is on the provincial Yellow List; it has no COSEWIC status, and its general status in Canada was assessed as secure in 2005.

Populations in the boreal forest of the Kluane Lake region, monitored since the 1970s, rose and fell in a nine- to ten-year cycle tied to the snowshoe hare cycle, because the squirrels are alternative prey for the main hare predators. From 1987 to 1996, the species made up 17% of the summer herbivore biomass in the Yukon boreal forest, but by 2000 forest populations had collapsed to nearly zero and they had not recovered by 2013. About 95% of forest populations and many low-elevation meadow populations were locally extinct, while alpine populations remained abundant. Researchers proposed that predation drove the collapse and that forest populations were caught in a "predator pit", with shrub expansion reducing the squirrels' ability to see approaching predators; attempts to reintroduce squirrels to formerly occupied meadow along the Duke River in 2013 failed, as none of the translocated animals survived the winter. A 2021 Government of Yukon survey at Duke Meadows and in the Takhini Valley, where the species was historically abundant, found that 97% and 96% of burrows respectively were inactive, indicating very low occupancy.
