= Bendel Island (Alaska) =

Island in the Shumagin Islands

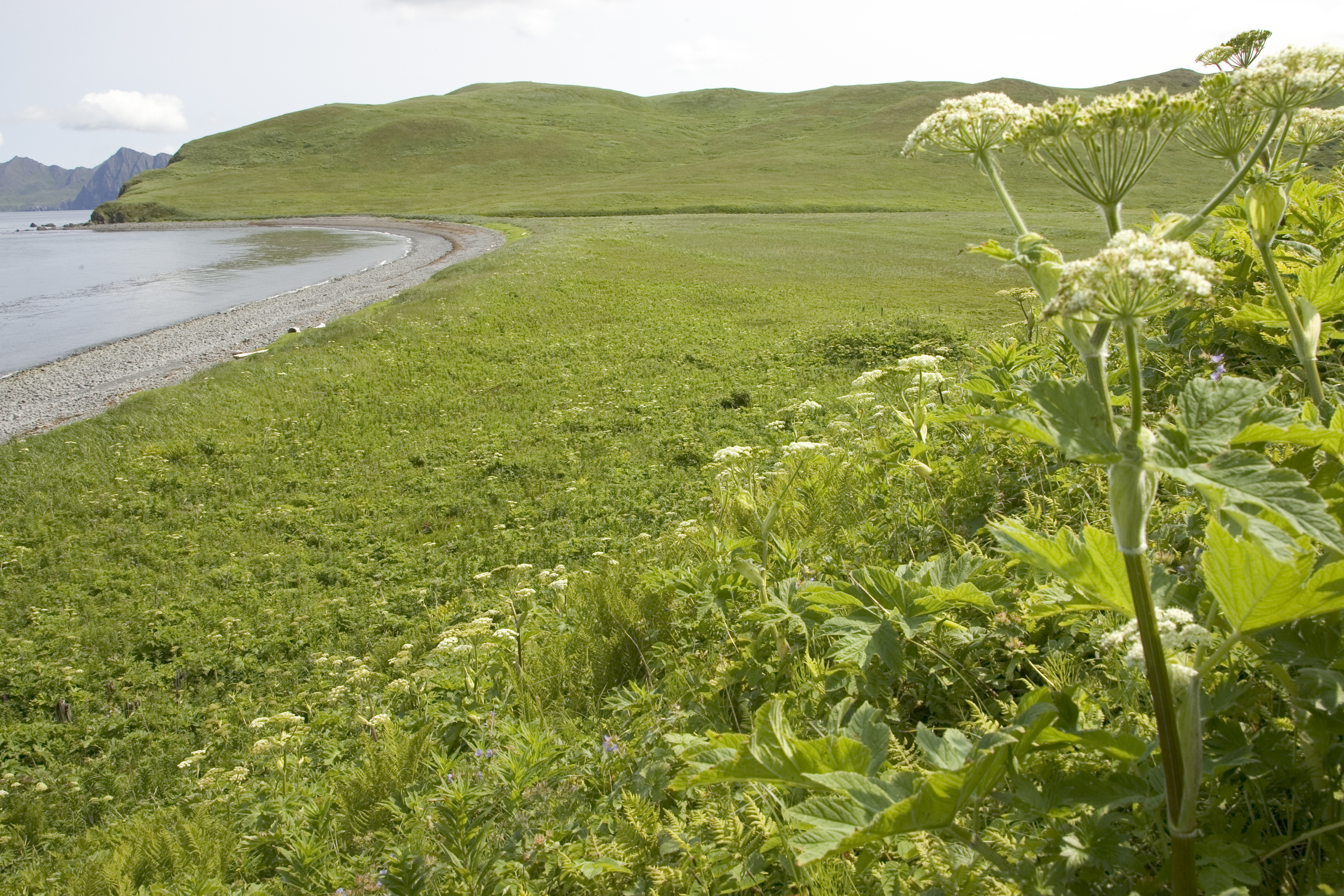
- Bendel Island coastline.
- Interactive map of Bendel Island

Geography
- Location: Gulf of Alaska
- Coordinates: 55°04′30″N 159°47′30″W
- Highest elevation: 194 ft (59.1 m)

Administration
- United States
- State: Alaska
- Borough: Aleutians East Borough

Bendel Island (Also known as: Morse Island) is an island located in the Aleutians East Borough, Gulf of Alaska, Southwest of mainland Alaska, United States. The island is part of an island group named the Shumagin Islands, which consist of 20 islands, and lies between the islands of Big Koniuji and Nagai.

Location in Alaska

== History ==
The island was named by W. H. Dall of the United States Coast Survey for Bernhard Bendel, an Alaskan trader, in either 1871 or 1872. It first appeared on the USCGS charts in 1888. It was also mentioned in a US Bureau of Fisheries report that same year. The island was marked as Morse Island on an USCGS chart in 1891.

== Geography ==
Bendel Island is 3 miles (4.8 km) in length and has an elevation of 194 feet (59 m). It lies at these coordinates: 55°04′30″N 159°47′30″W. The nearest city to Bendel Island is Sand Point, located on Popof Island some 33 miles (53 km) Northwest of Bendel Island. The island is part of the Northeast Aleutian Range.

== Climate ==
Climate data for Cold Bay Airport
Month	Jan	Feb	Mar	Apr	May	Jun	Jul	Aug	Sep	Oct	Nov	Dec	Year
Mean daily maximum °F	32.8	32.3	35.1	38.2	44.9	50.8	55.1	56.2	52.5	45.0	39.1	35.5	43.1
Mean daily minimum °F	23.5	22.9	24.9	28.8	34.8	41.1	46.1	47.4	43.0	35.1	29.9	26.5	33.7
Average precipitation inches	3.08	2.59	2.48	2.30	2.65	2.89	2.53	3.59	4.51	4.54	4.79	4.33	40.28
Mean daily maximum °C	0.4	0.2	1.7	3.4	7.2	10.4	12.8	13.4	11.4	7.2	3.9	1.9	6.2
Mean daily minimum °C	−4.7	−5.1	−3.9	−1.8	1.6	5.1	7.8	8.6	6.1	1.7	−1.2	−3.1	0.9
Average precipitation mm	78	66	63	58	67	73	64	91	115	115	122	110	1,022

== See also ==
- List of islands of Alaska
