= Andronica Island =

Island in Aleutians East Borough, Alaska, United States

Coordinates: 55°19′28″N 160°03′54″W

Andronica Island (Angiidaak in Aleut) is one of the Shumagin Islands in the Gulf of Alaska south of the Alaska Peninsula in Aleutians East Borough of Alaska, United States. It lies east of Popof Island, southeast of Korovin Island, and northwest of Nagai Island. The island has a land area of 14.661 km^{2} (5.6607 sq mi) and is uninhabited.
