= National Register of Historic Places listings in Aleutians East Borough, Alaska =

Location of the Aleutians East Borough in Alaska

This is a list of the National Register of Historic Places listings in Aleutians East Borough, Alaska.

This is intended to be a complete list of the properties and districts on the National Register of Historic Places in Aleutians East Borough, Alaska, United States. The locations of National Register properties and districts for which the latitude and longitude coordinates are included below, may be seen in a Google map.

There are four properties and districts listed on the National Register in the borough.

This National Park Service list is complete through NPS recent listings posted July 10, 2026.

== Current listings ==
| | Name on the Register | Image | Date listed | Location | Community | Description |
|---|---|---|---|---|---|---|
| 1 | Holy Resurrection Church | Holy Resurrection Church | June 6, 1980 (#80000739) | In Belkofski; 55°05′13″N 162°01′56″W | Belkofski | |
| 2 | Port Moller Hot Springs Village Site | | April 20, 1979 (#79000408) | Address restricted | Port Moller | |
| 3 | St. Alexander Nevsky Chapel | St. Alexander Nevsky Chapel | June 6, 1980 (#80000738) | In Akutan; 54°08′00″N 165°46′30″W | Akutan | |
| 4 | St. Nicholas Chapel | St. Nicholas Chapel | June 6, 1980 (#80000742) | In Sand Point; 55°20′12″N 160°29′51″W | Sand Point | |

== See also ==
- List of National Historic Landmarks in Alaska
- National Register of Historic Places listings in Alaska
