= Korovin Island =

Island in Aleutians East Borough, Alaska, United States

Coordinates: 55°25′56″N 160°15′12″W

Korovin Island (Tanĝanuk in Aleut) is one of the Shumagin Islands in the Gulf of Alaska south of the Alaska Peninsula in the Aleutians East Borough of Alaska, United States. The island lies northeast of Popof Island and across the Unga Strait from the mainland peninsula. To its southeast are Andronica Island, and further southeast, Nagai Island. Korovin island has a land area of 67.85 km^{2} (26.197 sq mi) and is uninhabited by humans.

Korovin Island was named by the Russians, presumably after Ivan Korovin, an early Russian explorer who explored the Aleutian Islands in 1762. The word is from the Russian Koróva ("cow").

The island has two summits. The western end is 1,816 feet (554 m) high, and the eastern end is a rocky cliff 1,200 feet (370 m) high. The middle portion consists of low land and marshes. The north end of the island is known as Scotland Point. Two miles southwestward of Scotland Point is Grosvold Bay, which may be used as an anchorage.
