= KQA =

KQA may refer to:

- Akutan Seaplane Base, Alaska, United States, FAA location identifier KQA
- Kenya Airways, ICAO airline code KQA
