= Agdaagux Tribe of King Cove =

US federally recognized Tribe

Agdaagux Tribe of King Cove is a federally recognized tribe based in Belkofski, Alaska. As of 2022, the tribe has a population of 845 people, 170 households, and 116 families. The tribe is descended from Unangax people.

== King Cove, Alaska ==
King Cove, Alaska is located on the south side of the Alaskan Peninsula in between Deer Passage and Deer Island along the Aleutians East Borough. The city was said to have been first founded in 1911 when the first salmon canneries opened, and was officially incorporated as a city in 1947. The land itself is only accessible by plane and boat with one local airport.

== Native language and its origins ==
Unangam Tunuu, the indigenous term for the Aleut language, is also known as the heritage language of the Unangux people who live in the Aleutian Islands, and is part of the Eskimo-Aleut Language Family.

Aleut is in its own branch separate from the Eskimo-Aleut family. All of the Native Alaskan dialects have been found to be influenced by Russian language. Especially as a result of the Russian fur traders as well as the Russian Orthodox. This is seen through the first Aleutian alphabet recorded from the Bering Aleut dialect and its comparison to Russian.

== Culture ==
Prior to Russian and Scandinavian settlements, the Unangax̂ people lived off of the land hunting and fishing with kayaks called bidarkas. Relying heavily on trading and sharing between families for survival, especially to prevent food from spoiling. Pre-contact with the Russian fur traders, the natural world and spiritual were seen as one, including people, animals, places, oceans, and more. Though many of those beliefs were altered or lost soon after the Russians stated settling in the Aleutian Islands in the late 1700s.

== Economy ==
=== Business ===
31 business license are currently located in King Cove. Peter Pans Seafood an LLC, has one of the largest facilities in King Cove. They fish king crab, cod, salmon, pollock, and many other types of crab and fish.

=== Education ===
There is one main school in King Cove which is run by the Aleutians East Borough School District.

== Aleutian internment camps ==
Aleutian internment camps during World War II, also known as evacuations of the Aleutian people. To many Aleutians this event was seen as very humiliating due to having been stripped from their homes and put into camps where 1 in every 10 natives died in these camps due to terrible living conditions.

In 1988 there were reparations of $12,000 given to the remaining internment camp survivors through the Aleutian and Pribilof Islands Restituition Act.

More information can be found in a documentary called “Aleut Story” made in 2005 that tells about the Aleutian experience through internment camps/evacuation during World War II.
