= Port Moller Hot Springs Village Site =

Archaeological site in Alaska, United States

- U.S. National Register of Historic Places
- Alaska Heritage Resources Survey
- Location: Address restricted
- Nearest city: Port Moller, Alaska
- Area: 49.7 acres (20.1 ha)
- NRHP reference No.: 79000408
- AHRS No.: XPM-001
- Added to NRHP: April 20, 1979

The Port Moller Hot Springs Village Site is a prehistoric archaeological site on the Alaska Peninsula. It is located on the shores of Moller Bay, an indentation on the peninsula with extensive tidal flats. Until historical times the area was a border region between the Aleut and the Inuit. The site is notable for the presence of a sulphurous hot spring, which provides drinkable water. The 50-acre (20 ha) site contains the remains of a native village and extensive refuse middens. The site was first excavated in 1928.

The site was listed on the National Register of Historic Places in 1979.

== See also ==
- National Register of Historic Places listings in Aleutians East Borough, Alaska
