= Operl Island (Alaska) =

Coordinates: 55.394140°N 162.796755°W

Operl Island is a barrier island of Izembek Lagoon in the Bering Sea, and is part of Izembek National Wildlife Refuge, a protected area home to a variety of wildlife, including Pacific black brant, emperor geese, and seabirds.

Operl Island is an important stopover for migratory birds. In the fall, thousands of Pacific black brant and emperor geese use the island to rest and refuel before continuing their journey south.
