= Akun Island =

Alaskan island in the Bering Sea

Coordinates: 54°11′18″N 165°31′43″W

Location in Alaska

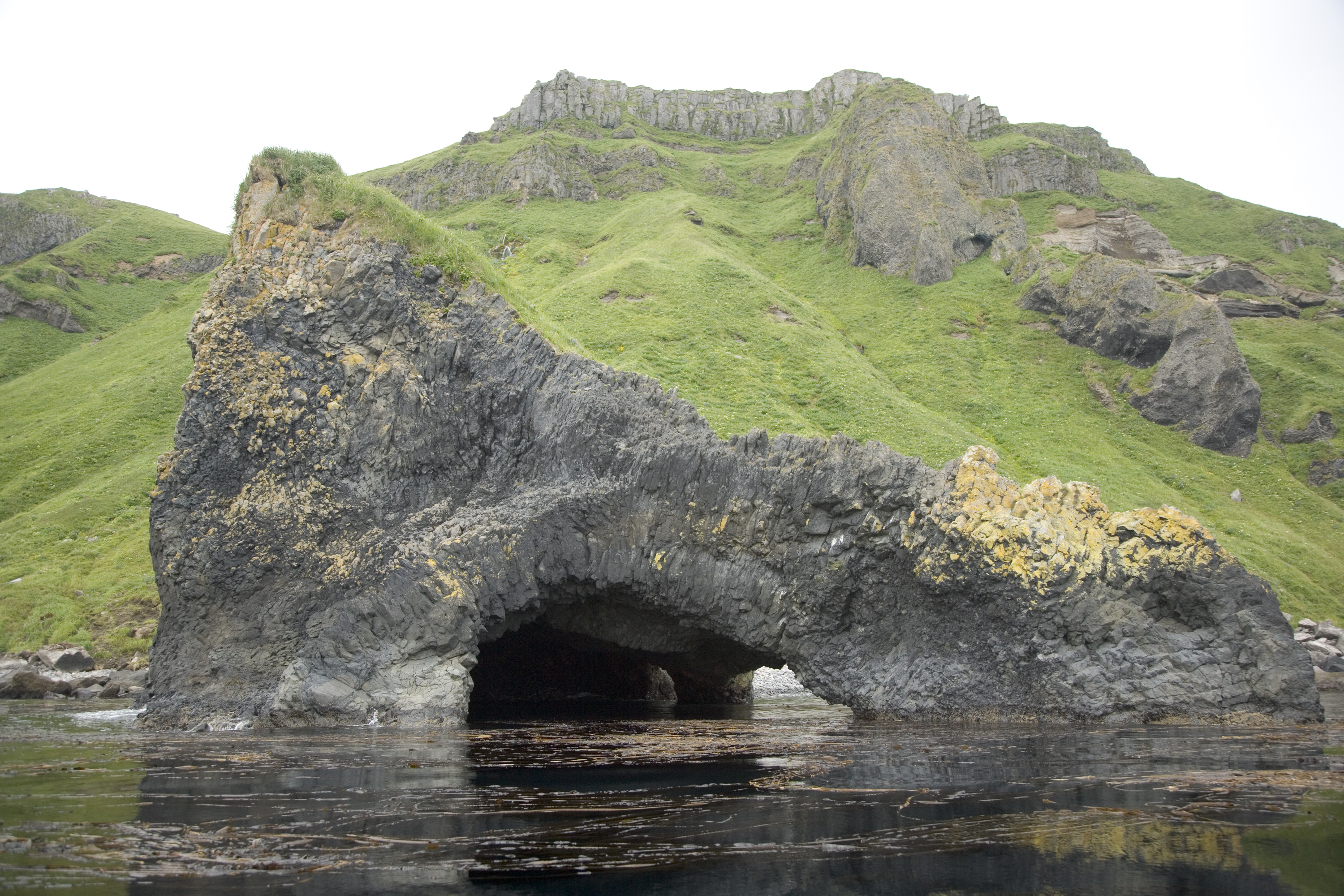
Akun Island basalt sea cave

Akun Island (Aleut: Akungan) is one of the Fox Islands subgroup of the Aleutian Islands in the Aleutians East Borough of southwestern Alaska.

== Geography ==
The island lies east of Akutan Island and southwest of Unimak Island, across the Unimak Pass strait. The Krenitzin Islands lie to the south and southeast, across the Avatanak Strait.

Akun Island has a land area of 64.39 sq mi (166.77 km²). It is 22.57 kilometres (14.02 mi) long, 18.2 kilometres (11.3 mi) wide.

== Population ==
It is unpopulated, except for airport workers and a few people controlling the cattle.

Akun Island is home to a small but significant population of cows. They are no longer domesticated but the population is controlled. Three domesticated horses also inhabit the island.

== Airport ==
With the cessation of amphibious airplane service to Akutan on Akutan Island, the Akutan Seaplane Base closed in 2012. It was replaced by a new $75.5m land-based airstrip six miles (9.7 km) across the water on Akun Island, named Akutan Airport. It was built by Kiewit, R&M Consultants, and DOT.

The airport was connected to Akutan by an expensive hovercraft shuttle, which couldn't operate safely when winds were too strong or waves too high. Operating costs were very high. A helicopter provides the link between Akun and Akutan. The airport has a small hotel, which is used when a flight arrives and the hovercraft is unable to run.
