= Akutan Airport =

- IATA: KQA; ICAO: PAUT; FAA LID: 7AK

Summary
- Airport type: Public
- Owner: Alaska Department of Transportation & Public Facilities
- Serves: Akutan, Alaska
- Location: Akun Island
- Elevation AMSL: 133 ft (41 m)
- Coordinates: 54°08′41″N 165°36′15″W

Map
- Location of airport in Alaska

Runways
Direction	Length		Surface
Direction	ft	m	Surface
9/27	4,500	1,372	Asphalt

Statistics (2015)
- Operations: 624
- Based aircraft: 0
- Passengers: 2,729
- Freight: 118,000 lbs
- Source: Federal Aviation Administration

Akutan Airport (IATA: KQA, ICAO: PAUT, FAA LID: 7AK) is a state-owned public-use airport serving Akutan, a city on Akutan Island in the Aleutians East Borough of the U.S. state of Alaska. The airport is located on Akun Island, 6 miles (10 km) east of Akutan Island. Scheduled air service is subsidized by the Essential Air Service program.

The airport was opened in 2012. Akutan was previously served by amphibious airplane service to Akutan Seaplane Base, located on Akutan Island. However, in 2012 operator PenAir announced that they would retire their Grumman Goose aircraft and as a result the traditional airport on Akun Island was built to serve Akutan. The airport on Akun was originally connected to Akutan by a hovercraft, but the connection is now provided via helicopter operated by Maritime Helicopters.

== Facilities ==
Akutan Airport covers an area of 369 acres (149 ha) at an elevation of 133 feet (41 m) above mean sea level. It has one runway designated 9/27 with an asphalt surface measuring 4,500 by 75 feet (1,372 x 23 m).

== Airlines and destinations ==
The following airline offers scheduled passenger service at this airport:

Airlines	Destinations
Grant Aviation	Unalaska/Dutch Harbor
Maritime Helicopters	Akutan Seaplane Base

=== Statistics ===
Carrier shares: August 2025 – July 2026
Carrier	Passengers (arriving and departing)
Grant Aviation	1,650(50.23%)
Maritime Helicopters	1,640(49.77%)

Top domestic destinations: August 2025 – July 2026
Rank	City	Airport name & IATA code	Passengers
1	Akutan, Alaska	Akutan Seaplane Base	850
2	Unalaska, AK	Unalaska Airport (DUT)	790

== See also ==
- Akutan Seaplane Base (IATA: was KQA, FAA LID: KQA) located at 54°08′02″N 165°46′42″W
- List of airports in Alaska

== Other sources ==
- Essential Air Service documents (Docket DOT-OST-2000-7068) from the U.S. Department of Transportation:
  - Order 2012-11-15 (November 16, 2012): selecting Grant Aviation, Inc., to provide Essential Air Service at Akutan, Alaska, for two years, beginning as soon as the carrier inaugurates scheduled service (November 28, 2012) at annual subsidy rates of $724,025 for the first six months of service and $579,220 for the remainder of the contract (through September 30, 2014). Akutan receives 12 nonstop round trips per week to Dutch Harbor with 9-seat Piper PA-31 Navajo aircraft.
  - Order 2014-6-3 (June 6, 2014): requesting proposals from air carriers interested in providing Essential Air Service (EAS) at Akutan, Alaska, for a new contract period beginning October 1, 2014.
