= Simeonof Wilderness =

Wilderness area in Alaska

Coordinates: 54°54′N 159°16′W

The Simeonof Wilderness is a wilderness area in Aleutians East Borough, Alaska. The area was designated in 1976 by the United States Congress and is currently managed by the Alaska Maritime National Wildlife Refuge. The Simeonof Wilderness is located on homonymous Simeonof Island in the Shumagin Island group.

== History ==
Simeonof Island was given its first English name in 1872, by W. H. Dall of the United States Coast Survey. Earlier names include the Russian Semenovsky or Semenovskie and the Aleut Tachkinach, Taghinak, Tikhiniak, or Takh-kiniakh. Gold deposits on the island were discovered by G. C. Martin in 1905.

Between 1890 and 1930, cattle and fox ranchers used Simeonof Island, but they eventually abandoned their ranches. Cattle was returned to the island in 1960, but the herd was too large for the island and was subsequently removed in 1985.

As the Shumagin Islands are historically breeding grounds for sea otters, a wildlife refuge was established on Simeonof Island in 1958 to protect their dwindling populations. In 1976 the island was designated as a wilderness area, and part of the Alaska Peninsula subunit of the Alaska Maritime National Wildlife Refuge.
