= Alexander Nevsky Chapel, Akutan =

Historic church in Alaska, United States

- St. Alexander Nevsky Chapel
- U.S. National Register of Historic Places
- Alaska Heritage Resources Survey
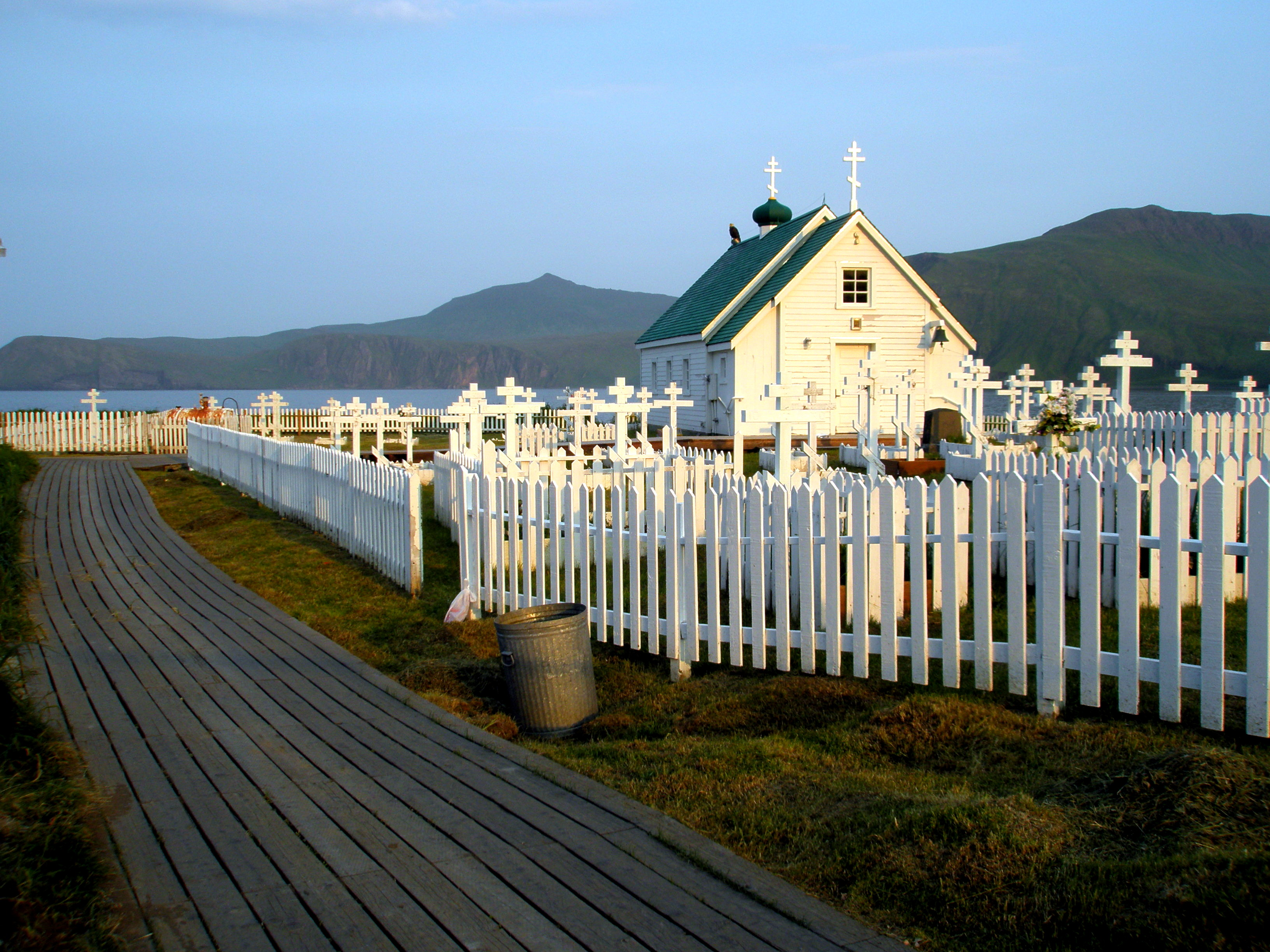

- Location within Alaska
- Location: In Akutan, Akutan, Alaska
- Coordinates: 54°8′0″N 165°46′30″W
- Area: less than one acre
- Built: 1918
- MPS: Russian Orthodox Church Buildings and Sites TR
- NRHP reference No.: 80000738
- AHRS No.: UNI-028

Significant dates
- Added to NRHP: June 6, 1980
- Designated AHRS: May 18, 1973

St. Alexander Nevsky Chapel (Russian: Часовня Святого Александра Невского) is a historic Russian Orthodox church chapel in Akutan, Alaska, United States.

It was built in 1918 as a replacement for an 1878 building, reusing much of the same lumber. The chapel served the Russian Orthodox community in the trading port of Akutan and is now part of the Diocese of Alaska of the Orthodox Church in America.

In 1980, it was added to the National Register of Historic Places.

== See also ==
- National Register of Historic Places listings in Aleutians East Borough, Alaska
