= Native Village of Akutan =

Federally recognized Alaska Native tribe

- People: Aleuts
- Headquarters: Akutan, Alaska, US

Government
- Chief: Joe Bereskin

Tribal Council
- Akutan Tribal Council

The Native Village of Akutan is a federally recognized Aleut Alaska Native tribal entity.

== About ==
The Native Village of Akutan is headquartered at the city of Akutan on Akutan Island of the Aleutians East Borough. As of 2005, the tribe had 163 enrolled citizens.

== See also ==
- List of Alaska Native tribal entities
