= St. Nicholas Chapel (Sand Point, Alaska) =

Historic church in Alaska, United States

- U.S. National Register of Historic Places
- Alaska Heritage Resources Survey
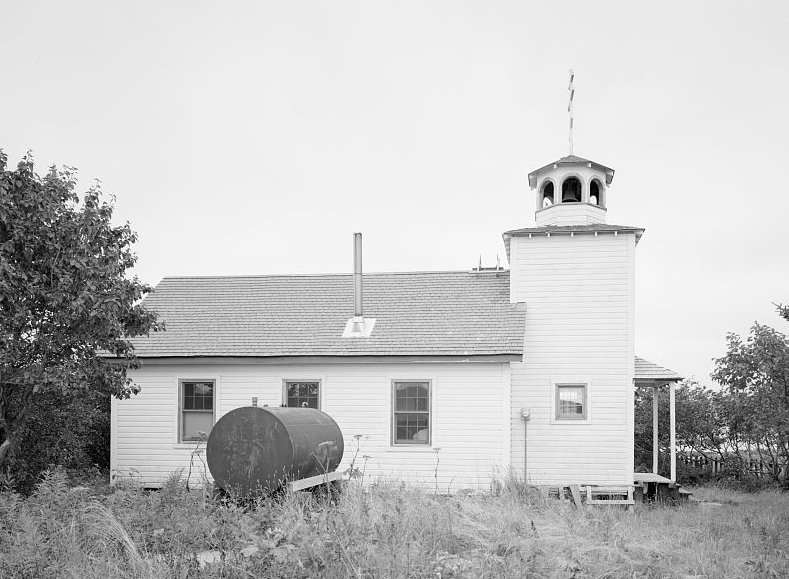

- Location within Alaska
- Location: In Sand Point, Sand Point, Alaska
- Coordinates: 55°20′12″N 160°29′51″W
- Area: less than one acre
- Built: 1936
- MPS: Russian Orthodox Church Buildings and Sites TR
- NRHP reference No.: 80000742
- AHRS No.: XPM-007

Significant dates
- Added to NRHP: June 6, 1980
- Designated AHRS: May 18, 1973

St. Nicholas Chapel is a historic Russian Orthodox chapel in Sand Point, Alaska. Now it is under Diocese of Alaska of the Orthodox Church in America.

It was built in 1936. According to a 1979 evaluation of the church for possible historic registry listing, it is "a building of strong religious statement, clear and expressive". The evaluation notes that its entrance vestibule is within a "commanding" square tower at its west end, which "rises to a truncated pyramidal roof above its second level, and supports a handsome open-work octagonal bell tower".

As of 1979, it was in deteriorated condition and services were no longer conducted in the building (they were conducted in a private house, instead). But the building was "swept and kept neat" and secure from vandalism.

It was added to the National Register of Historic Places in 1980.

== See also ==
- National Register of Historic Places listings in Aleutians East Borough, Alaska
