= Akutan, Alaska =

City in Alaska, United States

Akutan Achan-ingiiga
- City
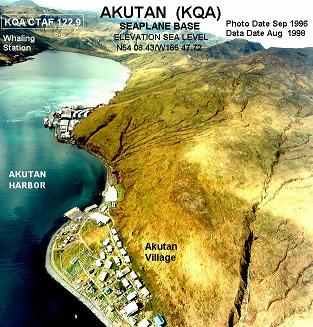

- Location in Alaska Akutan (North America)
- Coordinates: 54°7′57″N 165°46′30″W
- Country: United States
- State: Alaska
- Borough: Aleutians East
- Incorporated: 1979

Government
  - Mayor: Joe Bereskin
  - State senator: Lyman Hoffman (D)
  - State rep.: Bryce Edgmon (I)

Area
  - Total: 147.90 sq mi (383.07 km^{2})
  - Land: 65.98 sq mi (170.88 km^{2})
  - Water: 81.93 sq mi (212.19 km^{2})
- Elevation: 98 ft (30 m)

Population (2020)
  - Total: 1,589
  - Density: 24/sq mi (9.3/km^{2})
- Time zone: UTC-9 (Alaska (AKST))
  - Summer (DST): UTC-8 (AKDT)
- ZIP code: 99553
- Area code: 907
- FIPS code: 02-01090
- GNIS feature ID: 1418123
- Website: akutanak.us

Akutan (/ˈækuːtæn/ AK-oo-tan, Aleut: Achan-ingiiga) is a city on Akutan Island in Aleutians East Borough, Alaska, United States. The population was 1,589 at the 2020 census, up from 1,027 in 2010, making it the 4th fastest-growing city of the decade in Alaska. Akutan Harbor is adjacent.

== Geography ==
Akutan is located at 54°7′57″N 165°46′30″W. Akutan is located in the Aleutian Islands Recording District.

Akutan is located on Akutan Island in the eastern Aleutians, one of the Krenitzin Islands in the Fox Islands group. It is 35 miles (56 km) east of Unalaska, and 766 miles (1,233 km) southwest of Anchorage. Akutan lies in the maritime climate zone, resulting in mild winters and cool summers. Mean temperatures range from 22 to 55 °F (−6 to 13 °C), and precipitation averages 28 inches (710 mm) per year. High winds and storms are frequent in the winter, and fog is common in the summer.

According to the U.S. Census Bureau, the city has a total area of 18.9 square miles (49 km^{2}), of which, 14.0 square miles (36 km^{2}) of it is land and 4.9 square miles (13 km^{2}) of it (25.69%) is water.

== History and culture ==
Akutan began in 1878 as a fur storage and trading port for the Western Fur & Trading Company. The company's agent established a commercial cod fishing and processing business that quickly attracted nearby Unangan to the community. A Russian Orthodox church and a school were built in 1878, but was replaced by the St. Alexander Nevsky Chapel, built in 1918.

The Pacific Whaling Company built a whale processing station across the bay from Akutan in 1912. It was the only whaling station in the Aleutians, and operated until 1939.

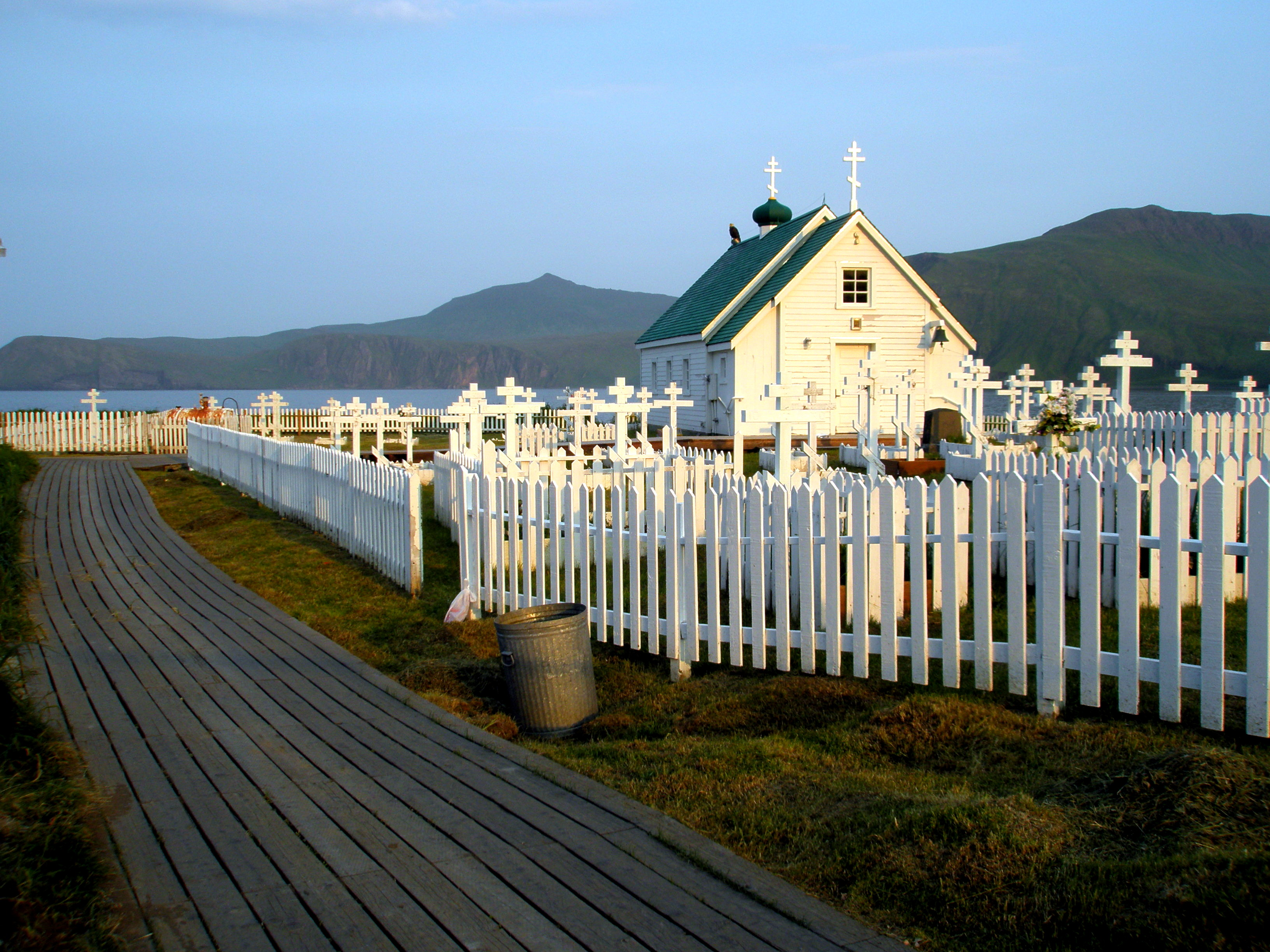
St. Alexander Nevsky Chapel

After the Japanese attacked Unalaska in June 1942, the U.S. government evacuated Akutan residents to the Ketchikan area. In June 1942, a Japanese A6M Zero fighter piloted by Tadayoshi Koga crashed on Akutan Island. It was recovered in July by the United States Army Air Force. This plane, dubbed the Akutan Zero, significantly aided American tacticians in devising dog fighting techniques to defeat the Zero, and helped change the course of the war.

The village was re-established in 1944, although many villagers chose not to return. This exposure to the outside world brought many changes to the traditional lifestyle and attitudes of the community. The city was incorporated in 1979.

A federally recognized tribe is located in the community—the Native Village of Akutan. The population of the community consists of 16.4% Alaska Native or part Native. Akutan is a fishing community, and is the site of a traditional Unangan village. Approximately 75 persons are year-round residents; the majority of the population are transient fish processing workers that live in group quarters.

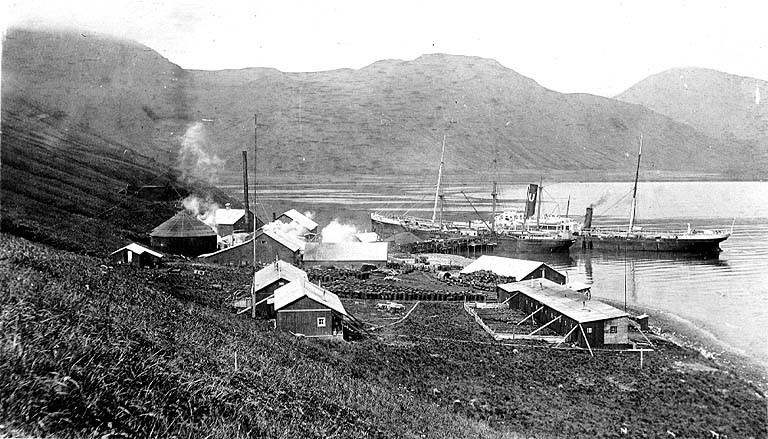
Whaling station along the harbor at Akutan ca. 1915

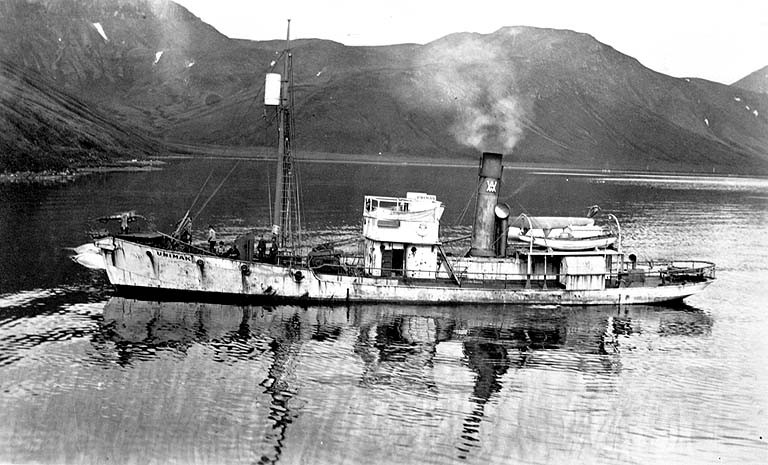
Whaler Unimak in Akutan Harbor, 1914. An American Pacific Sea Products Co. vessel

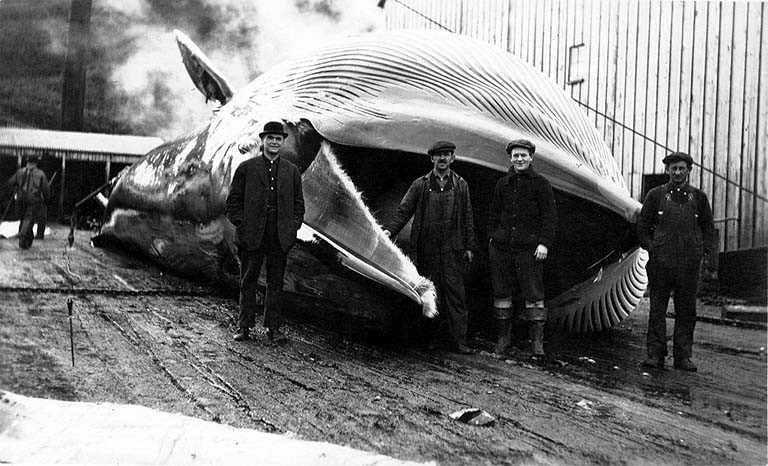
Men standing by dead whale at Akutan Harbor whaling station, 1914

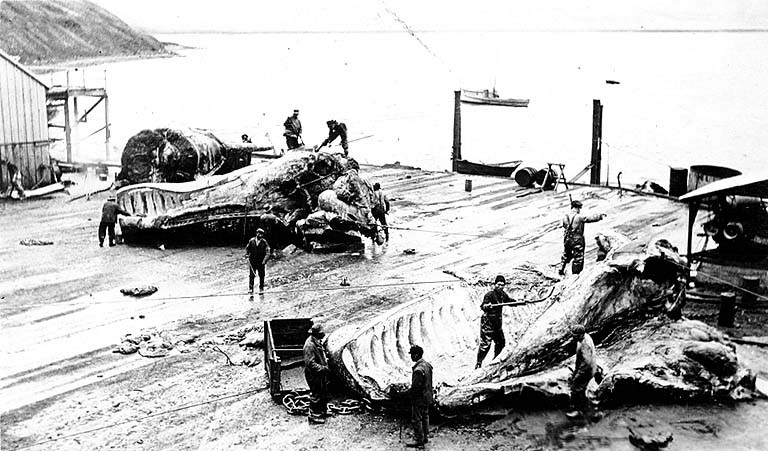
Flensing whales at Akutan, ca. 1915

== Demographics ==
Historical population
Census	Pop.	Note	%±
1880	65		—
1890	80		23.1%
1920	66		—
1930	71		7.6%
1940	80		12.7%
1950	86		7.5%
1960	107		24.4%
1970	101		−5.6%
1980	169		67.3%
1990	589		248.5%
2000	713		21.1%
2010	1,027		44.0%
2020	1,589		54.7%
U.S. Decennial Census

Akutan first appeared on the 1880 U.S. Census as an unincorporated Aleut village. It reported 65 residents, of whom 63 were Aleut and 2 were White. In 1890, it reported 80 residents, of whom 71 were Native, 6 were Creole (Mixed Russian & Native) and 3 were White. It did not appear again until the 1920 census. It formally incorporated in 1979. Beginning in 1990, it reported an Asian plurality of residents. It is one of only three communities in Alaska as of 2010 to have either an Asian plurality (Kodiak) or majority (Adak).

=== 2020 census ===
As of the 2020 census, Akutan had a population of 1,589. The median age was 42.9 years. 1.4% of residents were under the age of 18 and 5.5% of residents were 65 years of age or older. For every 100 females there were 309.5 males, and for every 100 females age 18 and over there were 313.5 males age 18 and over.

0.0% of residents lived in urban areas, while 100.0% lived in rural areas.

There were 48 households in Akutan, of which 39.6% had children under the age of 18 living in them. Of all households, 33.3% were married-couple households, 39.6% were households with a male householder and no spouse or partner present, and 20.8% were households with a female householder and no spouse or partner present. About 27.1% of all households were made up of individuals and 12.5% had someone living alone who was 65 years of age or older.

There were 52 housing units, of which 7.7% were vacant. The homeowner vacancy rate was 0.0% and the rental vacancy rate was 0.0%.

Racial composition as of the 2020 census
Race	Number	Percent
White	152	9.6%
Black or African American	266	16.7%
American Indian and Alaska Native	57	3.6%
Asian	499	31.4%
Native Hawaiian and Other Pacific Islander	11	0.7%
Some other race	556	35.0%
Two or more races	48	3.0%
Hispanic or Latino (of any race)	563	35.4%

=== 2000 census ===
As of the census of 2000, there were 713 people, 34 households, and 17 families residing in the city. The population density was 50.8 inhabitants per square mile (19.6/km^{2}). There were 38 housing units at an average density of 2.7 units per square mile (1.0 units/km^{2}). The racial makeup of the city was 23.56% White, 2.10% Black or African American, 15.71% Native American, 38.57% Asian, 0.28% Pacific Islander, 18.23% from other races, and 1.54% from two or more races. 20.76% of the population were Hispanic or Latino of any race.

There were 34 households, out of which 20.6% had children under the age of 18 living with them, 32.4% were married couples living together, 14.7% had a female householder with no husband present, and 47.1% were non-families. 38.2% of all households were made up of individuals, and 2.9% had someone living alone who was 65 years of age or older. The average household size was 2.21 and the average family size was 3.00.

In the city, the age distribution of the population shows 3.1% under the age of 18, 11.1% from 18 to 24, 48.2% from 25 to 44, 36.2% from 45 to 64, and 1.4% who were 65 years of age or older. The median age was 40 years. For every 100 females, there were 334.8 males. For every 100 females age 18 and over, there were 342.9 males.

The median income for a household in the city was $33,750, and the median income for a family was $43,125. Males had a median income of $13,988 versus $23,750 for females. The per capita income for the city was $12,258. None of the families and 45.5% of the population were living below the poverty line, including no under eighteens and 40.0% of those over 64.

During the 2000 U.S. Census, total housing units numbered 38, and vacant housing units numbered 4. It showed 97 residents as employed. The unemployment rate at that time was 83.89 percent, although 84.84 percent of all adults were not in the work force.

== Public services ==
Water is supplied by a local stream and dam, originally constructed in 1927. Water is treated and piped into all homes. Funds have been requested to develop two new water catchment dams, and construct a new 125,000-gal. water storage tank and treatment plant. Sewage is piped to a community septic tank, with effluent discharge through an ocean outfall. Refuse is collected three times a week; a new landfill site and incinerator were recently completed. The City recycles aluminum. Trident Seafoods operates its own water, sewer and electric facilities. Electricity is provided by Akutan Electric Utility.

There is one school located in the community, Akutan School of the Aleutians East Borough School District (AEBSD), attended by 18 students. Circa October 1978 the school, then a part of the Aleutian Region School District, had a single teacher, and 12 students.

Local hospitals or health clinics include Anesia Kudrin Memorial Clinic. Anesia Kudrin Memorial Clinic is a Primary Health Care facility. Eastern Aleutian Tribes Inc. operates the Anesia Kudrin clinic as part of its health care system. The clinic is a qualified Emergency Care Center. Akutan is classified as an isolated town/Sub-Regional Center, it is found in EMS Region 2H in the Aleutian/Pribilof Region. Emergency Services have coastal and helicopter access. Emergency service is provided by volunteers and a health aide. There is a physician assistant certified at the Anesia Kudrin clinic, and for much of the year there a physician assistant or nurse practitioner at the processing plant's occupational medicine/urgent care clinic. Auxiliary health care is provided by Akutan First Responders; or by flight to Unalaska or Anchorage.

Transportation is provided by seaplane, by private or fleet fishing vessels, and the State Ferry makes monthly visits in summer weather.

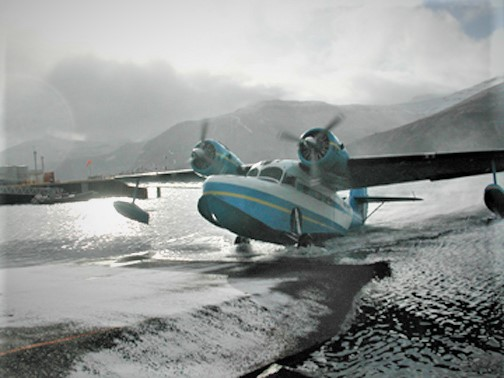
A Grumman Goose operated by Pen Air at Akutan

== Economy ==
Commercial fish processing dominates Akutan's cash-based economy, and not many locals are seasonally employed. Trident Seafoods operates a large processing plant west of the city for cod, crab, pollock and fish meal. The population of Akutan can quadruple or quintuple during processing months. Seven residents hold commercial fishing permits, primarily for halibut and other groundfish. Subsistence foods include seal, salmon, herring, halibut, clams, wild cattle, and game birds.

=== Taxes ===
Sales: None, Property: None, Special: 1% Raw Fish Tax (City); 2% Raw Fish Tax (Borough)

== Transportation ==
Boats and amphibious aircraft, hovercraft, or helicopter are the only means of transportation into and out of Akutan. A 200-foot (61 m) dock and a small boat mooring basin are available. Plans are underway to develop a practical way to get to a large boat harbor that has been built at the head of the bay. The State Ferry operates from Kodiak bi-monthly between May and October. Cargo is delivered weekly by freighter from Seattle; the City owns and operates a landing craft, the M/V Akutan. Akutan has no airstrip due to the steep terrain, however, a seaplane base is available and open to the public. Helicopter service between Akutan and Akun Island, the location of Akutan Airport, began in February 2014. The only airline company serving the airport is Grant Aviation, flying to nearby Dutch Harbor. The airport was expected to cost $77 million of which nearly $60 million came from the U.S. federal government. Trident paid $1 million towards the cost of the airport.
