= Akutan Seaplane Base =

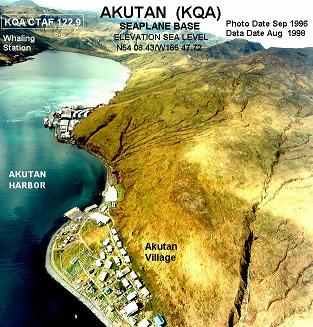
- IATA: none; ICAO: none; FAA LID: KQA

Summary
- Airport type: Public
- Owner: City of Akutan
- Serves: Akutan, Alaska
- Location: Akutan Island
- Elevation AMSL: 0 ft (0 m)
- Coordinates: 54°08′02″N 165°46′42″W

Map
- Location of airport in Alaska

Runways
Direction	Length		Surface
Direction	ft	m	Surface
E/W	10,000	3,048	Water

Statistics (2015)
- Aircraft operations: 102
- Based aircraft: 0
- Source: Federal Aviation Administration

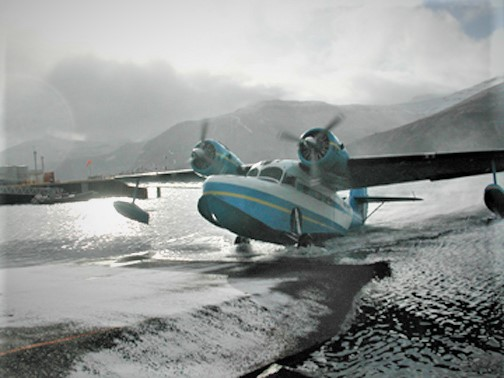
PenAir Grumman Goose at Akutan

Akutan Seaplane Base (IATA: was KQA, FAA LID: KQA) is a public use seaplane base located in Akutan, a city on Akutan Island in the Aleutians East Borough of the U.S. state of Alaska. Scheduled seaplane service was subsidized by the Essential Air Service program until late 2012 when PenAir retired their Grumman Goose amphibious aircraft and a new land-based airport on neighboring Akun Island was built. The new airport is known as Akutan Airport.

As per Federal Aviation Administration records, the airport had 1,346 passenger boardings (enplanements) in calendar year 2008, 1,200 enplanements in 2009, and 1,246 in 2010. It is included in the National Plan of Integrated Airport Systems for 2011–2015, which categorized it as a general aviation airport (the commercial service category requires at least 2,500 enplanements per year).

== Airlines and destinations ==
Airlines	Destinations
Maritime Helicopters	Akutan-Akun

Carrier shares: January – December 2015
Carrier	Passengers (arriving and departing)
PenAir	25(100%)

Top domestic destinations: Jan. – Dec. 2015
Rank	Destination	Airport	Passengers
1	Unalaska, AK	Unalaska Airport (DUT)	25

== See also ==
- Akutan Airport (FAA: 7AK) located at 54°08′41″N 165°36′15″W
- List of airports in Alaska

== Other sources ==
- Essential Air Service documents (Docket DOT-OST-2000-7068) from the U.S. Department of Transportation:
  - Order 2005-5-12 (May 19, 2005): re-selecting Peninsula Airways (PenAir) to provide essential air service at Akutan, Alaska, at an annual subsidy rate of $350,381, for the two-year period May 1, 2005, through April 30, 2007.
  - Order 2007-3-3 (March 9, 2007): re-selecting Peninsula Airways (PenAir) to provide subsidized essential air service at Akutan, Alaska, for the period from May 1, 2007, through April 30, 2009, at an annual subsidy rate of $556,155.
  - Order 2009-5-4 (May 5, 2009): selecting Peninsula Airways (PenAir) to provide essential air service at Akutan for an annual subsidy rate of $654,964, through April 30, 2011.
  - Order 2011-3-31 (March 25, 2011): re-selecting Peninsula Airways, Inc., (PenAir) to provide essential air service (EAS) at Akutan, Alaska, at annual subsidy rate of $710,157, from May 1, 2011, through April 30, 2013.
  - Notice of Termination of Service (August 6, 2012): Peninsula Airways, Inc. ("PenAir") hereby gives notice of its intent to discontinue all of its service to Akutan, Alaska, as soon as replacement service begins. PenAir respectfully requests that the department promptly issue a request for proposals to enable PenAir to terminate service on September 1, 2012, or as soon thereafter as possible.
