= Izembek National Wildlife Refuge =

Wildlife refuge in Alaska, United States

- IUCN category IV (habitat/species management area)
- Location within Alaska
- Location: Aleutians East Borough, Alaska, United States
- Nearest city: Cold Bay, Alaska
- Coordinates: 55°15′N 162°45′W
- Area: 315,000 acres (1,270 km^{2})
- Established: 1960
- Governing body: U.S. Fish and Wildlife Service
- Website: izembek.fws.gov

Ramsar Wetland
- Official name: Izembek Lagoon National Wildlife Refuge
- Designated: 18 December 1986
- Reference no.: 349

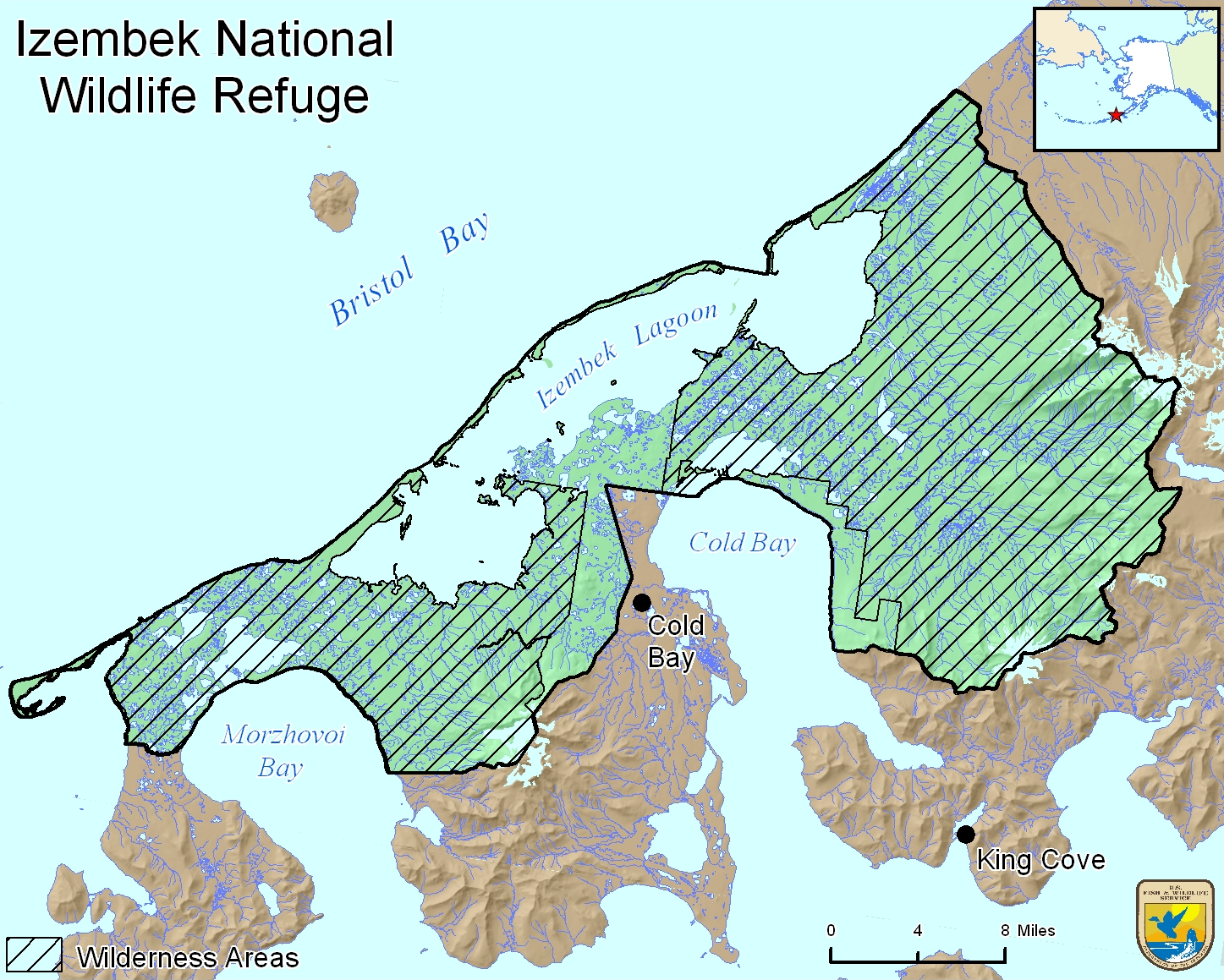

The Izembek National Wildlife Refuge is the smallest of the National Wildlife Refuges located in the U.S. state of Alaska. It lies on the northwest (Bering Sea) coastal side of central Aleutians East Borough. Almost all of the refuge (307,982 acres (124,636 ha) out of 315,000 acres (1,270 km^{2})) was designated as wilderness in 1980 under the Alaska National Interest Lands Conservation Act (ANILCA). The refuge is administered from offices in Cold Bay.

Izembek National Wildlife Refuge lies between the highly productive waters of the Bering Sea and the Gulf of Alaska. Within the heart of the refuge is Izembek Lagoon, a 30-mile (48 km) long and 5-mile (8.0 km) wide coastal ecosystem that contains one of the world's largest eelgrass (Zostera marina) beds. More than 200 species of wildlife and nine species of fish can be found on the refuge. Millions of migratory waterfowl and shorebirds find food and shelter in the coastal lagoons and freshwater wetlands on their way to and from their subarctic and arctic breeding grounds. This extraordinary abundance and diversity of waterfowl has attracted international attention.

== History ==
In 1986, Izembek National Wildlife Refuge and Izembek State Game Refuge, which encompasses the submerged land of Izembek Lagoon, was the first wetland area in the United States to be recognized as a Wetland of International Importance by the Ramsar Convention. In 2001, Izembek Refuge was also designated as a Globally Important Bird Area by the National Audubon Society.

Attempts have been made to build a road through the refuge connecting the towns of King Cove to Cold Bay. One such attempt proposed a land transfer of 43,000 acres (170 km^{2}) of land owned by the state of Alaska and the King Cove Corporation in exchange for construction of a single-lane 17-mile (27 km) road which would pass through Izembek NWR. Environmentalists contended the road threatens the population of the migratory black brant and other species. This attempted land transfer was ultimately blocked by the Department of the Interior in 2013.

In January 2018, the Trump administration proposed a different land transfer agreement. Nine environmental groups sued the administration one week later, arguing that the four-year environmental impact statement commissioned by the Department of the Interior had already determined that the road was unnecessary and would irreversibly damage the refuge. A ruling on March 29, 2019 by the United States District Court for the District of Alaska once again blocked the land transfer, finding that the Trump administration's attempts to remove acreage from the refuge contradicted the existing environmental impact statement and made no attempt to explain why the statement was no longer applicable. A second judge rejected a revised plan in June 2020. In November 2022, the U.S. Court of Appeals, Ninth District, overruled a 3-judge panel of the court and scheduled a rehearing of the case against the Trump administration proposal. In an unusual action, former President Jimmy Carter filed a statement of support for the motion for the rehearing, saying the swap violated the Alaska National Interest Lands Conservation Act (ANILCA). The act "may be the most significant domestic achievement of my political life", Carter said at the time of his filing.

In October 2025, Interior Secretary Doug Burgum during the second Trump administration said it would allow a gravel road to support oil drilling to be built through the refuge. In August 2026, a federal judge blocked the land exchange.

== Fauna ==
Izembek Wilderness hosts a quarter-million migratory birds every fall, including the entire world's population of black brants and thousands of Canada and emperor geese, Steller's eiders, and various species of duck and shorebird. Izembek Lagoon contains one of the largest eelgrass beds in the world, providing food and shelter for the birds. Izembek NWR is also host to many resident bird species, such as Tundra swans, which live on the refuge year-round. Raptors which prey on the many species of rodents, birds, and fish in this area include bald and golden eagles, rough-legged hawks, gyrfalcons, and Peale's peregrine falcons. Hundreds of thousands of salmon return to streams in the refuge each year.

Land mammals that roam this refuge include brown bears, red foxes, wolves, and caribou from the Southern Alaska Peninsula herd. Marine mammals are common in the productive waters surrounding this refuge. Harbor seals, Steller's sea lions, and sea otters and even walrus inhabit nearby coastal waters and lagoons. Harbor seals frequently haul out on sandbars in the lagoons and along the coast. Orcas, gray whales, and minke whales can sometimes be seen as they migrate along the shoreline and occasionally inside of Izembek Lagoon.

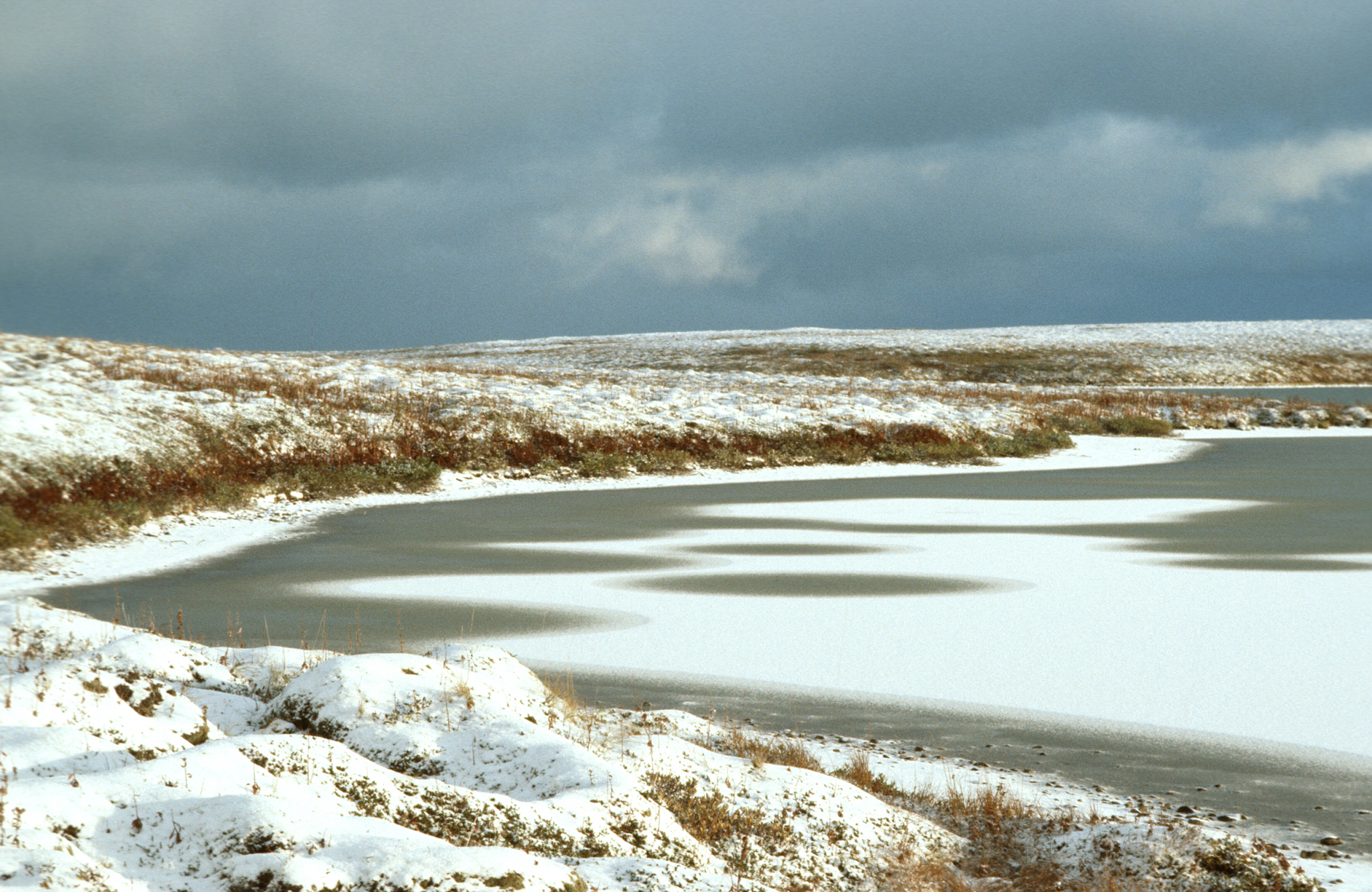
Wetlands of Izembek National Wildlife Refuge in early spring

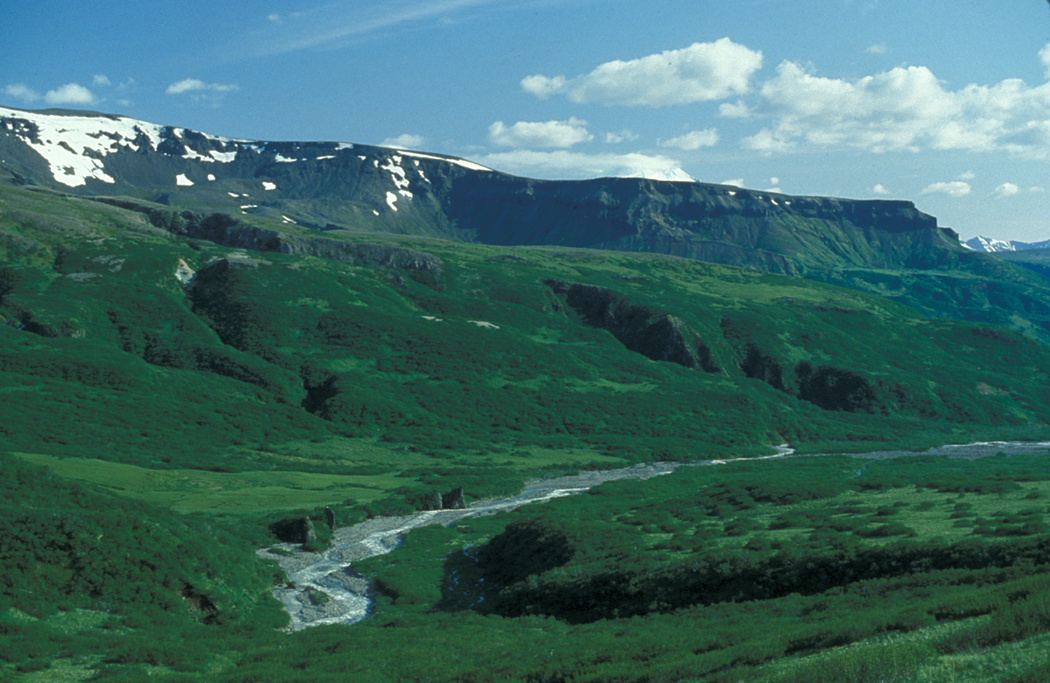
Lefthand Valley

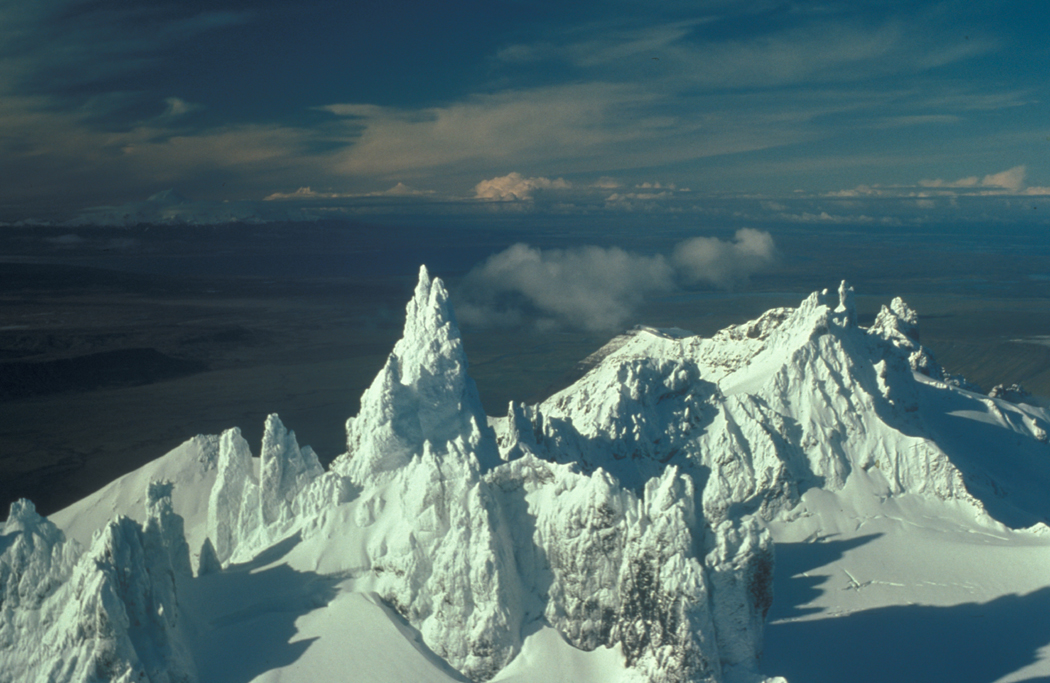
Aghileen Pinnacles

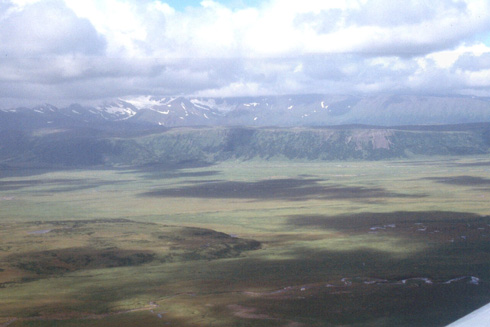
Joshua Green River Valley in Izembek Wilderness
