= Adamagan, Alaska =

Aleut archaeological site in Alaska, US

Coordinates: 55.109°N 163.198°W

Adamagan
- Location within Alaska
- Interactive map of Adamagan
- Location: Morzhovoi Bay, Alaska Peninsula

History
- Built: 1700 BC

Site notes
- Area: 37 acres (0.15 km^{2})

Adamagan was an Aleut village that, at its peak, had about 1000 residents and covered almost 37 acres, making it one of the largest villages in the ancient Arctic or subarctic. The site has over 250 winter houses, in addition to summer houses, underground storage pits, and many more smaller structures. "Adamagan" is the Aleut word for Morzhovoi Bay.

== History and culture ==
Adamagan was first occupied around 1700 BC, and had subsequent discontinuous occupations until around 1000 AD, although the peak population occurred between 400 BC and 100 AD. The people built dugouts for winter living, covered by whale bones as well as some peat or sod that would keep wind out. The villagers subsisted on marine mammals and fish that they hunted with harpoons. They also buried offerings under their house, believing it helped protect them as well as improve their chances of success during hunting. Use of labrets also became common during Adamagan's peak.

The site was excavated in 2000.
