= Port Moller, Alaska =

Unincorporated community in the state of Alaska, United States

Port Moller Putmaaluq
- Unincorporated area
- Location within Alaska
- Coordinates: 55°59′19″N 160°34′37″W
- Country: United States
- State: Alaska
- Borough: Aleutians East
- Elevation: 13 ft (4.0 m)
- Time zone: UTC-9 (Alaska (AKST))
  - Summer (DST): UTC-8 (ADT)
- Area code: 907
- GNIS feature ID: 1419074

Port Moller (Sugpiaq: Putmaaluq) is an unincorporated community in the Aleutians East Borough, Alaska. It is named after the bay of the same name, which was in turn named for the sloop Moller, used by Captain M.N. Staniukovich, of Captain Friedrich Benjamin von Lütke's expedition, to explore the bay in 1828.
