= King Cove, Alaska =

City in Alaska, United States

King Cove Agdaaĝux̂
- City
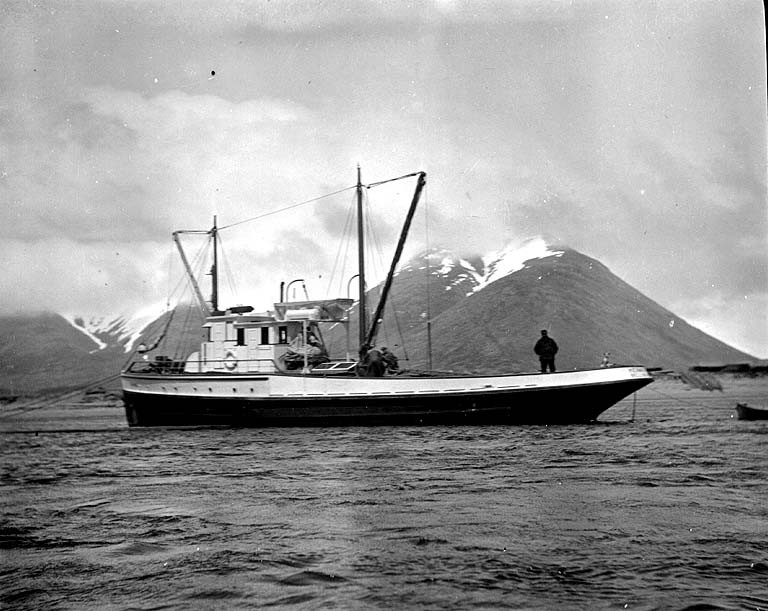
- Pacific American Fisheries cannery ship Kenmore in King Cove, May 1912

- Logo

- Location in Alaska
- Coordinates: 55°4′20″N 162°19′5″W
- Country: United States
- State: Alaska
- Borough: Aleutians East
- Incorporated: September 9, 1949

Government
  - Mayor: Warren Wilson
  - Borough mayor: Alvin D. Osterback
  - State senator: Lyman Hoffman (D)
  - State rep.: Bryce Edgmon (I)

Area
  - Total: 29.20 sq mi (75.62 km^{2})
  - Land: 24.66 sq mi (63.88 km^{2})
  - Water: 4.53 sq mi (11.74 km^{2})
- Elevation: 92 ft (28 m)

Population (2020)
  - Total: 757
  - Density: 30.7/sq mi (11.85/km^{2})
- Time zone: UTC-9 (Alaska (AKST))
  - Summer (DST): UTC-8 (AKDT)
- ZIP code: 99612
- Area code: 907
- FIPS code: 02-39410
- GNIS feature ID: 1418792
- Website: cityofkingcove.com

King Cove (Aleut: Agdaaĝux̂) is a city in Aleutians East Borough, Alaska, United States. As of the 2010 census, its population was 938, up from 792 in 2000, but at the 2020 census this had reduced to 757.

== Geography ==
King Cove is located at 55°04′20″N 162°19′05″W. King Cove is on the Pacific side of the Alaska Peninsula, near the tip of that peninsula. It is 18 miles (29 km) southeast of Cold Bay and 620 miles (1,000 km) southwest of Anchorage. It lies at approximately 55° 03′ N Latitude and 162° 19′ W Longitude. The area encompasses 2.9 square miles (8 km^{2}) of land and 2.0 square miles (5 km^{2}) of water.

According to the U.S. Census Bureau, the city has a total area of 29.8 square miles (77 km^{2}), of which, 25.3 square miles (66 km^{2}) is land and 4.5 square miles (12 km^{2}) (15.23%) is water.

== Demographics ==
Historical population
Census	Pop.	Note	%±
1940	135		—
1950	162		20.0%
1960	290		79.0%
1970	283		−2.4%
1980	460		62.5%
1990	451		−2.0%
2000	792		75.6%
2010	938		18.4%
2020	757		−19.3%
U.S. Decennial Census

King Cove first appeared on the 1940 U.S. Census as an unincorporated village. It formally incorporated in 1949.

=== 2020 census ===
As of the 2020 census, King Cove had a population of 757. The median age was 42.3 years. 13.6% of residents were under the age of 18, and 8.3% of residents were 65 years of age or older. For every 100 females there were 178.3 males, and for every 100 females age 18 and over there were 195.9 males age 18 and over.

0.0% of residents lived in urban areas, while 100.0% lived in rural areas.

There were 165 households in King Cove, of which 37.6% had children under the age of 18 living in them. Of all households, 39.4% were married-couple households, 23.6% were households with a male householder and no spouse or partner present, and 21.8% were households with a female householder and no spouse or partner present. About 29.1% of all households were made up of individuals, and 9.6% had someone living alone who was 65 years of age or older.

There were 208 housing units, of which 20.7% were vacant. The homeowner vacancy rate was 0.0%, and the rental vacancy rate was 17.6%.

Racial composition as of the 2020 census
Race	Number	Percent
White	213	28.1%
Black or African American	10	1.3%
American Indian and Alaska Native	327	43.2%
Asian	109	14.4%
Native Hawaiian and Other Pacific Islander	6	0.8%
Some other race	29	3.8%
Two or more races	63	8.3%
Hispanic or Latino (of any race)	43	5.7%

=== 2000 census ===
As of the census of 2000, there were 792 people, 170 households, and 116 families residing in the city. The population density was 31.3 inhabitants per square mile (12.1/km^{2}). There were 207 housing units at an average density of 8.2 units per square mile (3.2 units/km^{2}). The racial makeup of the city was 15.03% White, 1.64% Black or African American, 46.72% Native American, 26.77% Asian, 0.13% Pacific Islander, 5.93% from other races, and 3.79% from two or more races. 7.45% of the population were Hispanic or Latino of any race.

There were 170 households, out of which 45.3% had children under the age of 18 living with them, 46.5% were married couples living together, 15.9% had a female householder with no husband present, and 31.2% were non-families. 25.3% of all households were made up of individuals, and 2.9% had someone living alone who was 65 years of age or older. The average household size was 2.90, and the average family size was 3.53.

In the city, the age distribution of the population shows 21.3% under the age of 18, 11.9% from 18 to 24, 41.0% from 25 to 44, 22.7% from 45 to 64, and 3.0% who were 65 years of age or older. The median age was 35 years. For every 100 females, there were 147.5 males. For every 100 females age 18 and over, there were 166.2 males.

The median income for a household in the city was $45,893, and the median income for a family was $47,188. Males had a median income of $30,714 versus $19,125 for females. The per capita income for the city was $17,791. About 3.3% of families and 11.9% of the population were below the poverty line, including 1.7% of those under age 18 and 27.3% of those age 65 or over.

== Economy ==
King Cove's economy depends almost completely on the year-round commercial fishing and seafood processing industries. All five species of salmon are abundant in the waters near King Cove.

76 residents hold commercial fishing permits. Income is supplemented by subsistence activities.

=== Peter Pan Seafoods ===
The city was home to Peter Pan Seafoods' largest processing facility, one of the largest cannery operations under one roof in Alaska. The plant, with origins back to the early 1900s, had the largest salmon canning capacity of any plant in Alaska. At peak seasons, both winter and summer, nearly 500 employees staffed the operation.

King Crab, bairdi and opilio tanner crab, pollock, cod, salmon, halibut and black cod harvested in the Bering Sea and the Gulf of Alaska were processed by the plant throughout the year. Salmon remained a major part of the annual operation, but in recent years the plant had expanded and streamlined whitefish operations. The plant produced several product forms, including pollock fillet block, shatterpack fillets, mince and surimi. Cod shatterpack fillets and salt cod are mainstays.

In April 2024, Peter Pan Seafoods announced that the company would cease operations, including that of their King Cove plant. As of February 2025, with the plant still closed, the city was considering a major reduction in the next year’s budget, and asking the state for financial assistance. With families moving away, school enrollment was down 20 percent.

=== Current access to the mainland ===
The community is served by King Cove Airport, a state-owned public use airport with a gravel runway. A locally based FAA-certified Part 135 company called Eider Air provides on demand air-taxi service and charter operations to villagers and visitors. Grant Aviation also flies to King Cove and has the contract for mail services.

It is also served by the Alaska Marine Highway, the state-run ferry service which connects it with Cold Bay in the west and Sand Point in the east.

=== Proposed road to Cold Bay ===
A partially completed road between King Cove and Cold Bay is awaiting approval through the United States Department of the Interior. According to a report generated by The Wilderness Society, the road would cause irreparable damage to the Izembek National Wildlife Refuge. The previous negative decision by former Interior Secretary Sally Jewell is being reconsidered to include a land swap. Proponents of the road state it would help local citizens in need of medical evacuation when airplanes can not land or take off from the local airport due to darkness or weather conditions. Opponents contend the road's main purpose is, as it always has been, to provide a link between King Cove and a nearby airport for commercial reasons.

On January 22, 2018, Interior Secretary Ryan Zinke signed a land swap agreement to allow construction of the road, but U.S. District Court Judge Sharon Gleason blocked it in a ruling in March 2019, on the grounds that Zinke had failed to respond to the environmental concerns which Secretary Jewell had cited in justifying blocking the proposed land swap. In 2020, Zinke's successor as Interior Secretary, David Bernhardt, approved a revised land swap agreement, and specifically responded to those environmental concerns; U.S. District Court Judge John W. Sedwick blocked the revised land swap agreement as well, on the grounds that Bernhardt's response to the environmental issues was inadequate. In August 2020, the Trump administration appealed Judge Sedwick's ruling to the United States Court of Appeals for the Ninth Circuit.

In March 2021, the Biden administration announced that it would continue the appeal started by the Trump administration, contrary to the expectations of many observers, who assumed the Biden administration would take the opposite decision. A draft environmental impact statement, issued in November by the U.S. Fish and Wildlife Service and the Department of the Interior, supports a land exchange between the federal government and King Cove’s Native corporation to allow construction of a road through the Izembek National Wildlife Refuge.

== Healthcare ==
The King Cove Community Health Clinic is run by the Eastern Aleutian Tribes and provides routine medical care, behavioral health, and emergency care services. The clinic is open Monday through Friday during normal business hours closed for all Alaskan and Federal holidays. After hours emergencies are handled by on-call practitioners. There is an active local emergency medical services group that provides ambulance service. Care is also provided through Community Health Aide Practitioners, which are unique to Alaska.

== Education ==
Aleutians East Borough School District (AEBSD) operates the King Cove School.

As of 2019, the King Cove School had 13 teachers and approximately 85 students.
