= Eastern Aleutian Tribes =

Eastern Aleutian Tribes (EAT) was formed in 1991 and includes seven Aleut tribes from the Aleutian Islands and Alaska Peninsula.

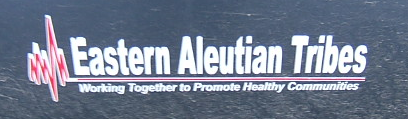
Company Logo on Side of Van

== Origins and development ==
Eastern Aleutian Tribes includes the Agdaagux Tribal Council (King Cove), Akutan Traditional Council (Akutan), Nelson Lagoon Tribal Council (Nelson Lagoon), Unga Tribal Council (Unga in Sand Point), Qagan Tayagungin Tribal Council (Sand Point), False Pass Tribal Council (False Pass) and the Pauloff Harbor Tribal Council (Sanak in Sand Point).

EAT provides medical, dental, optometric, and behavioral health services in federally qualified health centers in the communities of Adak, Akutan, Cold Bay, False Pass, King Cove, Nelson Lagoon, Sand Point, St. George, and Whittier. This comprises over 100,000 square miles of remote territory.

From its roots as a small Native health organization, EAT has matured into a progressive Native health organization within the Alaska Tribal Health System. EAT started out with a handful of employees and a budget under $500,000. It has grown into a corporation with over 100 employees and an operating budget of $9.2 million, offering professional health services utilizing physicians (MD's and DO's,) mid-level practitioners (PA's and NP's) and Community Health Aides / Practitioners. (CHaP's)

EAT intends to continue to improve services in all aspects of health care, supporting the well-being of the Aleut people.
