= Shumagin Islands =

Group of islands in Alaska, United States

Coordinates: 55°04′00″N 160°03′00″W

Location in Alaska

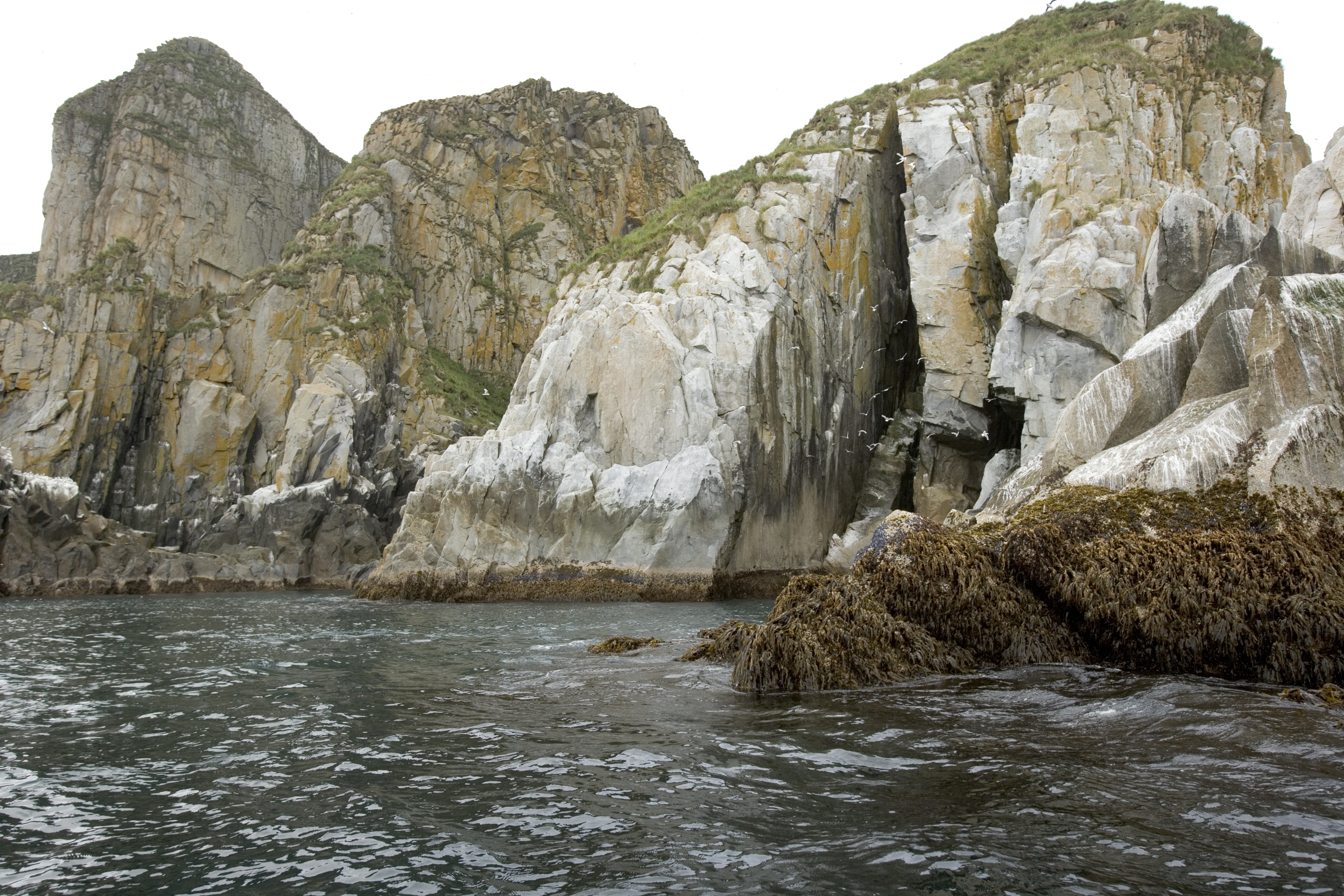
Castle Rock, Shumagin Islands

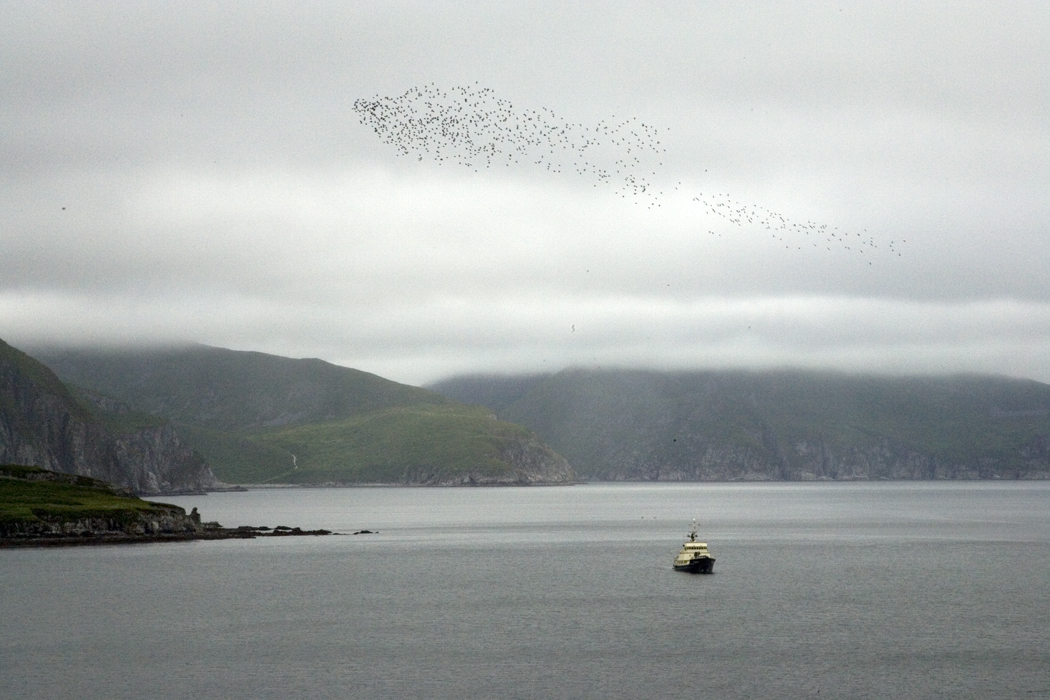
Shumagins, Big Koniuji Island with MV Tiglax

The Shumagin Islands (Unangan: Qagiiĝun; Russian: Острова Шумагина) are a group of 20 islands in the Aleutians East Borough south of the mainland of Alaska, United States, at 54°54'–55°20' North 159°15'–160°45' West. The largest islands are Unga Island, Popof Island, Korovin Island, and Nagai Island. Other islands include Andronica, Big Koniuji, Little Koniuji, Simeonof, Chernabura, and Bird. The total land area is 1,192.369 km^{2} (460.376 sq mi) and their total population as of the 2020 census was 578 persons, almost entirely in the city of Sand Point, on Popof Island.

The Shumagin Islands were named after Nikita Shumagin, one of the sailors on Vitus Bering's 1741 expedition to North America who died of scurvy and was buried on Nagai Island.
