= Popof Island =

Island in Aleutians East Borough, Alaska, United States

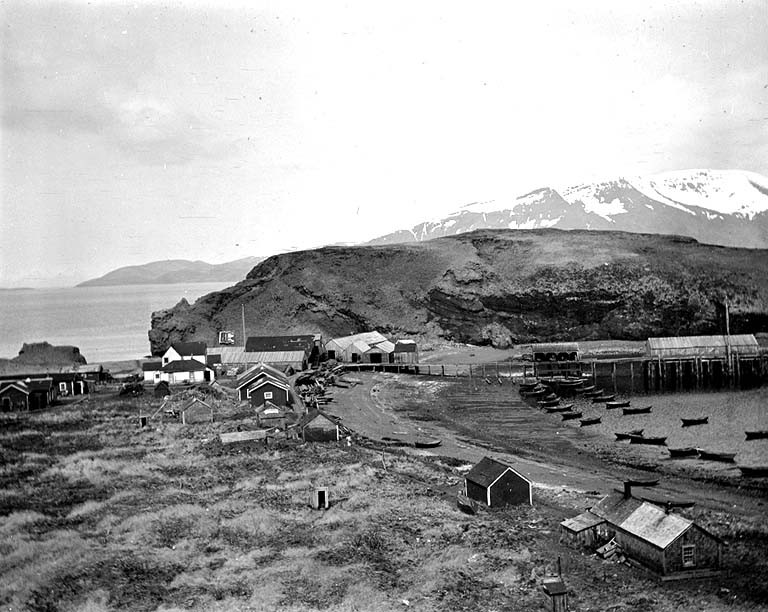
Union Fish Company codfish station at Pirate Cove on Popof Island

Popof Island (Siitikdax̂ in Aleut) is an island in the Shumagin Islands south of mainland Alaska. The largest community in the area, Sand Point, is located on the northwest coast. Popof Island is 10 miles (16 km) long, 5 miles (8.0 km) wide and the peak elevation is 1,550 feet (470 meters). It is located at 55°18′49″N 160°22′29″W. It has a land area of 93.651 km^{2} (36.159 sq mi) and a total population of 578 persons at the 2020 census.

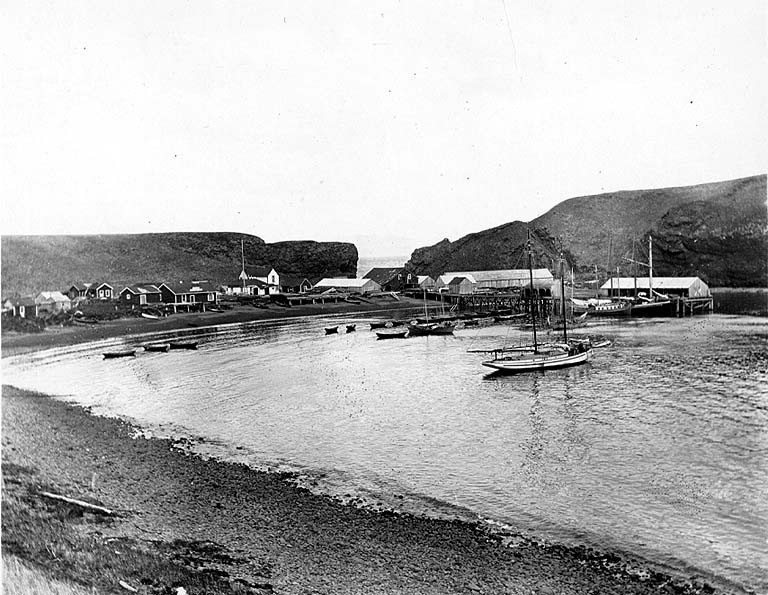
Codfish station at Pirate Cove, June 1912

Pirate Cove on the island was developed as a major codfish fishing station.

A herd of introduced bison is on the uninhabited side of the island and currently numbers about 120.

== Demographics ==
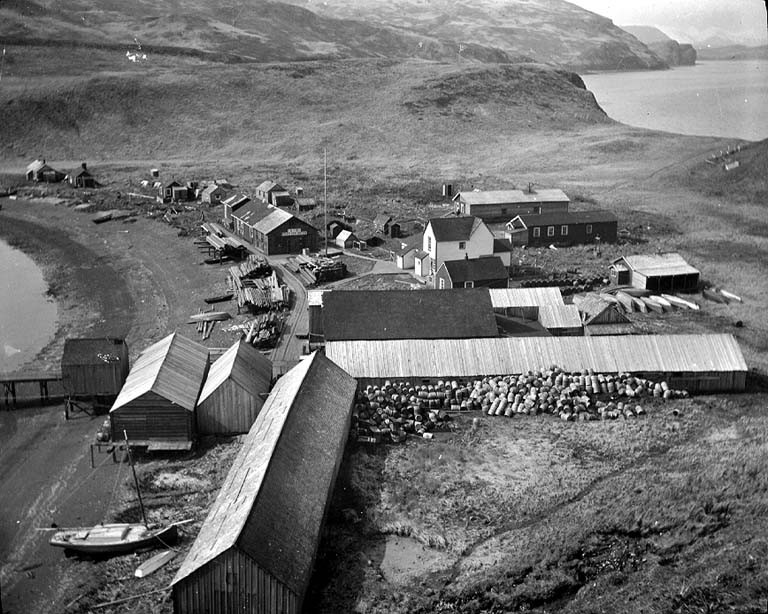
Union Fisch Co. codfish station at Pirate Cove on Popof Island, June 1912

Historical population
Census	Pop.	Note	%±
1890	146		—
U.S. Decennial Census

Popof Island first appeared as a separate political entity on the 1890 U.S. Census with a population of 146. Of these, 135 were White, 7 were Creole (Mixed Russian & Native), 3 were Asian and 1 was Native. This included 3 settlements on the island: Pirate Cove (a codfishing Station), which had previously appeared on the 1880 census separately with 7 residents (all White), located on the northeast side of the island; Red Cove (a fishing station) on the south side of the island; and Sand Point Station on the northwestern side of the island. Census enumerators also counted all the ships that were docked at Pirate Cove (including schooners Trapper and Unga) and those at Sand Point (including schooners Alexandria, City of San Diego, James Hamilton, Kate and Annie, San Diego, C.N. Smart & C.H. White).

Beginning in 1900, Popof Island villages reported separately. Red Cove was abandoned. Pirate Cove appeared once more on the 1920 census (population 98) before it was abandoned. Sand Point became the dominant village on the island, growing from 16 residents in 1900 to 976 by 2010, but was reduced to 578 at the 2020 Census. It incorporated as a city in 1966 and became important enough to be made the equivalent of county seat (borough seat) for the Aleutians East in 1987. As of 2000, all residents of Popof Island reside within the city limits of Sand Point.
