= Nagai Island =

Island in Alaska, United States

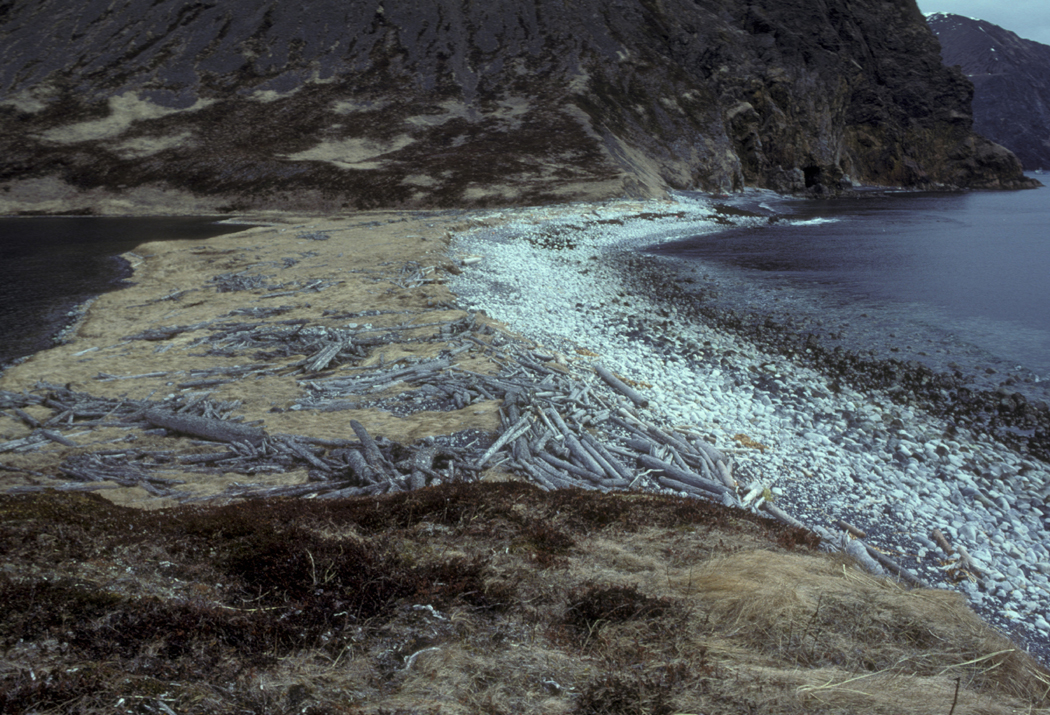
Shumagin Islands, Nagai Island, 1985

Nagai Island is one of the largest of the Shumagin Islands in the Gulf of Alaska, south of the Alaska Peninsula considered a part of the NE Aleutian Range. It is located in the United States state of Alaska at 55°05′N 160°01′W, and is 31 miles (50 km) long.

According to the log of Vitus Bering's ship St. Peter, a sailor by the name of Nikita Shumagin died of scurvy and was buried here August 31, 1741. The Shumagin Islands were named after him.
