= Aleutians East Borough, Alaska =

Borough in Alaska, United States

- Borough
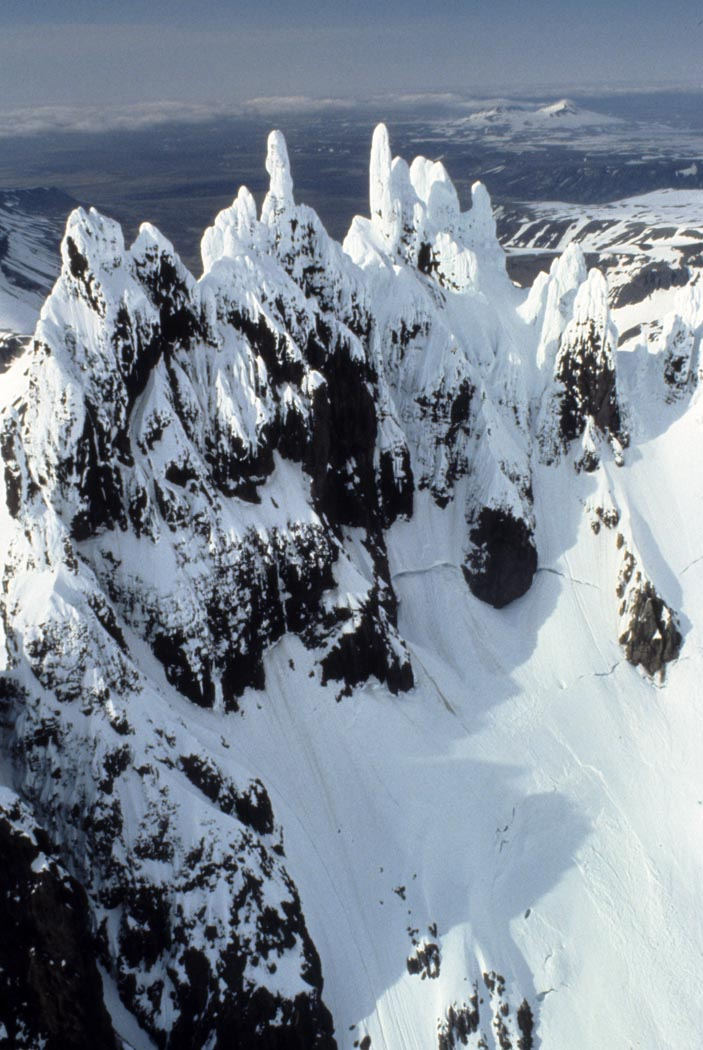
- Aghileen Pinnacles Mountains in Izembek National Wildlife Refuge.

- Logo

- Location within the U.S. state of Alaska
- Coordinates: 55°14′N 161°55′W
- Country: United States
- State: Alaska
- Incorporated: October 23, 1987
- Named for: Aleutian Islands
- Seat: Sand Point
- Largest city: Akutan

Government
  - Mayor: Alvin D. Osterback

Area
  - Total: 15,010 sq mi (38,900 km^{2})
  - Land: 6,982 sq mi (18,080 km^{2})
  - Water: 8,028 sq mi (20,790 km^{2}) 53.5%

Population (2020)
  - Total: 3,420
  - Estimate (2025): 3,479 ▲
  - Density: 0.490/sq mi (0.189/km^{2})
- Time zone: UTC−9 (Alaska)
  - Summer (DST): UTC−8 (ADT)
- Congressional district: At-large
- Website: www.aleutianseast.org

Aleutians East Borough (/əˈljuːʃənz/ (Note: "Aleutian". Oxford Dictionaries UK English Dictionary. Oxford University Press.)) is a 2nd class borough in the U.S. state of Alaska. As of the 2020 census the borough's population was 3,420. The borough seat is Sand Point.

== History ==
According to archaeological evidence, the area has been inhabited by the Aleuts since the last ice age. Early contact was with Russian fur traders who sought sea otters in these islands. Whaling, fishing and cannery operations brought an influx of Scandinavian and European fishermen in the early 1900s. During World War II, the area was a strategic military site for the Aleutian Campaign, and many locals were evacuated to Ketchikan.

== Geography ==
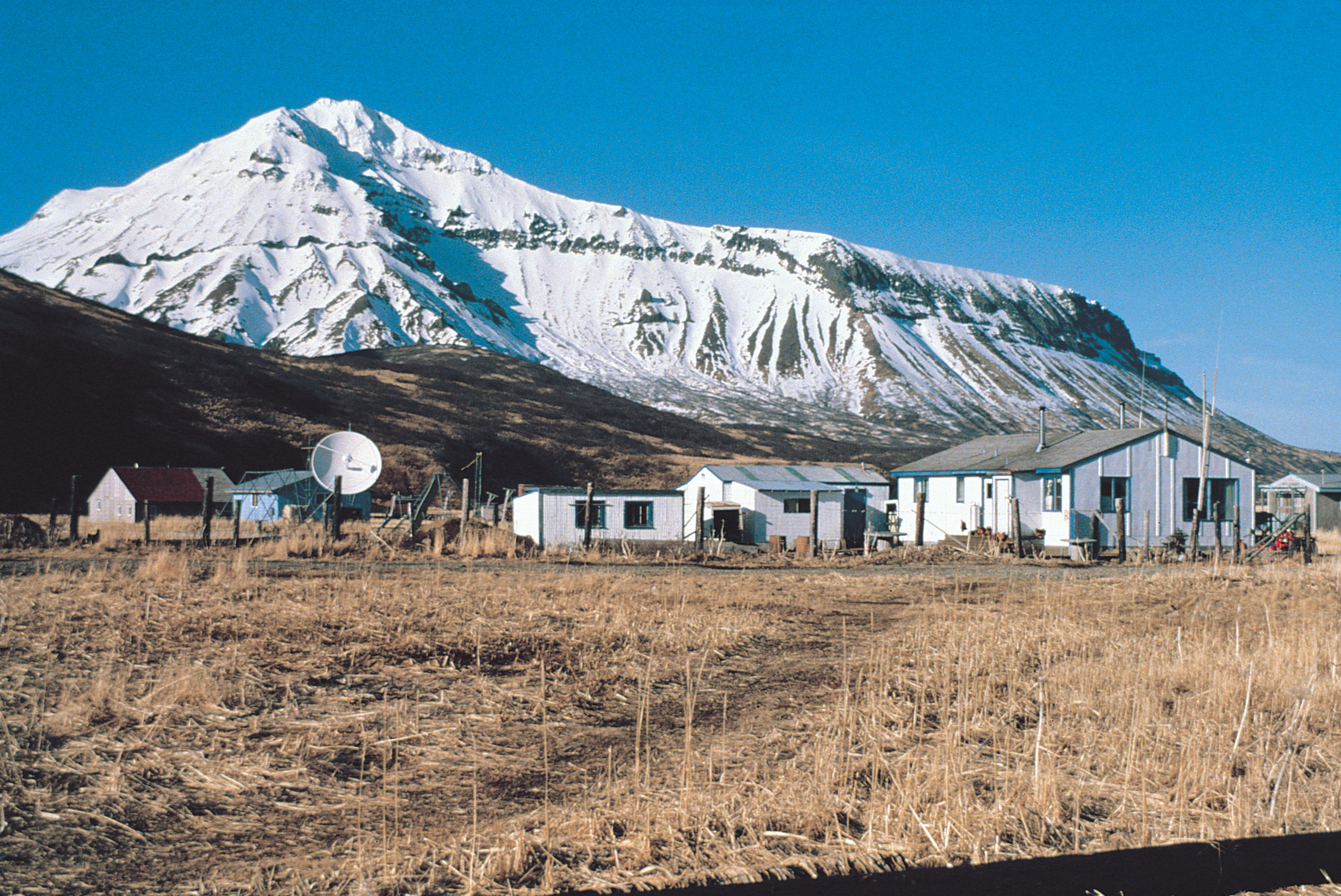
An area in the city of False Pass, Alaska, looking north.

According to the U.S. Census Bureau, the borough has a total area of 15,010 square miles (38,900 km^{2}), of which 6,982 square miles (18,080 km^{2}) is land and 8,028 square miles (20,790 km^{2}) (53.5%) is water.

Aleutians East Borough is located at 57° north latitude and 162° west longitude. It comprises the westernmost portion of the Alaska Peninsula, and a small number of the Aleutian Islands, from which the borough name derives. Also included are the Shumagin Islands, as well as the Pavlof Islands and the Sanak Islands. In all, about 63.9 percent of its land area comprises land on the Alaska Peninsula, while 36.1 percent is on the numerous islands. There are five incorporated cities and two unincorporated villages within the borough.

Temperatures range from -9 to 76 degrees Fahrenheit. Annual precipitation is 33 inches and annual snowfall is 52 inches.

=== National protected areas ===
- Alaska Maritime National Wildlife Refuge (parts of the Alaska Peninsula and Aleutian Islands units)
  - Aleutian Islands Wilderness (part)
  - Simeonof Wilderness
  - Unimak Wilderness
- Alaska Peninsula National Wildlife Refuge (part)
- Izembek National Wildlife Refuge
  - Izembek Wilderness

=== Adjacent boroughs and census areas ===
- Lake and Peninsula Borough, Alaska to the east
- Aleutians West Census Area, Alaska to the west

== Demographics ==
Historical population
Census	Pop.	Note	%±
1990	2,464		—
2000	2,697		9.5%
2010	3,141		16.5%
2020	3,420		8.9%
2025 (est.)	3,479	▲	1.7%
U.S. Decennial Census; 1990-2000 2010-2018

=== 2020 census ===
As of the 2020 census, the borough had a population of 3,420, yielding a population density of 0.49 people per square mile. The median age was 40.8 years, 8.8% of residents were under the age of 18, and 6.9% were 65 years of age or older. For every 100 females there were 226.0 males, and for every 100 females age 18 and over there were 243.2 males age 18 and over.

The racial makeup of the borough was 20.0% White, 8.7% Black or African American, 23.5% American Indian and Alaska Native, 22.5% Asian, 0.9% Native Hawaiian and Pacific Islander, 18.3% from some other race, and 6.1% from two or more races. Hispanic or Latino residents of any race comprised 19.7% of the population.

There were 483 households, of which 36.6% had children under the age of 18 living with them and 19.5% had a female householder with no spouse or partner present. About 26.1% of all households were made up of individuals, 9.7% had someone living alone who was 65 years of age or older, and the average household size was 2.61 people.

There were 679 housing units, of which 28.9% were vacant. Among occupied housing units, 63.1% were owner-occupied and 36.9% were renter-occupied. The homeowner vacancy rate was 0.0% and the rental vacancy rate was 11.2%.

0.0% of residents lived in urban areas, while 100.0% lived in rural areas.

=== Racial and ethnic composition ===
Aleutians East Borough, Alaska – Racial and ethnic composition Note: the US Census treats Hispanic/Latino as an ethnic category. This table excludes Latinos from the racial categories and assigns them to a separate category. Hispanics/Latinos may be of any race.
Race / Ethnicity (NH = Non-Hispanic)	Pop 1990	Pop 2000	Pop 2010	Pop 2020	% 1990	% 2000	% 2010	% 2020
White alone (NH)	801	521	425	658	32.51%	19.32%	13.53%	19.24%
Black or African American alone (NH)	15	42	212	297	0.61%	1.56%	6.75%	8.68%
Native American or Alaska Native alone (NH)	1,040	999	869	797	42.21%	37.04%	27.67%	23.30%
Asian alone (NH)	423	712	1,113	771	17.17%	26.40%	35.43%	22.54%
Native Hawaiian or Pacific Islander alone (NH)	x	8	19	32	x	0.30%	0.60%	0.94%
Other race alone (NH)	5	3	1	11	0.20%	0.11%	0.03%	0.32%
Mixed race or Multiracial (NH)	x	73	117	180	x	2.71%	3.72%	5.26%
Hispanic or Latino (any race)	180	339	385	674	7.31%	12.57%	12.26%	19.71%
Total	2,464	2,697	3,141	3,420	100.00%	100.00%	100.00%	100.00%

Top 11 Most Reported Detailed Ancestries in Aleutians East Borough (2020 United States Census)
Ancestry	% of Population
Filipino	11.2%
Aleut	5.8%
Qagan Tayagungin Tribe of Sand Point Village	5.8%
Agdaagux Tribe of King Cove	4.2%
Mexican	3.3%
Ukrainian	3.1%
Puerto Rican	2.6%
Native Village of Akutan	2%
English	1.8%
German	1.5%
Pauloff Harbor Village	1.5%

=== 2000 census ===
At the 2000 census there were 2,697 people, 526 households, and 344 families residing in the borough. The population density was 0.386 people per square mile (0.149 people/km^{2}). There were 724 housing units at an average density of 0 per square mile (0/km^{2}). The racial makeup of the borough was 23.95% White, 1.67% Black or African American, 37.26% Native American, 26.51% Asian, 0.30% Pacific Islander, 7.38% from other races, and 2.93% from two or more races. 12.57% were Hispanic or Latino of any race. 22.25% reported speaking Tagalog at home, while 13.03% speak Spanish, 2.00% speak Ilokano, and 1.20% Aleut.

Of the 526 households 39.20% had children under the age of 18 living with them, 44.10% were married couples living together, 14.40% had a female householder with no husband present, and 34.60% were non-families. 27.40% of households were one person and 3.40% were one person aged 65 or older. The average household size was 2.69 and the average family size was 3.30.

The age distribution was 16.80% under the age of 18, 10.20% from 18 to 24, 42.30% from 25 to 44, 28.10% from 45 to 64, and 2.60% 65 or older. The median age was 37 years. For every 100 females, there were 184.80 males. For every 100 females age 18 and over, there were 207.70 males.

A 2014 analysis by The Atlantic found Aleutians East Borough to be the second most racially diverse county-equivalent in the United States, behind the Aleutians West Census Area.

== Government and politics ==
Alvin D. Osterback is the mayor of the Aleutians East Borough. The borough has an elected assembly. Members of the assembly are Warren Wilson (King Cove), Paul Gronholdt (Sand Point), Chris Babcock (King Cove), Brenda Wilson (King Cove), Carol Foster (Sand Point), Josephine Shangin (Akutan), and Denise Mobeck (Sand Point). There are three advisory members, Dailey Schaack (Cold Bay), Samantha McNeley (Nelson Lagoon), and Tom Hoblet (False Pass). There is also an elected school board.

There are seven schools located in the Borough, with 273 students enrolled.

The Sand Point Clinic is managed by Eastern Aleutian Tribes, Inc. and inhabited a new facility in 2006. The clinic is staffed by low-level professionals and Community Health Aide/Practitioners (CHAs). The CHA role is unique to Alaska and Native Health Care.

Aleutians East Borough is a Republican stronghold. It has supported Republican presidential candidates in every election since 1964, often by margins of over 60%, although Bob Dole only defeated Bill Clinton by 10 votes in 1996.

United States presidential election results for Aleutians East Borough, Alaska
Year	Republican		Democratic		Third party(ies)	
Year	No.	%	No.	%	No.	%
1960	72	30.00%	168	70.00%	0	0.00%
1964	60	17.60%	281	82.40%	0	0.00%
1968	160	50.79%	120	38.10%	35	11.11%
1972	181	65.34%	86	31.05%	10	3.61%
1976	198	63.87%	106	34.19%	6	1.94%
1980	207	47.81%	138	31.87%	88	20.32%
1984	367	72.96%	121	24.06%	15	2.98%
1988	321	65.91%	152	31.21%	14	2.87%
1992	300	50.25%	164	27.47%	133	22.28%
1996	249	46.72%	239	44.84%	45	8.44%
2000	447	73.28%	112	18.36%	51	8.36%
2004	314	74.41%	98	23.22%	10	2.37%
2008	447	66.12%	205	30.33%	24	3.55%
2012	292	53.19%	234	42.62%	23	4.19%
2016	305	55.76%	172	31.44%	70	12.80%
2020	336	61.31%	180	32.85%	32	5.84%
2024	288	66.67%	125	28.94%	19	4.40%

== Economy ==
The borough's economy is cash-based. Commercial fishing and fish processing dominate and occur almost year-round. 222 borough residents hold commercial fishing permits. Sand Point is home to the largest fishing fleet in the Aleutian Chain. Salmon and Pacific cod processing occur at Peter Pan Seafoods (Port Moller and King Cove), Trident Seafoods (Sand Point and Akutan), and Bering Pacific (False Pass). The Peter Pan cannery in King Cove is one of the largest operations under one roof in Alaska. Transportation and other services provide year-round employment.

== Transportation ==
Several airports are accessible in the Borough, and float planes can land in many communities. Marine cargo vessels also provide transportation. The State Ferry operates during the summer. Local transportation is primarily by fishing boats or skiffs since there are no roads.

== Communities ==
=== Cities ===
- Akutan
- Cold Bay
- False Pass
- King Cove
- Sand Point (Borough seat)

=== Census-designated place ===
- Nelson Lagoon

=== Unincorporated communities ===
- Pauloff Harbor
- Belkofski
- Ikatan
- Morzhovoi

=== Ghost towns ===
- Unga
- Adamagan

=== Census Subareas ===
- Aleutians East

== See also ==
- List of airports in the Aleutians East Borough
- National Register of Historic Places listings in Aleutians East Borough, Alaska
