= List of airports in the Marshall Islands =

This list of airports in Marshall Islands is sorted by location. For a list sorted by ICAO code, see List of airports by ICAO code: P#PK - Marshall Islands.

== List of airports ==
ATOLL / ISLAND	ISLET / VILLAGE	IATA	ICAO	FAA	AIRPORT
					Civilian Airports
Ailinglaplap Atoll	Ailinglaplap	AIC			Ailinglaplap Airok Airport
Ailinglaplap Atoll	Jeh	JEJ			Jeh Airport
Ailinglaplap Atoll	Woja	WJA			Woja Airport
Ailuk Atoll	Ailuk	AIM			Ailuk Airport
Arno Atoll	Ine	IMI		N20	Ine Airport
Arno Atoll	Tinak	TIC		N18	Tinak Airport
Aur Atoll	Aur	AUL			Aur Airport
Bikini Atoll	Enyu	BII			Bikini Atoll Airport (Enyu Airport)
Ebon Atoll	Ebon	EBO			Ebon Airport
Enewetak Atoll	Enewetak	ENT	PKMA		Enewetak Auxiliary Airfield
Jabat Island	Jabot	JAT			Jabot Airport
Jaluit Atoll	Jabor	UIT		N55	Jaluit Airport
Kili Island	Kili	KIO		Q51	Kili Airport
Kwajalein Atoll	Ebadon	EBN			Ebadon Airstrip
Kwajalein Atoll	Elenak	EAL			Elenak Airport
Lae Atoll	Lae	LML			Lae Airport
Likiep Atoll	Likiep	LIK			Likiep Airport
Majuro Atoll	Majuro	MAJ	PKMJ	MAJ	Marshall Islands International Airport (Amata Kabua Int’l)
Maloelap Atoll	Kaben Island	KBT			Kaben Airport
Maloelap Atoll	Taroa Island	MAV		3N1	Maloelap Airport
Mejit Island	Mejit	MJB		Q30	Mejit Airport
Mili Atoll	Enejit	EJT			Enejit Airport
Mili Atoll	Mili	MIJ		1Q9	Mili Airport
Namdrik Atoll	Namdrik	NDK		3N0	Namorik Airport (Namdrik Airport)
Namu Atoll	Majkin	MJE			Majkin Airport
Rongelap Atoll	Rongelap	RNP			Rongelap Airport
Ujae Atoll	Ujae	UJE			Ujae Airport
Utirik Atoll	Utirik	UTK		03N	Utirik Airport
Wotho Atoll	Wotho	WTO			Wotho Airport
Wotje Atoll	Wotje	WTE		N36	Wotje Airport
					Military Airports
Kwajalein Atoll	Kwajalein	KWA	PKWA	KWA	Bucholz Army Airfield
Kwajalein Atoll	Meck Island				Meck Airstrip
Kwajalein Atoll	Roi-Namur		PKRO	ROI	Freeflight International Airport (Dyess Army Airfield)
