= Maloelap Airport =

Airport in Marshall Islands

Maloelap Airport Taroa Airfield
- IATA: MAV; ICAO: none; FAA LID: 3N1

Summary
- Elevation AMSL: 4 ft (1.2 m)
- Coordinates: 8°42′18″N 171°13′50″E
- Interactive map of Maloelap Airport

Runways
| Direction | Length | | Surface |
| Direction | ft | m | Surface |
|---|---|---|---|
| 04/22 | 3,500 | 1,067 | turf |
- Source: Federal Aviation Administration

Maloelap Airport is a public use airport located on Taroa Island in Maloelap Atoll, Marshall Islands. This airport is assigned the location identifier 3N1 by the FAA and MAV by the IATA.

== Facilities ==
Maloelap Airport is at an elevation of 4 feet (1.2 m) above mean sea level. The runway is designated 04/22 with a turf surface measuring 3,500 by 150 feet (1,067 x 46 m). There are no aircraft based at Maloelap.

== History ==
During World War II, Taroa Airfield was a major Japanese airbase approximately three miles long and one mile wide. The airfield was Japan's easternmost airbase of the War. Heavily bombed during the war, it was a favorite target for bombers from Makin Airfield, Tarawa and Abemama. Remnants of the airbase, defenses, and battles can still be found on the island; about 1,200 feet from the southwest end of the airport lies the wreck of the Toreshima Maru, a Japanese supply ship sunk in December 1943.

== Airlines and destinations ==
Air Marshall Islands connects Maloelap Airport to Aur Airport and Marshall Islands International Airport (Majuro).

== See also ==
- Taroa Airfield
