= USS Belleau Wood (CVL-24) =

Independence-class light aircraft carrier of the US Navy

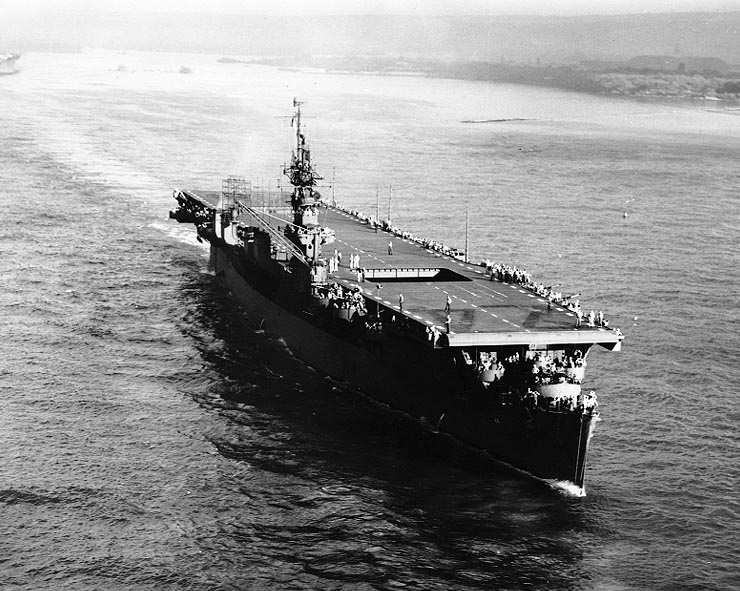
- USS Belleau Wood December 1943

History

United States
- Name: Belleau Wood
- Namesake: Battle of Belleau Wood
- Builder: New York Shipbuilding Corporation
- Laid down: 11 August 1941
- Launched: 6 December 1942
- Commissioned: 31 March 1943
- Decommissioned: 13 January 1947
- Stricken: 1 October 1960
- Honors and awards: Presidential Unit Citation; 12 battle stars
- Fate: Sold for scrapping 21 November 1960

France
- Name: Bois Belleau
- Commissioned: 23 December 1953
- Decommissioned: 12 December 1960
- Fate: Returned to US, September 1960

General characteristics
- Class & type: Independence-class aircraft carrier
- Displacement: Full load: 14,751 long tons (14,988 t)
- Length: 622 feet 6 inches (189.74 m)
- Beam: 71 ft 6 in (21.79 m) (waterline)
- Draft: 24 ft 3 in (7.39 m)
- Installed power: 4 × Babcock & Wilcox boilers; 100,000 shp (75,000 kW)
- Propulsion: 4 × steam turbines; 4 × screw propellers
- Speed: 31.6 kn (58.5 km/h; 36.4 mph)
- Complement: 1,569 officers and men
- Armament: 24 × Bofors 40 mm (1.6 in) guns; 22 × 20 mm (0.79 in) Oerlikon autocannon
- Aircraft carried: 12 × fighters; 9 × dive bombers; 9 × torpedo bombers

USS Belleau Wood was a United States Navy Independence-class light aircraft carrier active during World War II in the Pacific Theater from 1943 to 1945. The Independence class were ordered as light cruisers of the Cleveland class, but during construction, they were converted into light carriers owing to the need for additional vessels of that type during the war. The ship was originally named New Haven, but was renamed Belleau Wood after conversion work had begun, after the Battle of Belleau Wood of World War I.

Belleau Wood saw extensive action during World War II, participating in the Gilbert and Marshall Islands campaigns in late 1943 and early 1944, and the Mariana and Palau Islands campaign in mid-1944. There, she saw action at the Battle of the Philippine Sea, where her aircraft contributed to the sinking of the Japanese carrier Hiyō. She fought in the Philippines campaign later that year, and saw action at the Battle of Leyte Gulf. Shortly thereafter, she was damaged by a kamikaze. After repairs, she supported the invasion of Iwo Jima in March 1945 and operations against the Japanese Home Islands. After the war, she participated in Operation Magic Carpet missions before being placed in reserve in 1947.

The ship was loaned to the French Marine Nationale in the 1950s and served in the First Indochina War. During this period, she was renamed Bois Belleau, the French equivalent of her original name. The ship was returned to the United States in 1960, but was not retained in US Navy service; she was instead broken up for scrap that same year.

== Design ==
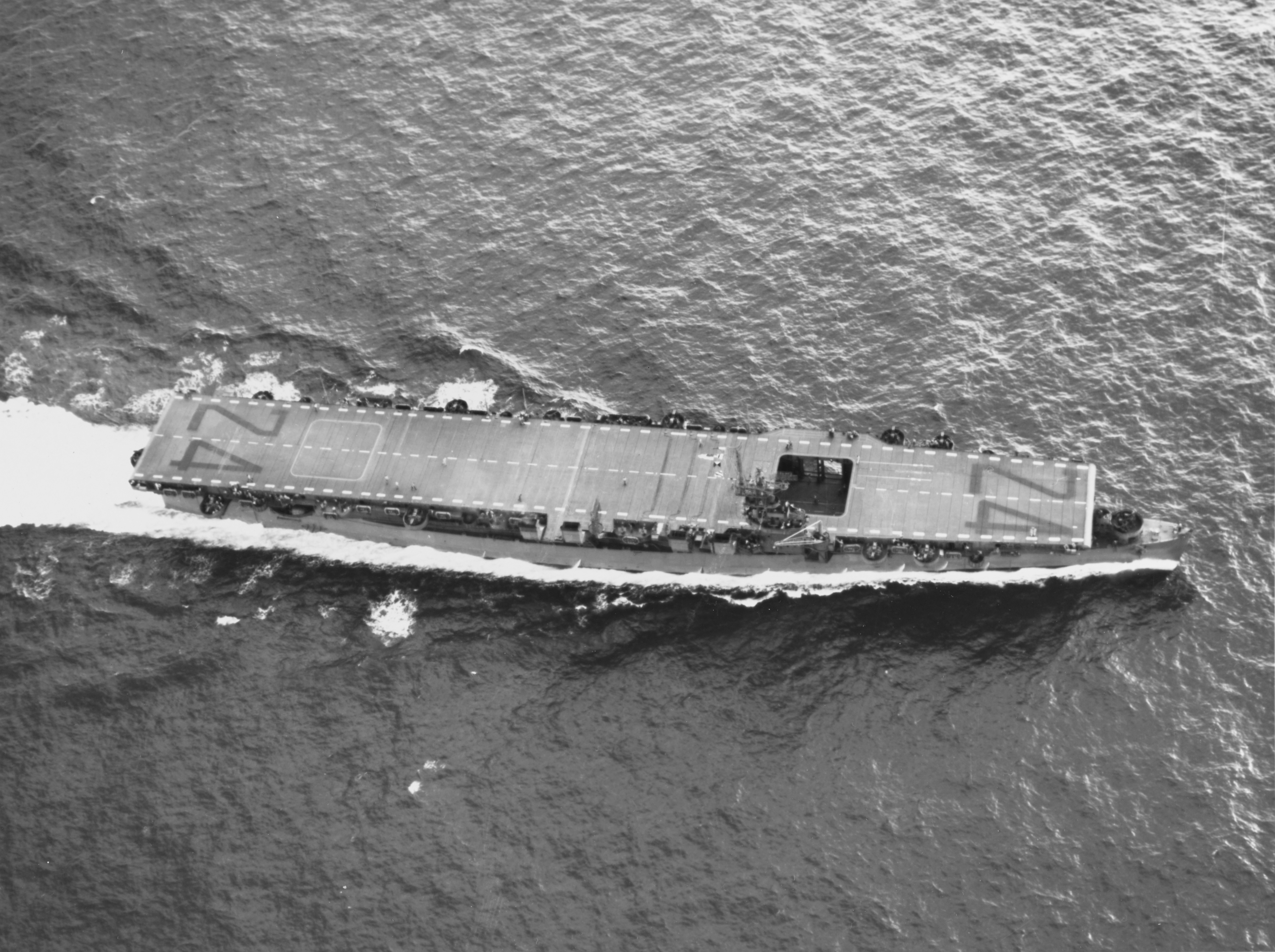
Overhead view of Belleau Wood in 1943, showing the general arrangement of the ship's deck, island, and defensive armament

The Independence class of light carriers came about as a result of a decision made in 1942 to convert a number of Cleveland-class light cruisers then under construction. At the time, senior leaders in the US Navy had concluded that no new fleet carriers would enter service before 1944, when the first Essex-class aircraft carriers would be completed. Therefore, they hoped that converting ships already being built would provide reinforcements for the fleet's carrier force. Ironically, USS Essex was completed in December 1942, two months before Independence entered service.

Belleau Wood was 622 feet 6 inches (189.74 m) long overall and had a beam of 71 ft 6 in (21.79 m) and a draft of 24 ft 3 in (7.39 m). Her standard displacement amounted to 10,662 long tons (10,833 t) and increased to 14,751 long tons (14,988 t) at full load. Her superstructure consisted of a small island style conning tower on the starboard side of the flight deck. Her crew numbered 1569 officers and enlisted men.

The Independence-class carriers were powered by four General Electric steam turbines, each driving one propeller shaft, using steam provided by four oil-fired Babcock & Wilcox boilers. Each boiler was vented through its own small funnel, each of which was placed on the starboard side, directly behind the island. Rated at 100,000 shaft horsepower (75,000 kW), the turbines were intended to give a top speed of 31.6 knots (58.5 km/h; 36.4 mph).

The ship's flight deck was 552 ft (168 m) long, and it was fitted with two elevators. She carried a total of thirty aircraft, divided into twelve fighters, nine dive bombers, and nine torpedo bombers. For self defense, Belleau Wood carried an anti-aircraft battery of twenty-four 40 mm (1.6 in) Bofors guns, which were carried in two quadruple and eight twin mounts, along with twenty-two 20 mm (0.79 in) Oerlikon autocannon, all in individual mounts. These guns were primarily distributed along the length of the flight deck, though the quad 40 mm guns were placed on the main deck, on either end of the flight deck.

== Service history ==
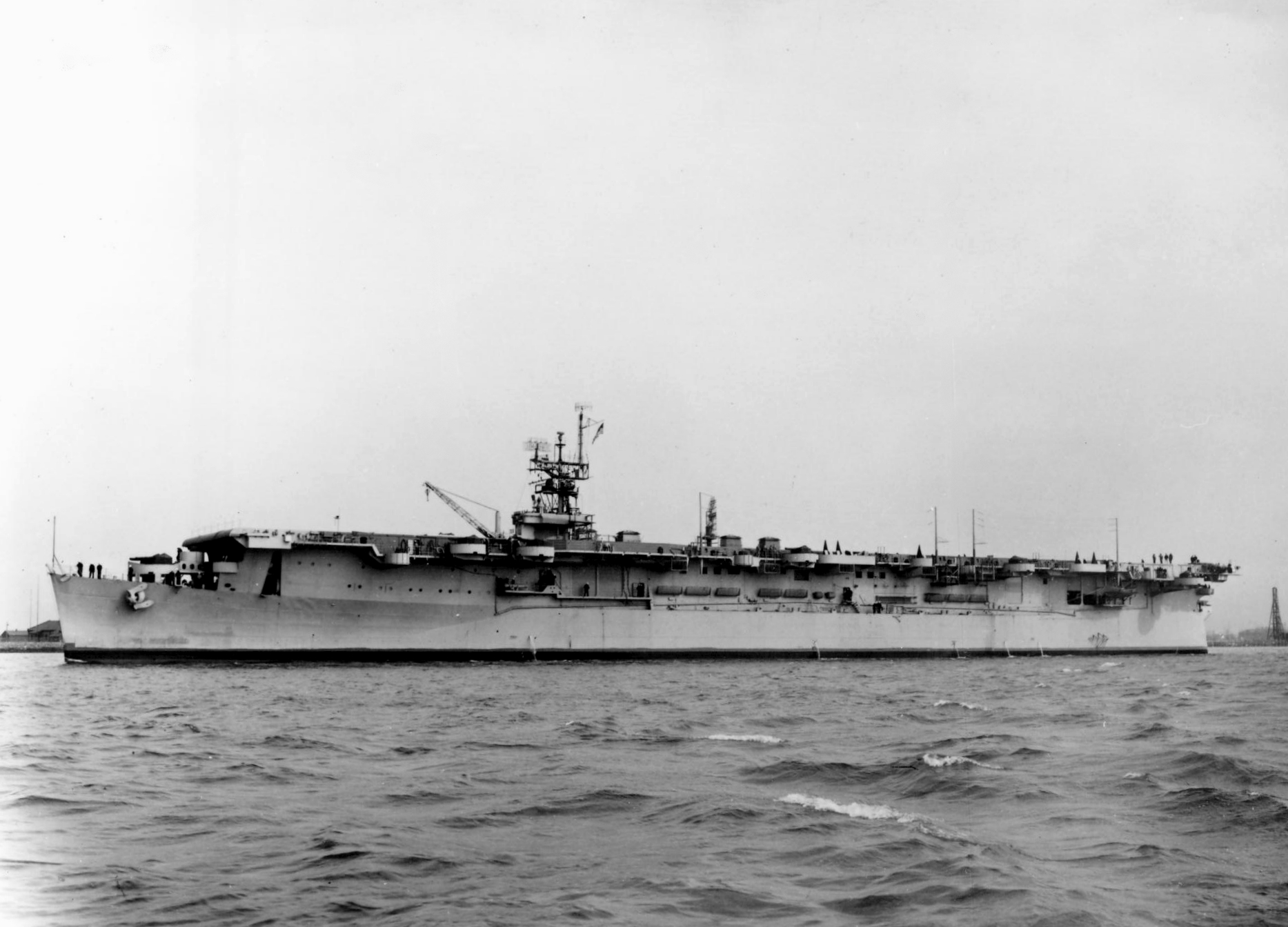
Belleau Wood off Philadelphia Navy Yard, 18 April 1943

=== United States Navy ===
==== Construction and initial service ====
The keel for Belleau Wood was laid down on 11 August 1941 at the New York Shipbuilding Corporation. She was originally ordered as a Cleveland-class cruiser under the name New Haven, which was to be designated with the hull number CL-76. Starting in January 1942, President Franklin Delano Roosevelt ordered the first of several of the new cruisers to be converted into light carriers, and New Haven was among those selected for conversion on 10 February. On 31 March, the ship was renamed Belleau Wood, after the Battle of Belleau Wood, a major battle fought by the Marine Corps during World War I. She also received an updated hull number: CV-24. The third member of what was now the Independence class of light carriers, the ship was launched on 6 December 1942, and after completing fitting out work, the ship, now renamed Belleau Wood, was commissioned on 31 March 1943.

Beginning in late May, Belleau Wood got underway for initial training in Chesapeake Bay, before a brief stay at the Norfolk Naval Shipyard in Norfolk, Virginia. On 8 June, she sailed to begin her shakedown cruise in the West Indies. She stopped in Port of Spain, Trinidad and Tobago, on 13 June, and thereafter conducted various training exercises, including damage control practice, flight training, and tactical maneuvers in the Gulf of Paria. She sailed back to the United States in early July, arriving in Philadelphia on 3 July. There, she underwent repairs and modifications to correct issues identified during the shakedown; on 15 July, she also received a new hull number: CVL-24. On 21 July, she departed for the Pacific Ocean, passing through the Panama Canal on 26 July, before meeting her sister ship Princeton, the Essex-class carrier Lexington, and six escorts in Balboa, Panama. The ships then sailed together for Pearl Harbor on 28 July, arriving there on 9 August. The ship's crew spent the following two weeks preparing to join the operation to seize Baker Island.

==== Gilbert and Marshall Islands campaign ====
Belleau Wood was assigned to Task Group (TG) 11.2, which also included Princeton and seven escorts. The ships sortied from Pearl Harbor on 25 August, bound for Baker Island, which they reached on 1 September. That day, fighters from Belleau Wood's combat air patrol (CAP) intercepted and shot down a Japanese Kawanishi H8K flying boat. Over the following two weeks, Belleau Wood and Princeton covered ground forces on the island as they constructed an airfield that would be used to support the impending Gilbert and Marshall Islands campaign. The two light carriers rejoined Lexington in mid-September to carry out strikes on Japanese positions in the Gilbert Islands on 18 and 19 September, as part of the preparatory attacks before the Battle of Tarawa. Her CAP also shot down a Mitsubishi G4M bomber that attempted to attack the fleet. Belleau Wood then returned to Pearl Harbor on 23 September to rearm and refuel, before sailing again to launch a raid on Wake Island on 29 September. For this operation, Belleau Wood was transferred to Task Group 14.5, which included five other carriers. Belleau Wood was primarily occupied with maintaining CAP defense for the fleet, but her air group launched two raids on the island. Two of her Grumman F6F fighters were lost during the raids, one of which was shot down by Japanese anti-aircraft guns, and the other crashed on attempting to land. Four deck crewmen were killed in the accident. The ships then returned to Pearl Harbor on 11 October.

The ship spent the next month training off Pearl Harbor as the fleet readied for the invasion of Tarawa and Makin. Belleau Wood, now part of Task Group 50.2, which included her sister Monterey and the fleet carrier Enterprise, sortied on 10 November. The three carriers struck Makin on 19 November, the day before the invasion of Tarawa began, and they continued to support the fighting on the two islands until 26 November, when the last Japanese resistance was defeated. The following day, Belleau Wood and Enterprise were transferred to Task Group 50.3, which also included Essex. The ships of TG 50.3 and TG 50.1 were sent to raid the Marshall Islands, both to weaken Japanese air power in the area and to reconnoiter Kwajalein Atoll, which was the target of the next major amphibious operation in the campaign. Belleau Wood provided the CAP that defended the task group on 4 December, while the other two carriers struck Kwajalein and Wotje. That evening, in a Japanese counter-attack, a G4M bomber nearly hit Belleau Wood with a torpedo that passed some 10 yd (9.1 m) to starboard. Lexington, of TG 50.1, was hit by a torpedo in the attack, and the two groups covered the damaged carrier as she withdrew to Pearl Harbor for repairs.

The fleet conducted training operations off Pearl Harbor for the next five weeks, and the ships' crews replenished fuel and ammunition for the next major operation, which was codenamed Flintlock: the invasion of the Marshall Islands. The fleet left Pearl Harbor on 16 January 1944; for the operation, Belleau Wood had been transferred to Task Group 58.1, along with Enterprise and the carrier Yorktown. The carriers began raids on Japanese airfields on the Kwajalein, Wotje, and the Maloelap Atolls on 29 January to suppress Japanese air power in the area before the invasion. As before, Belleau Wood was primarily occupied with maintaining the CAP for the rest of the task group, but she did launch one raid on Taroa Airfield on the island of Taroa, one of the constituent islands of Maleolap. During that attack, two of Belleau Wood's fighters were shot down by anti-aircraft fire. The carriers then transitioned to providing direct support to the soldiers and marines fighting in the Battle of Kwajalein, during which another three of Belleau Wood's planes were shot down.

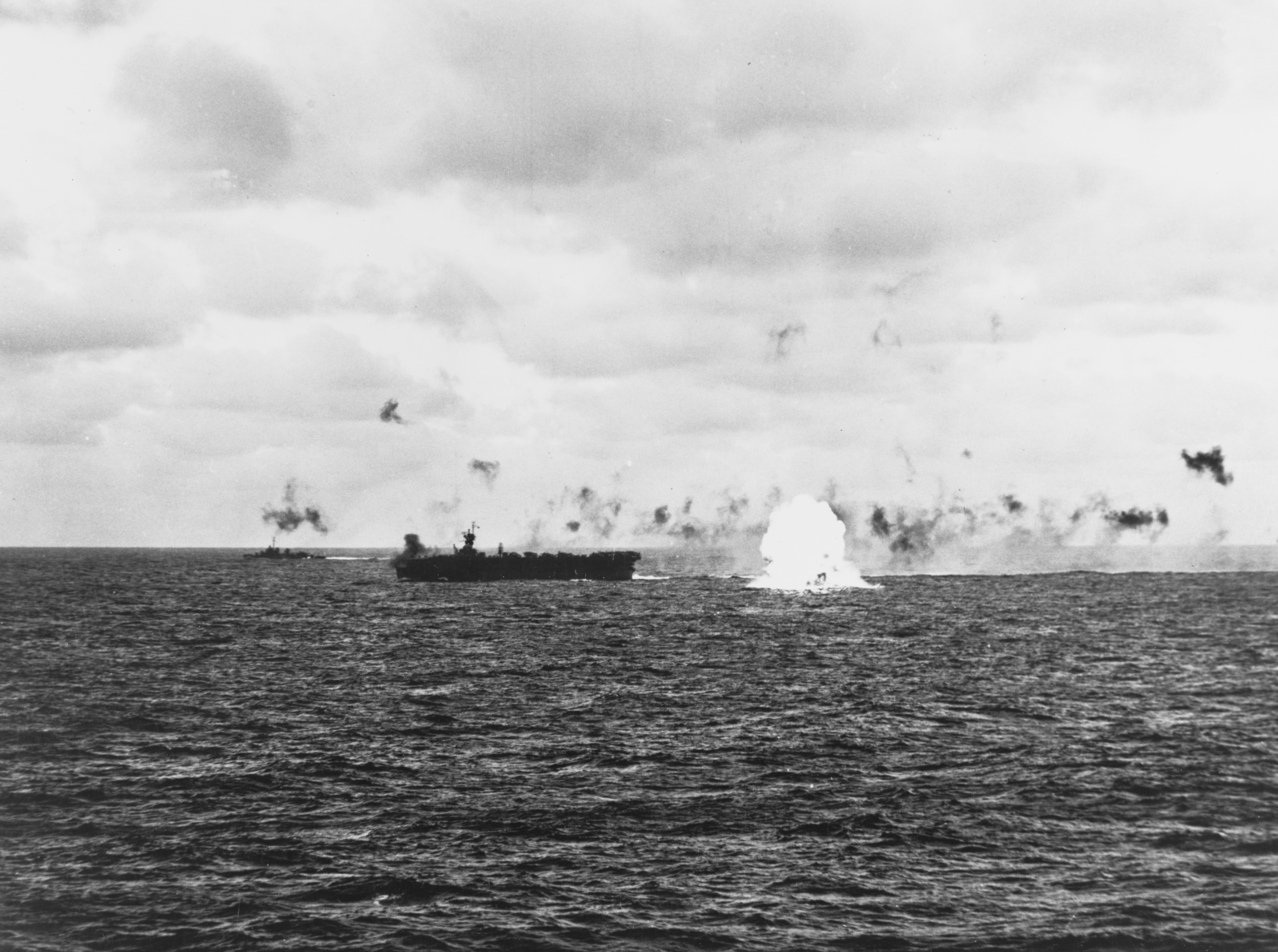
A Japanese bomber explodes as it crashes into the sea near Belleau Wood, during an attack on Task Group 58.2 off the Mariana Islands, 23 February 1944

Belleau Wood and the rest of her task group sailed to Majuro to refuel and replenish munitions and other supplies on 4 February. They then returned to Kwajalein to resume operations against the Japanese defenders. The bulk of the Fast Carrier Task Force, including Belleau Wood, sailed west on 12 February to launch Operation Hailstone, a major attack on the Japanese base in Truk. The raid was intended to cover the next amphibious assault in the campaign, the invasion of Eniwetok. Belleau Wood once again provided air defense for the task group, and on the afternoon of 16 February, one of her fighters shot down a Nakajima B5N torpedo bomber. Following another series of attacks the next day, the task group withdrew to the east to refuel. The carriers sailed back west to attack Japanese positions on Tinian and Saipan in the Mariana Islands; Belleau Wood covered the rest of the carriers as usual. On 22 February, a pair of G4M bombers slipped through the CAP aircraft and attempted to bomb Belleau Wood, but her anti-aircraft battery shot both planes down before they could hit the ship. In the same attack, a Kawasaki Ki-61 fighter attacked Essex, but as it attempted to withdraw, Belleau Wood's guns shot it down as well. Two Kawasaki Ki-48 light bombers were also shot down by Belleau Wood's fighters.

==== Operations in New Guinea ====
The fast carrier task force withdrew back to Majuro on 26 February for another period of replenishment and repairs. Belleau Wood also took on replacement aircraft after her losses in the campaign. Task Group 58.1, which by then included only Belleau Wood and Enterprise and their escorts, sailed on 7 March for Espiritu Santo in the south Pacific, which they reached five days later. There, they joined an amphibious assault force that struck the island of Emirau on 20 March. The landing on Emirau went unopposed, permitting TG 58.1 to sail north to strike airfields in the western Caroline Islands and on New Guinea to suppress Japanese air power in the region as other forces landed in Humboldt Bay and Tanahmerah Bay in the Battle of Hollandia. The carriers then steamed north to hit the Carolines again; Belleau Wood's aircraft targeted Palau on 30 March, and the next day, she launched raids on Yap, Ulithi, and Ngulu. That same day, her fighters shot down two G4M bombers. The ships withdrew on 1 April, and while leaving the area, Belleau Wood sent her fighters to raid Woleai, destroying seven Japanese aircraft on the ground in the process.

The task group then returned to Majuro for another period of maintenance and resupply, which lasted for about a week. The ships sortied again on 13 April to return to operations in support of the ground troops fighting in Hollandia in New Guinea. Belleau Wood once again provided air cover to the rest of the carriers as they struck Japanese positions at Sawar, Wakde, and Sarmi. Belleau Wood refueled at sea on 23 April, then returned to launch raids of her own on Sawar and Sarmi. Task Group 58.1 then got underway for Seeadler Harbor on Manus Island, where they refueled. On 29 April, the fleet carriers raided Truk again, while Belleau Wood provided the CAP defense; the same pattern was repeated the following day against Pohnpei in the Carolines. On 1 May, Belleau Wood's fighters swept the island while American battleships bombarded it. The ships departed for Kwajalein that day, arriving there on 4 May. Over the course of the preceding month's operations, Belleau Wood lost one F6F fighter and two TBF Avenger torpedo bombers.

==== Marianas campaign ====
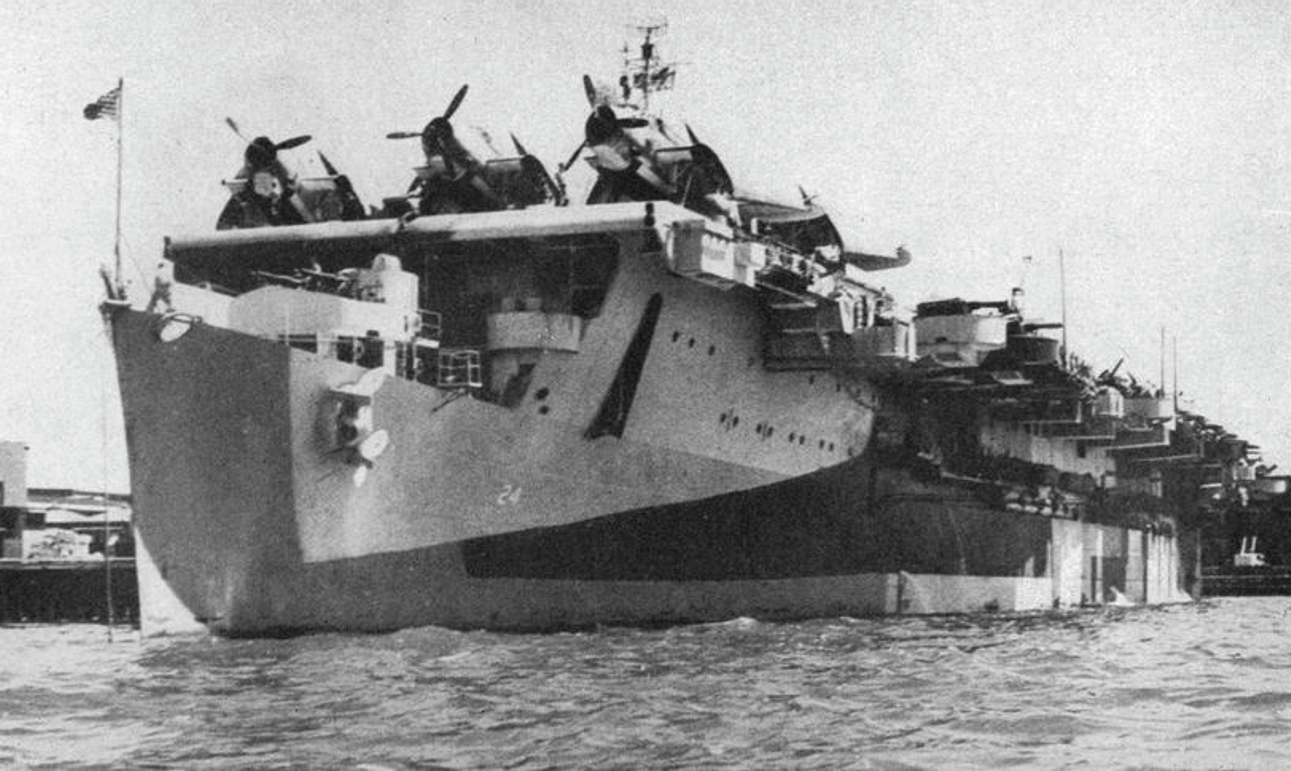
Belleau Wood at Pearl Harbor in July 1944

Belleau Wood and the rest of TG 58.1 then returned to Majuro to rejoin the rest of the fleet as it made preparations for Operation Forager, the invasion of the Mariana Islands in the central Pacific. In the course of the preparations, TG 58.1 was reorganized, and now consisted of Belleau Wood, Yorktown, and the carriers Hornet and Bataan, the latter being a sister to Belleau Wood. The fast carrier task force sortied on 6 June to begin the first phase of the operation, a series of large-scale air attacks on the islands of Saipan, Tinian, and Guam to suppress Japanese air power in the area. The attacks began five days later, and Belleau Wood contributed fighters to a raid on Guam, which shot down four Mitsubishi A6M Zero fighters over Agana, the capital of Guam. The carrier's fighters shot down another Zero and a Kawasaki Ki-45 fighter in a second attack on 12 June, though one of Belleau Wood's F6Fs was also shot down in the engagement. With the initial round of strikes over, the carriers withdrew to refuel on 14 June and then sailed north to strike the Bonin Islands.

The American command hoped that raiding airfields in the Bonins would catch Japanese planes being ferried to reinforce the Marshalls. On 15 June, the American carriers struck Hahajima and Chichijima, though Belleau Wood's fighters once again filled the CAP role. Her bombers attacked and sank a large cargo ship in the area that day. While attempting to land that evening, one of her F6Fs crashed through the barrier and into the island, starting a major fire. Damage-control parties put out the fire after 23 minutes, and no one was injured in the accident, and Belleau Wood resumed flight operations the next day. That morning, the carriers sent a group of fighters to raid Iwo Jima, but reports of a Japanese fleet approaching the American invasion fleet in the Marianas led TG 58.1 to cancel a larger raid on the island planned for that afternoon and steam south at high speed to rendezvous with the rest of the fast carrier task force. The American fleet assembled on 18 June at a position about 150 nmi (280 km; 170 mi) west of Saipan to await the Japanese fleet.

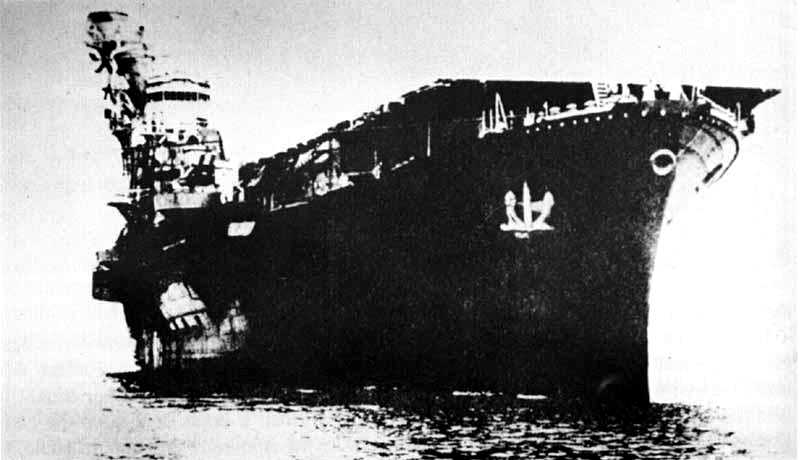
The Japanese carrier Hiyō, which Belleau Wood's TBFs helped to sink

In the ensuing Battle of the Philippine Sea, the Japanese located the American fleet first, allowing them to make the first strike. On the morning of 19 June, Belleau Wood and Bataan launched their CAP fighters to defend the task group, but none of the fourteen Japanese attack groups approached TG 58.1. Those groups were all disrupted by fighters from the other American task groups. Belleau Wood instead sent some of her fighters to sweep Guam again, where they shot down another ten Zero fighters that had been based on the island. The lopsided American victory, which saw some 300 Japanese aircraft destroyed, was dubbed the "Great Marianas Turkey Shoot". That evening, the Japanese carriers began withdrawing to the west, and on the morning of 20 June, the American carriers turned to pursue them. Belleau Wood again sent her CAP fighters aloft that morning, but the fleet's search planes did not locate the retreating Japanese until late in the day. The American carriers nevertheless launched a major strike, and Belleau Wood contributed four TBF torpedo bombers and six F6F fighters to the force. The planes sank the Japanese carrier Hiyō at dusk and then had to make a difficult night landing.

The American fleet continued its pursuit of the retreating Japanese on 21 June, but the latter had too far of a head start, and the Americans soon broke off the chase to return to the invasion beaches. While the fleet steamed to the Marianas, one of Belleau Wood's fighters shot down a G4M bomber. The carriers also reorganized their air groups, as many planes had landed on other carriers in the confused night landing the previous evening. The ships of TG 58.1 detached from the main fleet and steamed north to resume their attacks on the Bonin Islands that had been interrupted by the Battle of the Philippine Sea. Belleau Wood once again provided the task group's fighter defense while the rest of the carriers raided Iwo Jima and inflicted heavy damage on the Japanese aircraft on the island. TG 58.1 then departed for the Marshalls to replenish and refuel, and they arrived in Eniwetok on 27 June. The same day, Belleau Wood left the fleet to return to Pearl Harbor for modifications that included storage for rocket ammunition for her aircraft. She arrived in Hawaii on 2 July, entered the dry dock the next day, and the work was carried out over the following week. She conducted a short training period in Hawaiian waters before departing for the fleet anchorage in the Marshalls on 22 July. She reached Eniwetok on 30 July and joined TG 58.4 on 2 August.

Belleau Wood and the rest of the fast carrier task force were then sent to support the invasion of Guam, and the carrier contributed her aircraft to strikes against Japanese positions on the island during the fighting. She returned to Eniwetok on 13 August to refuel and rearm before the last major phase of the Mariana and Palau campaign. The carriers were ordered to raid Japanese airfields on Yap, Mindanao in the southern Philippines, and the Bonin Islands again, to neutralize any aircraft that might attempt to interfere with the invasion of the Palau Islands and Morotai in New Guinea. Belleau Wood joined Wasp and two other carriers in what was now Task Group 38.1, which sortied on 29 August to begin raids on the Palaus. The following day, one of Belleau Wood's F6F fighters crashed on landing, killing three men, including the assistant air operations commander. On 7 August, the carriers began attacking targets in the Palaus, and several of Belleau Wood's planes struck a phosphate plant on Angaur. The task group continued westward to make their attack on Mindanao. While the carriers steamed off the island, Belleau Wood's fighters shot down a Yokosuka P1Y bomber and a Kawasaki Ki-45 fighter, though one of her F6Fs was shot down as well.

Belleau Wood's fighters carried out sweeps over the airfields at Buayan and Digos on 10 September, while her TBF Avengers raided the field at Cotabato, though they found few Japanese aircraft to destroy. The task group then turned north to raid the Visayas in the central Philippines, where the ship's fighters raided Negros and Cebu, claiming a pair of Zeros, a Nakajima Ki-43 fighter, and a Nakajima B6N torpedo bomber on 12 September. Belleau Wood's aircraft also launched a series of rocket attacks on Japanese installations and coastal shipping in the area. The next day, her fighters destroyed another Ki-43 and a P1Y. TG 38.1 then sailed south to provide cover for the landings on Morotai, where Belleau Wood's fighters destroyed five G4M bombers and a Ki-45 fighter on the ground. The landing was carried out between 15 and 17 September, but the carriers saw no further significant combat during that period, and on the 18th, Belleau Wood was transferred to TG 38.4; she departed for Seeadler Harbor to refuel and rearm before joining her new unit, which included Enterprise, the fleet carrier Franklin, and the light carrier San Jacinto. The group left Seeadler Harbor on 24 September to patrol off Palau, remaining there until 5 October because of a typhoon in the area, before rejoining the rest of the fast carrier task force west of the Marianas.

==== Philippines campaign ====
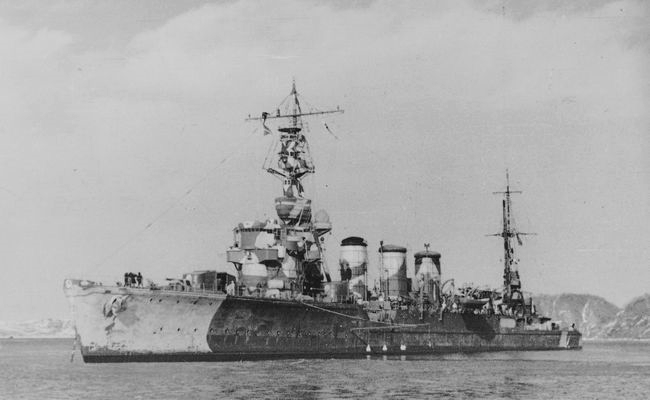
The Japanese cruiser Tama, which Belleau Wood's TBFs sank at the Battle off Cape Engaño

The American fleet then began operations to prepare for its next major amphibious assault in the central Pacific: the invasion of the Philippines. After refueling at sea on 7 October, the fast carrier task force got underway to begin a series of raids on nearby targets that would try to interfere with the coming invasion, beginning with the Ryukyu Islands. Three days later, the carriers raided airfields on Okinawa and two other islands in the group, destroying dozens of Japanese aircraft and many coastal ships. The carriers then turned south, struck airfields on Luzon in the northern Philippines, before turning west to raid the island of Formosa. In the course of the so-called Formosa Air Battle, which lasted from 12 to 16 October, Belleau Wood carried out a series of raids against Japanese infrastructure on the island, claiming to have destroyed five aircraft in strikes on airfields. Her fighters on CAP also shot down three Zeros, a Ki-43 fighter, and five G4M bombers that attempted to hit the carriers on 13 October. Later that day, another six G4Ms slipped through the CAP aircraft, but Belleau Wood's anti-aircraft guns assisted with the destruction of four of the bombers.

The ships of TG 38.4 turned south on 14 October to begin preparatory attacks on Leyte, which was the target of the impending amphibious assault. The carrier planes raided airfields at Aparri on the island of Luzon first, and then struck targets around Manila Bay as they made their way south to Leyte. In the course of these raids, Belleau Wood's fighters claimed another eleven Japanese aircraft of various types. They also claimed a pair of cargo ships and an oil tanker. The Battle of Leyte began on 20 October, and over the following three days, Belleau Wood provided CAP over the invasion beach.

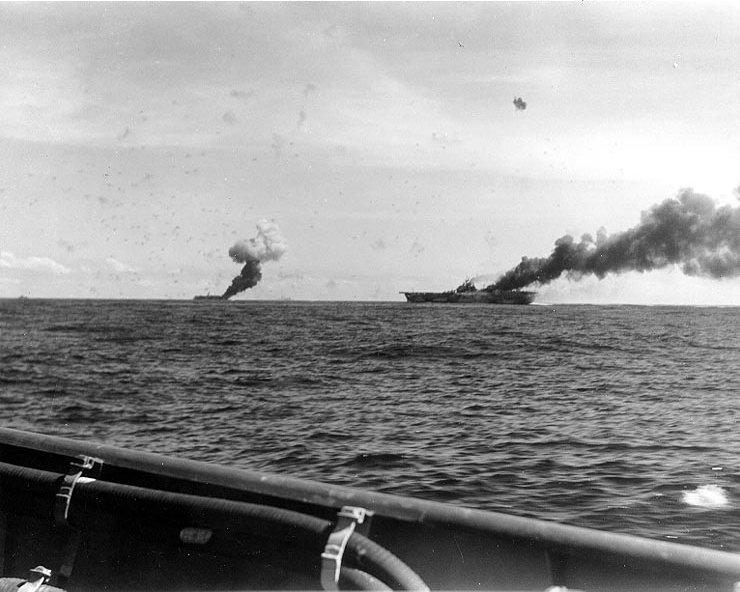
Belleau Wood (left, distance) and Franklin (right) burning after being struck by kamikazes off Leyte on 30 October

In response to the American invasion of the Philippines, the Japanese sent four major fleet units to attack the invasion fleet in a synchronized action. The ensuing action, the Battle of Leyte Gulf, consisted of a series of separate battles between American and Japanese forces. TG 38.4 launched search planes on the morning of 24 October to try to locate the Japanese fleet in the Visaya islands; after locating the Japanese Center Force, Belleau Wood and the other carriers launched a major attack on it, which resulted in the Battle of the Sibuyan Sea. In that action, Belleau Wood's TBFs claimed to have made torpedo hits on one of the Japanese battleships. Later that evening, Halsey received reports of the aircraft carriers of the Northern Force, and the fast carrier task force steamed north to intercept them. The following morning, all four Japanese carriers were sunk in the Battle off Cape Engaño, though Belleau Wood did not contribute any aircraft to their destruction. Her TBFs did assist with the sinking of the light cruiser Tama, however. A separate action fought between surface forces—the Battle of Surigao Strait—saw the destruction of the Southern Force on the night of 24–25 October. Center Force, not dissuaded from its attacks the previous day, pressed on and nearly broke through to the invasion fleet in the Battle off Samar, but was eventually driven off by the escort carriers, destroyers, and destroyer escorts providing local defense to the fleet.

The ships of TG 38.4 refueled on 26 October and then returned to direct support of the soldiers fighting on Leyte for the next four days. The carriers also struck airfields around Manila to interdict reinforcements being sent to the Philippines. The Japanese began the first kamikaze suicide attacks in response to the worsening strategic situation; the first struck the carrier Intrepid on 29 October, and another attack was carried out the next day. At around 14:00, five kamikazes slipped past the CAP defense by flying at an altitude of around 18,000 ft (5,500 m). Three of the planes were shot down by the fleet's antiaircraft fire, but one crashed into Franklin; the last plane, identified as a Zero fighter, dropped a bomb on Franklin before diving on Belleau Wood at 14:27 and slamming into her flight deck. The Zero landed in the middle of eleven loaded F6F fighters and started a series of explosions and serious fires. The damage control teams worked for three hours to suppress the blaze. The attack killed 92 and wounded another 97, and damaged the flight deck, which prevented further air operations. The ship detached from the fleet and sailed east to the Caroline Islands.

While stopped at Ulithi from 3 to 10 November, the ship's crew made some temporary repairs, before she departed for San Francisco for permanent repairs. She passed through Pearl Harbor on the way, finally arriving on the West Coast on 29 November. There, she was dry docked at the Hunters Point Naval Shipyard the following day. Along with repair work, the ship was overhauled and additional 40 mm Bofors guns were installed. The work was completed by mid-January 1945, and she thereafter got underway to rejoin the fleet. She reached Ulithi on 7 February, where she joined TG 58.1, which included Hornet, Wasp, and the fleet carrier Bennington.

==== Volcano and Ryukyu Islands campaign ====
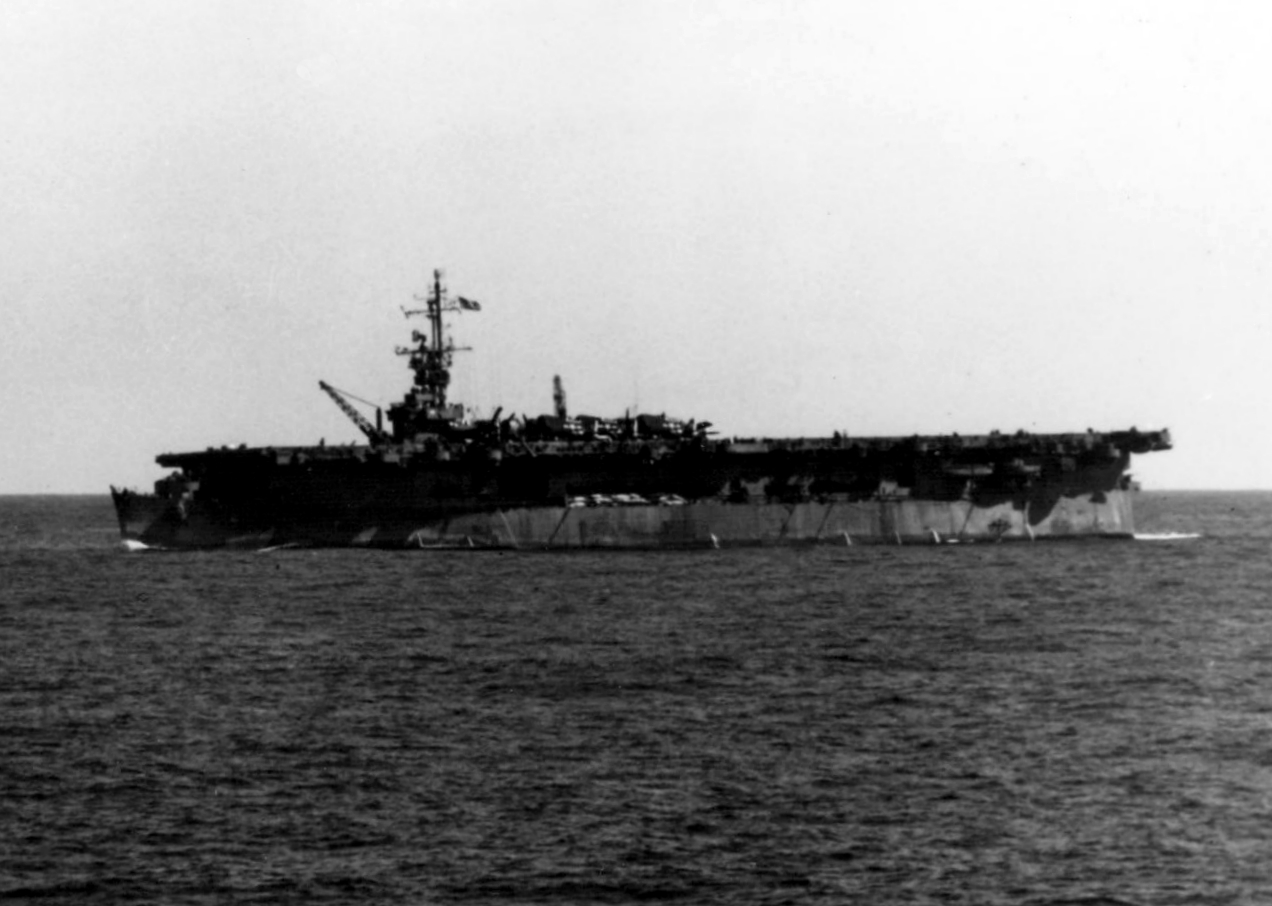
Belleau Wood off Iwo Jima in February 1945

On 10 February, the ships of TG 58.1 sortied to carry out a series of strikes against Japanese positions in the Japanese Home Islands to disrupt forces that would interfere with the planned invasions of the Bonin and Ryukyu Islands in the Volcano and Ryukyu Islands campaign, which was to prepare the way for the eventual invasion of Japan. By 16 February, TG 58.1 had reached a position about 125 nmi (232 km; 144 mi) southeast of Tokyo, and they began their attacks on airfields in Japan. The American carrier planes claimed several hundred Japanese aircraft destroyed in these raids. That morning, one of Belleau Wood's fighters on CAP shot down a Mitsubishi Ki-46 reconnaissance plane that approached the fleet. Poor weather forced the remaining planned attacks to be canceled, and the fast carrier task force instead sailed south to provide cover for the invasion of Iwo Jima on 19 February.

Belleau Wood provided air defense over Iwo Jima for the following five days to prevent Japanese aircraft from supporting the garrison as US marines fought for control of the island. Her aircraft also raided the airfield at Susaki on Chichi Jima to reduce Japanese counterattacks on the invasion force. The Japanese were mounting increasingly severe kamikaze attacks on the fleet, so the fast carrier task force sailed north to launch another major raid on the Tokyo area. They were again blocked by bad weather on 25 February, and they instead diverted to raid Okinawa. Belleau Wood's fighters once again provided CAP defense, and her TBFs were used to carry out rocket attacks on Japanese installations on Okinawa on 1 March. The fleet then sailed south to replenish stores and ammunition at Ulithi to prepare for the next phase of the campaign.

The ships lay at Ulithi for ten days, until 14 March, when they sortied to begin preparatory attacks for the last major invasion of the war: the invasion of Okinawa. TG 58.1 was ordered to attack Japanese airfields on Kyushu, the southern-most of the Home Islands, to reduce the considerable air power assembled for the final defense of Japan. Four days later, the ships were in position and launched a large-scale raid on the island, along with secondary raids on the naval bases at Kure and Kobe. Belleau Wood's fighters again served in the CAP for the following three days and saw extensive combat. On 21 March alone, her aircraft and eight fighters from Hornet claimed the destruction of twenty-one Japanese planes between them. The carriers then turned their attention to Okinawa itself from 23 to 28 March, and Belleau Wood's fighters conducted sweeps over the Ryukyus to catch any Japanese aircraft that may be in the area. On 29 March, she contributed her aircraft to a major raid on Kyushu airfields in concert with Boeing B-29 Superfortress bombers flying from the Mariana Islands. She thereafter resumed strikes on Okinawa.

American forces went ashore on Okinawa on 1 April, and Belleau Wood provided air defense over the invasion fleet. She also provided close air support to the marines fighting their way across the island. On 6 April, a Zero fighter attempted to crash into the ship, but her antiaircraft guns shot it down before it could collide with the ship. The shock wave from the underwater explosion of the sinking Zero threw one man overboard, who was not recovered. The next day, the ship took part in the destruction of the battleship Yamato, which had been sent on a final suicide mission to attack the invasion fleet. Aircraft from Belleau Wood claimed hits on several of the destroyers escorting Yamato; carrier aircraft from the American fleet sank most of the Japanese ships, including Yamato.

Belleau Wood resumed air operations over Okinawa, both to defend the fleet and ground forces from Japanese air attack, and to degrade Japanese airfields on nearby islands. Over the course of the following three weeks, the ship's fighters destroyed fourteen Japanese aircraft. She thereafter withdrew to Ulithi to refuel and rearm. She arrived there on 30 April, but arrived back on station off Okinawa by 12 May. There, she replaced the carrier Bunker Hill in TG 58.3, which had been badly damaged by a kamikaze. The unit at that time also included Essex, the fleet carrier Hancock, and the light carrier Cabot. Belleau Wood resumed her previous activities, her fighters patrolling over Okinawa and attacking Japanese airfields in the region. During this period, her fighters shot down a Nakajima Ki-84 fighter and a G4M bomber, though one of her TBFs was shot down by antiaircraft fire. By early June, the onset of typhoon season forced the carriers to halt flight operations, though Belleau Wood was able to launch one raid on 7 June. On 10 June, the fast carrier task force withdrew to the Philippines to avoid the severe weather.

==== Japan campaign and the end of the war ====
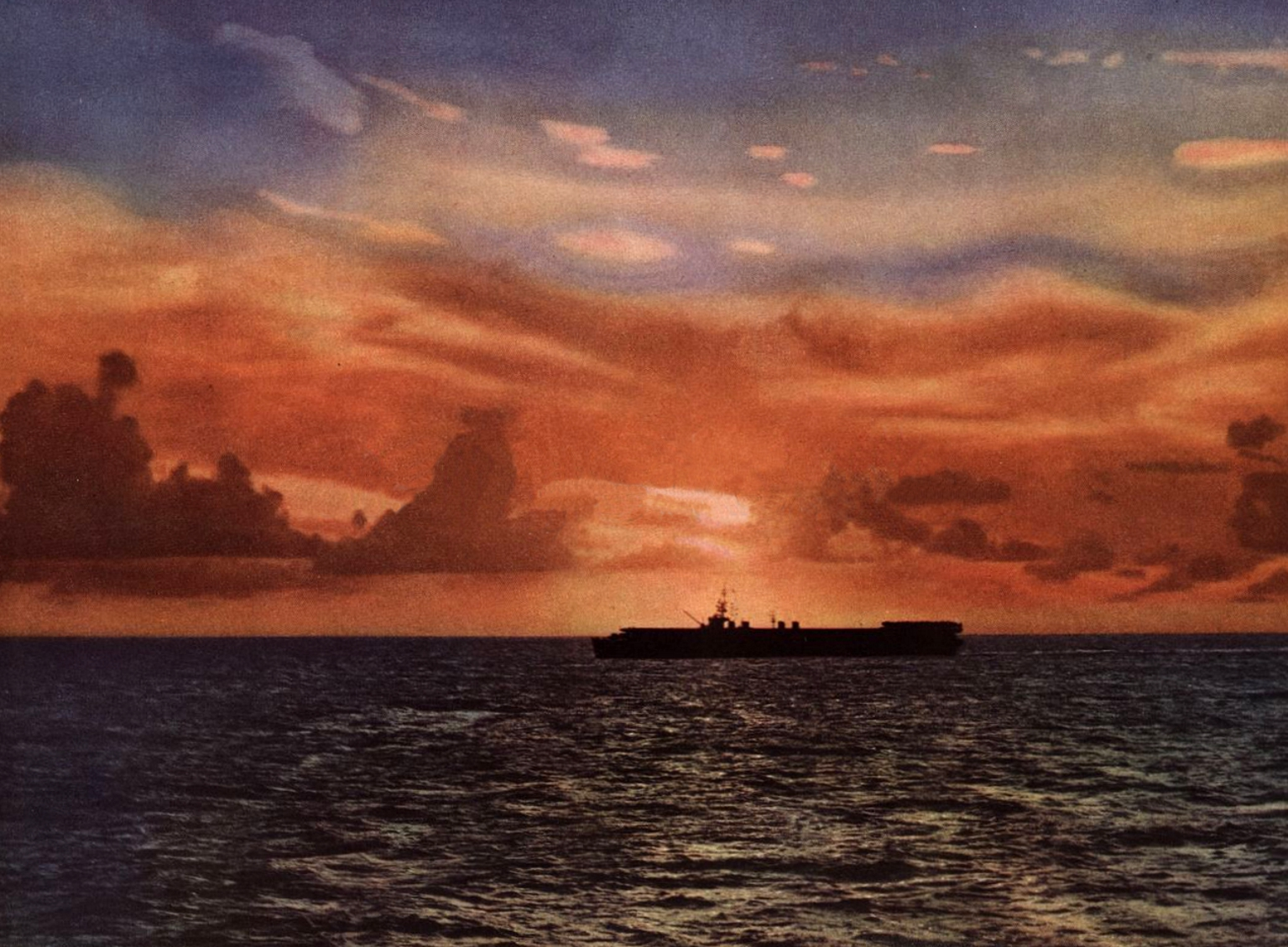
Belleau Wood at sea in 1945

The carriers spent the next two weeks in the Philippines training and making repairs, before departing on 1 July to return to operations off Japan. Belleau Wood's aircraft participated in a strike on airfields near Tokyo on 10 July, followed by attacks on various targets on Hokkaido on 14 and 15 July. The carriers returned to attacking the Tokyo area two days later before breaking off to refuel at sea from 19 to 23 July. Belleau Wood's aircraft next raided the naval base at Kur on 24 July, where they assisted in the sinking of the hybrid battleship-carrier Hyūga and another fifteen smaller vessels. On 25 July, Belleau Wood's fighters were attacked by a group of Japanese fighters while over Yōkaichi, and in the ensuing battle, the Americans claimed to have shot down five Ki-84s and two Ki-61s, and lost two fighters to the Japanese. Further attacks were cancelled due to bad weather for most of the rest of the month, until 29 July, when Belleau Wood and the other carriers launched another series of raids then and on 30 July. The ships then withdrew to refuel again, and coupled with another typhoon, the carriers were not back on station again to resume air attacks until 9 August. Belleau Wood's aircraft struck airfields on the northern end of Honshu, which disrupted a Japanese strike on the Marianas using long-range bombers. Operations around Tokyo resumed on 13 August, and two days later, a patrol of four F6Fs from Belleau Wood engaged a group of Japanese fighters that had attempted to intercept a strike of TBFs operated by the British Pacific Fleet. In that action, the American fighters shot down five Zeroes and a Ki-43 fighter; this was to be the ship's last action of the war. Shortly thereafter, the Japanese indicated they would surrender, leading to a cessation of all combat missions.

Belleau Wood cruised for the next week in Japanese waters, waiting on instructions for the final Japanese surrender. From 22 August to 10 September, the ship's aircraft patrolled over Japan, searching for downed aircrew and dropping supplies to prisoner of war camps. Over the course of her career during the war, the ship received twelve battle stars. On 10 September, she entered Tokyo Bay for maintenance, before departing on the 15th for Eniwetok to take on a load of supplies to bring back to Japan. She arrived off Japan on 7 October, and proceeded to Tokyo Bay, which she reached five days later. After embarking several hundred men, she departed again on 20 October, this time bound for Pearl Harbor, arriving there eight days later. Belleau Wood was then assigned to Operation Magic Carpet, the repatriation of thousands of American servicemen after the end of the war. Her crew installed some 600 additional bunks in the hangar to accommodate additional passengers. On her first mission, she took on 1,248 men from the Army and Navy, departing on 1 November and arriving in San Francisco five days later. She made two further Magic Carpet trips, the first to Guam from 11 November to 10 December and carrying 2,053 men home, and the second from 18 December to 31 January 1946, also to Guam. The ship was thereafter placed in reserve at San Francisco. She underwent modifications through 1946 and into 1947 and was eventually decommissioned on 13 January 1947 and placed at the Alameda Naval Air Station.

=== French Navy ===
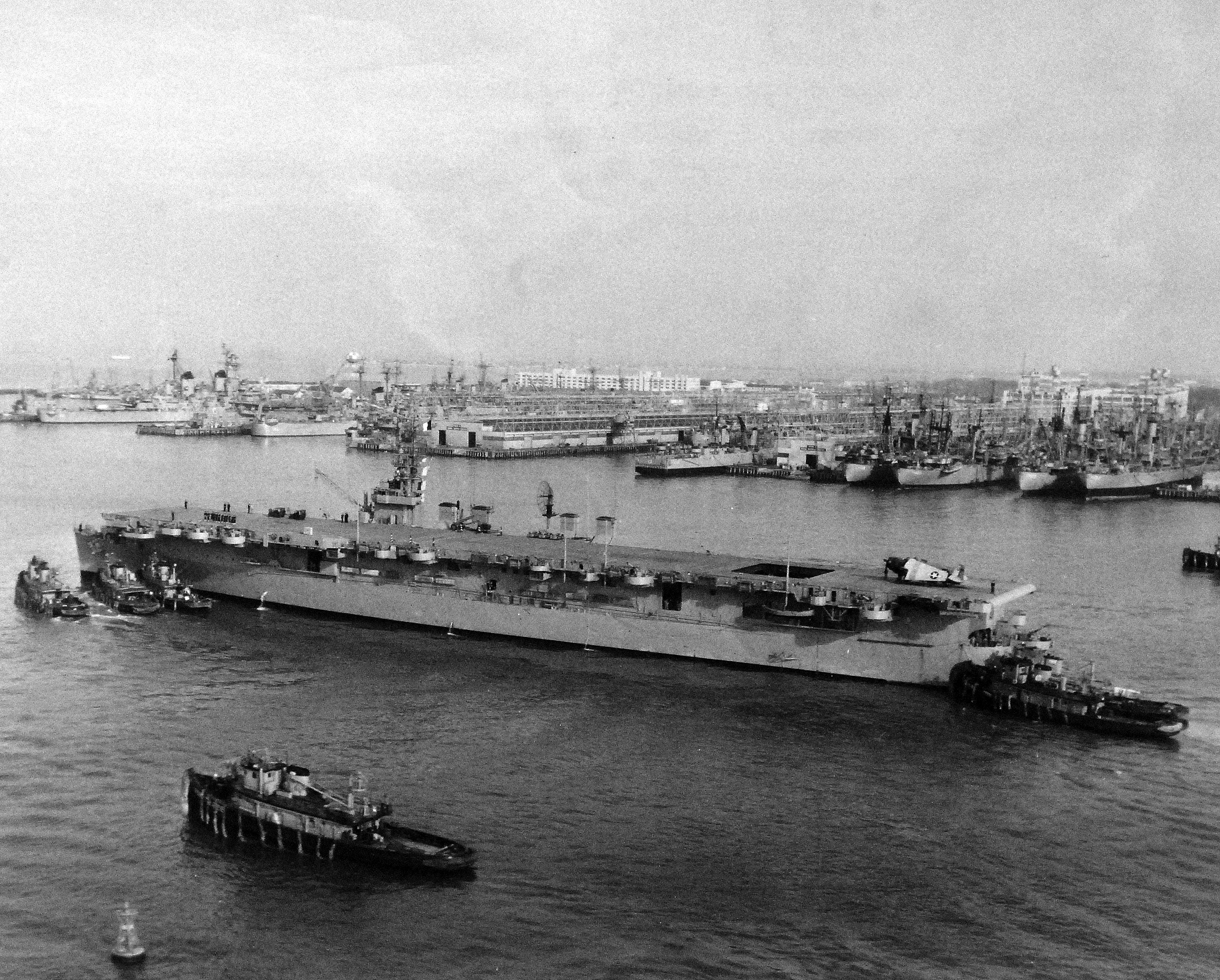
Bois Belleau in French service in 1953

The ship remained laid up until 5 September 1953, when she was transferred to the French Navy as aid according to the Mutual Defense Assistance Act. During this period, she was renamed Bois Belleau. The French, then at the height of the First Indochina War, was in need of additional aircraft carriers to support the two light carriers—La Fayette (formerly USS Langley), and Arromanches (formerly HMS Colossus)—then operating off French Indochina. The loan of Belleau Wood was ordered by President Dwight D. Eisenhower. The French Navy initially had trouble putting together a crew to man the ship, which delayed her delivery to France until December. In addition, her boilers were found to be in poor condition upon her reactivation, which required repairs once she arrived in France.

Bois Belleau arrived in southeast Asian waters on 30 April 1954, during the final stages of the Indochina War. The Battle of Dien Bien Phu had reached a critical stage by that point, and the French garrison soon surrendered on 7 May. The French carriers operated in the Gulf of Tonkin during the Indochina War, and their aircraft were hampered by the long flight time to Dien Bien Phu in western Indochina. Bois Belleau served in the area until November 1955. For the rest of the 1950s, Bois Belleau, La Fayette, and Arromanches formed the core of the French carrier fleet until the French-built carriers of the Clemenceau class were completed in the early 1960s.

In June 1957, Bois Belleau joined a contingent of six ships to participate in an international naval review held in Hampton Roads, Virginia, in the United States. The French squadron, led by the anti-aircraft cruiser De Grasse, was the largest foreign delegation to the review. The squadron also included the destroyers Chevalier Paul and Dupetit-Thouars and the frigates Le Gascon and Le Lorrain.

The French Navy returned the ship to the United States in early September 1960 at the Philadelphia Naval Shipyard. She was struck from the Naval Vessel Register on 1 October, and was sold to ship breakers for scrap on 21 November.

== Media links ==
- Departute of the Bois Belleau from Toulon (newsreels video)
- Arrival in the French Indochina of the Bois Belleau (newsreels video)
