= Marshall Islands International Airport =

Airport in Marshall Islands

Amata Kabua International Airport Marshall Islands International Airport
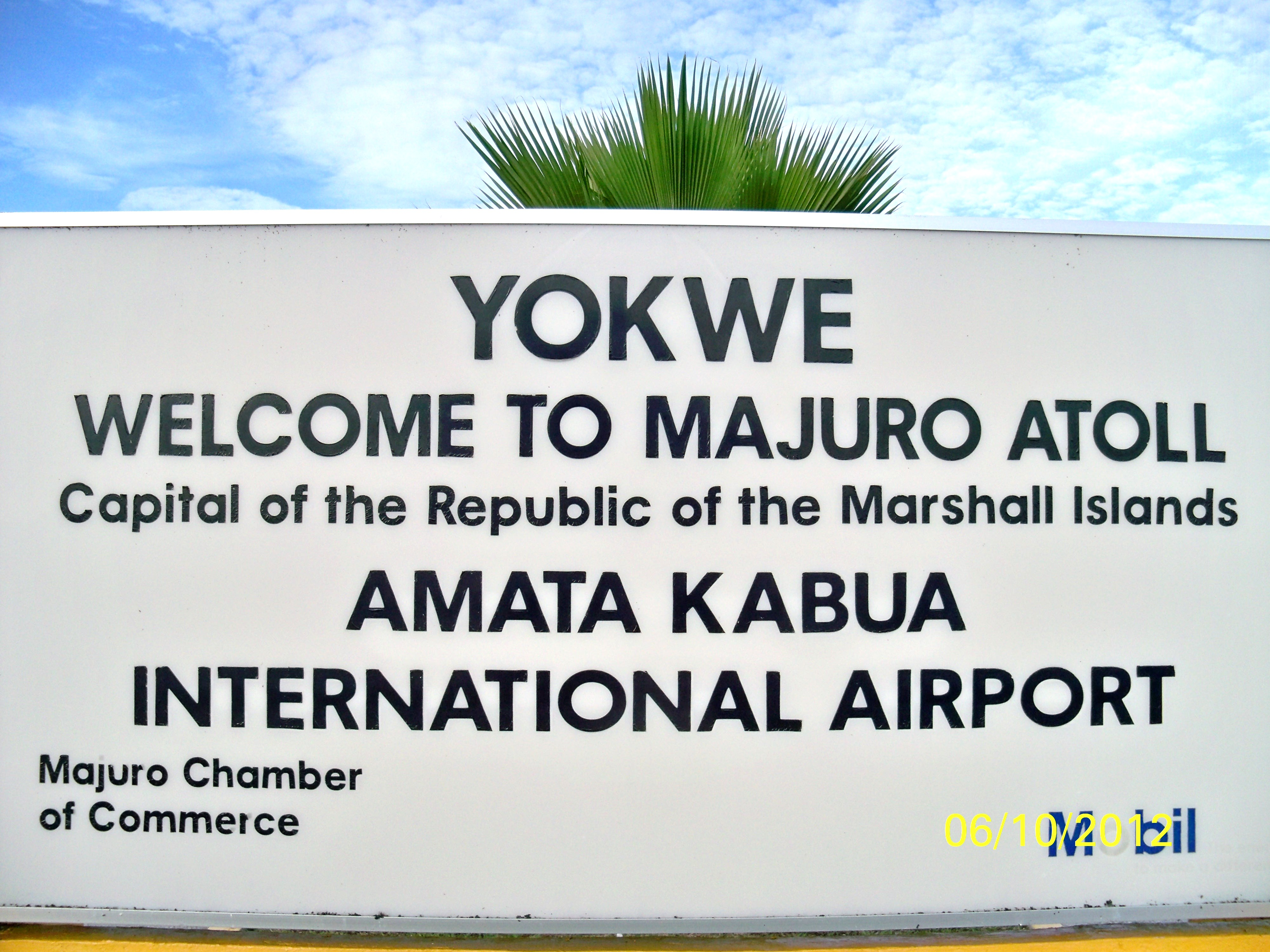
- Welcome
- IATA: MAJ; ICAO: PKMJ; FAA LID: MAJ

Summary
- Airport type: Public
- Operator: RMI Ports Authority
- Serves: Majuro
- Location: Majuro
- Hub for: Air Marshall Islands
- Elevation AMSL: 6 ft / 2 m
- Coordinates: 07°03′53″N 171°16′19″E

Map
- location of the Airport in Majuro, Marshall Islands MAJ (Oceania) MAJ (Pacific Ocean)

Runways
Direction	Length		Surface
Direction	m	ft	Surface
07/25	2,407	7,897	Asphalt

Marshall Islands International Airport (IATA: MAJ, ICAO: PKMJ, FAA LID: MAJ), also known as Amata Kabua International Airport, is located in the western part of Rairok on the south side of Majuro Atoll, the capital of the Republic of the Marshall Islands. The airport was built during World War II (1943) on Anenelibw and Lokojbar islets. It replaced Majuro Airfield, a coral-surfaced airstrip at Delap Island near the eastern end of Majuro Atoll that had been originally constructed by Japanese occupation forces in 1942.

A series of single-floor structures (small hangars) make up the airport terminal. No physical structures existed at the airport prior to the 1970s. The current terminal structure and modern runway/apron were built in 1971. Passengers from flights arriving at the airport use stairs to exit aircraft and walk to the terminal.

The airport is capable of handling all propeller-driven aircraft as well as midsize jet aircraft (e.g., Airbus A320s, Boeing 737s, Boeing 757s and Boeing 767s).

The Republic of the Marshall Islands Ports Authority replaced the Marshall Islands Airports Authority in managing the airport in 2003 under RMI Port Authority Act.

== Airport improvements ==
Sea walls have been added to prevent the sea from reclaiming the infill used to create the airport.

Between 2007 and 2009, airport improvement projects replaced the runway surfaces, rebuilt the apron to better handle aircraft, and repaved and added markings to the runway. In 2007 the US FAA added two new airport crash tenders to the existing three-tender fleet, as part of the airport improvement projects.

== Airlines and destinations ==
Airlines	Destinations
Air Marshall Islands	Ailuk, Airok, Aur, Bikini, Ebon, Elenak, Enejit, Enewetak, Jaluit, Jeh, Kaben, Kili, Kwajalein, Lae, Majkin, Maloelap, Mejit, Mili, Namdrik, Rongelap, Ujae, Utirik, Wotho, Wotje
Nauru Airlines	Brisbane, Koror, Nauru, Pohnpei, Tarawa
United Airlines	Chuuk, Guam, Honolulu, Kosrae, Kwajalein, Pohnpei

== Ground transportation ==
Taxis and shuttle buses provide ground transportation to and from the airport to other areas of the island. The main and only road on Majuro Island provides access to the airport.

== See also ==
- Island Hopper scheduled air service
