= Jeh =

Jeh or JEH may refer to:

- Jeh (Zoroastrianism), best known as Jahi, the demoness of lust
- Jeh Island, in the Ailinglaplap Atoll of the Marshall Islands in the South Pacific
- Jeh Airport, on the island
- Jeh language, spoken in Laos and Vietnam
- Tata Jeh, better known as Nano, an automobile
- The Journal of Economic History, an academic journal

== People ==
- Jeh (footballer), full name Jeferson Marinho dos Santos, Brazilian footballer
- Jackie Earle Haley (born 1961) American actor
- J. Edgar Hoover (1895–1972) American law enforcement administrator, first director of the Federal Bureau of Investigation (FBI) of the United States
- Jeh Johnson (born 1957) American trial lawyer and secretary of the United States Department of Homeland Security
- Jeh V. Johnson (1931–2021) American architect and educator
