= Wotho Airport =

- IATA: WTO; ICAO: none

Summary
- Airport type: Public
- Serves: Wotho, Wotho Atoll, Marshall Islands
- Coordinates: 10°10′24″N 166°00′10″E
- Interactive map of Wotho Airport

Runways
Direction	Length		Surface
Direction	ft	m	Surface
	2,850	868	Turf
- Source: Great Circle Mapper

Wotho Airport is a public use airstrip at Wotho on Wotho Atoll, Marshall Islands.

== Airlines and destinations ==
Air Marshall Islands connects Wotho Airport to Bucholz Army Airfield (Kwajalein), Lae Airport, Marshall Islands International Airport (Majuro), and Ujae Airport.
