= Ujae Airport =

- IATA: UJE; ICAO: none

Summary
- Airport type: Public
- Serves: Ujae, Ujae Atoll, Marshall Islands
- Coordinates: 08°55′41″N 165°45′45″E
- Interactive map of Ujae Airport

Runways
Direction	Length		Surface
Direction	ft	m	Surface
	2,500	762	Turf
- Source: Great Circle Mapper

Ujae Airport is a public use airstrip at Ujae on Ujae Atoll, Marshall Islands.

== Airlines and destinations ==
Air Marshall Islands connects Ujae Airport to Bucholz Army Airfield (Kwajalein), Lae Airport, and Marshall Islands International Airport (Majuro).
