= MJE =

MJE may refer to:

- Majkin Airport, Marshall Islands (IATA code MJE)
- Muskum language, spoken in Chad (ISO 639 code mje)
