= Likiep Airport =

Airport in Marshall Islands

- IATA: LIK; ICAO: none

Summary
- Airport type: Public
- Serves: Likiep, Likiep Atoll, Marshall Islands
- Coordinates: 09°49′24″N 169°18′31″E
- Interactive map of Likiep Airport

Runways
Direction	Length		Surface
Direction	ft	m	Surface
	2,800	854	Turf
- Source: Great Circle Mapper

Likiep Airport is a public use airport at Likiep on Likiep Atoll, Marshall Islands.

== Airlines and destinations ==
Air Marshall Islands connects Likiep Airport to Bucholz Army Airfield (Kwajalein) and Wotje Airport.
