= Kili Airport =

Airport in Marshall Islands

- IATA: KIO; ICAO: none; FAA LID: Q51

Summary
- Serves: Kili Island, Marshall Islands
- Elevation AMSL: 5 ft (1.5 m)
- Coordinates: 05°38′46.2″N 169°07′42″E
- Interactive map of Kili Airport

Runways
Direction	Length		Surface
Direction	ft	m	Surface
04/22	4,400	1,341	Coral gravel
- Source: Federal Aviation Administration

Kili Airport is a public use airstrip on Kili Island, Marshall Islands. This airstrip is assigned the location identifier Q51 by the FAA and KIO by the IATA.

== Facilities ==
Kili Airport is at an elevation of 5 feet (2.5 m) above mean sea level. The runway is designated 04/22 with a coral gravel surface measuring 4,400 by 100 feet (1,341 x 30 m). There are no aircraft based at Kili.

== Airlines and destinations ==
Air Marshall Islands connects Kili Airport to Marshall Islands International Airport (Majuro) and Namorik Airport (Namdrik).
