= AUL =

AUL may refer to:

- Americans United for Life, an American anti-abortion organization
- Arctic Umiaq Line, a passenger and cargo coastal ferry in Greenland
- Arts, Sciences and Technology University in Lebanon
- Athletic Union League (Dublin), association football league in the Republic of Ireland
- Cork Athletic Union League, association football league in the Republic of Ireland
- Aur Airport, airstrip assigned the location identifier AUL by IATA
- Australia, UNDP country code
