= Elenak Airport =

Airport in Marshall Islands

- IATA: EAL; ICAO: none

Summary
- Airport type: Public
- Serves: Elenak, Kwajalein Atoll, Marshall Islands
- Coordinates: 9°19′14″N 166°50′44″E
- Interactive map of Elenak Airport

Elenak Airport is a public-use airport at Elenak on Kwajalein Atoll, Marshall Islands. This airport is on the northwest side of Kwakalein atoll, on the island of Mejato. The airport is just east of the island of Ebadon.

== Airlines and destinations ==
Air Marshall Islands connects Elenak Airport to Bikini Atoll Airport, Bucholz Army Airfield (Kwajalein), Marshall Islands International Airport (Majuro), and Rongelap Airport.
