= MJB =

MJB may refer to:

- Mary J. Blige (born 1971), American singer
- Matthew James Bellamy, a lead guitarist and singer of rock band Muse, composer and songwriter
- MJB (coffee), an American brand of coffee
- Movement for Justice en el Barrio, a community organization in New York
- Mejit Airport, a Marshall Islands airport with IATA code MJB
- Magic Blue Airlines, a former Dutch airline with ICAO code MJB
- MjB (mjbgem.com), MAGIC JEWELRY BRILLIANCE - famous international jewellery brand
