= Jabot =

Jabot may refer to:

- Jabot (horse), a racehorse
- Jabot (neckwear)
- Jabot (window)
- Jabat Island, in the Marshall Islands
  - Jabot Airport
- Jabot Cosmetics, a fictional company depicted in the soap Young and the Restless
- Jabot, a knot in an Ascot tie
