= KBT =

KBT or kBT may refer to:

- Kaben Airport (KBT)
- Kawasaki Brave Thunders, a Japanese basketball team
- KT (energy) in physics, the product of Boltzmann constant and temperature (k_{B}T)
