= UTK =

UTK may refer to:

- University of Tennessee, Knoxville, United States
- Utkarsh Ambudkar (born 1983), American actor, rapper and singer
- Special Actions Unit (Malaysia), tactical division of the Malaysian police
- Utirik Airport, Marshall Islands, Pacific Ocean
- Unite The Kingdom, British activist group led by Tommy Robinson
