= Ebon Airport =

Airport on Ebon Atoll, Marshall Islands

- IATA: EBO; ICAO: none

Summary
- Serves: Ebon, Ebon Atoll, Marshall Islands
- Coordinates: 04°35′56″N 168°45′11″E
- Interactive map of Ebon Airport

Runways
Direction	Length		Surface
Direction	ft	m	Surface
	2,650	808
- Source: Great Circle Mapper

Ebon Airport is a public use airstrip at Ebon on Ebon Atoll, Marshall Islands. This airstrip is assigned the location identifier EBO by the IATA.

== Facilities ==
Ebon Airport has one runway measuring 2,650 ft (808 m).

== Airlines and destinations ==
Air Marshall Islands connects Ebon Airport to Enejit Airport and Marshall Islands International Airport (Majuro).
