= Attongtonganebwokwbwokw =

Island in the Marshall Islands

Coordinates: 06°13′00″N 172°02′00″E

Attongtonganebwokwbwokw (also known as Yattokoton or Yattokoton-To; Marshallese: Āton̄ton̄-eņ-ebokbok, [ædˠɔŋʷ(ɔ)dˠɔŋwɛːnˠɛːbˠɔɡʷ(ɔ)bˠɔkʷ]) is an island of the Marshall Islands.

== See also ==
- Mili Atoll
