= Jabot Airport =

Airport in Marshall Islands

- IATA: JAT; ICAO: none

Summary
- Airport type: Public
- Serves: Jabot, Marshall Islands
- Coordinates: 07°45′00″N 168°58′40.08″E
- Interactive map of Jabot Airport
- Source: Great Circle Mapper

Jabot Airport, also known as Jabat Airport, is a public-use airport on Jabot Island, Marshall Islands. This airport is assigned the location identifier JAT by the IATA.

== Airlines and destinations ==
Air Marshall Islands connects Jabot Airport to Jeh Airport and Woja Airport.
