= Mili Airport =

- IATA: MIJ; ICAO: none; FAA LID: 1Q9

Summary
- Serves: Mili, Mili Atoll
- Elevation AMSL: 4 ft (1.2 m)
- Coordinates: 06°05′06″N 171°43′53″E
- Interactive map of Mili Airport

Runways
| Direction | Length | | Surface |
| Direction | ft | m | Surface |
|---|---|---|---|
| 05/23 | 2,850 | 869 | Turf |
- Source: Federal Aviation Administration

Mili Airport is a public use airstrip in the village of Mili on Mili Atoll, Marshall Islands. This airstrip is assigned the location identifier 1Q9 by the FAA and MIJ by the IATA.

== Facilities ==
Mili Airport is at an elevation of 4 feet (1.2 m) above mean sea level. The runway is designated 05/23 with a turf surface measuring 2,850 by 75 feet (869 x 23 m). There are no aircraft based at Mili.

== Airlines and destinations ==
Air Marshall Islands connects Mili Airport to Marshall Islands International Airport (Majuro).
