= Woja Airport =

- IATA: WJA; ICAO: none

Summary
- Serves: Woja, Ailinglaplap Atoll, Marshall Islands
- Coordinates: 7°27′03″N 168°33′00″E
- Interactive map of Woja Airport
- Source: Great Circle Mapper

Woja Airport (IATA: WJA) is a public use airstrip at Woja on Ailinglaplap Atoll, Marshall Islands. This airstrip is assigned the location identifier WJA by the IATA.

== Airlines and destinations ==
Air Marshall Islands connects Woja Airport to Jabot Airport, Jeh Airport and Bucholz Army Airfield (Kwajalein).
