= Ailuk Airport =

Airport in Marshall Islands

- IATA: AIM; ICAO: none

Summary
- Airport type: Public
- Serves: Ailuk Atoll, Marshall Islands
- Coordinates: 10°13′01″N 169°59′0″E
- Interactive map of Ailuk Airport

Runways
Direction	Length		Surface
Direction	ft	m	Surface
	2,150	655	Turf

Ailuk Airport (IATA: AIM) is a public use airstrip on Ailuk Atoll, Marshall Islands.

== Airlines and destinations ==
Air Marshall Islands connects Ailuk Airport to Bucholz Army Airfield (Kwajalein), Marshall Islands International Airport (Majuro), and Mejit Airport.
