= Mili Atoll =

Coral atoll in the Ratak Chain, Pacific Ocean

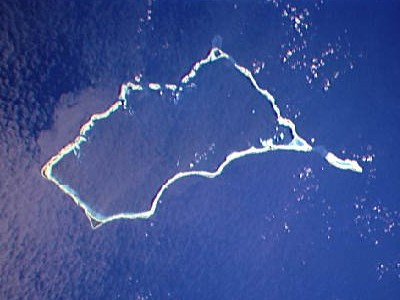
- NASA picture of Mili Atoll

- Location within Marshall Islands

Geography
- Location: North Pacific
- Coordinates: 06°08′N 171°55′E
- Archipelago: Ratak
- Total islands: 92
- Area: 14.9 km^{2} (5.8 sq mi)
- Highest elevation: 3 m (10 ft)

Administration
- Marshall Islands

Demographics
- Population: 497 (2021)
- Ethnic groups: Marshallese

Location of Mili Atoll in the Pacific Ocean.

Mili Atoll (Marshallese: Mile, [mʲilʲe]) is a coral atoll of 92 islands in the Pacific Ocean, and forms a legislative district of the Ratak Chain of the Marshall Islands. It is located approximately 78 kilometers (48 mi) southeast of Arno. Its total land area is 14.9 square kilometers (5.8 sq mi) making it the second-largest of the Marshall Islands after Kwajalein.

It encloses a much smaller lagoon than Kwajalein, with an area of 760 square kilometers (290 sq mi). The atoll is separated by a water channel called the Klee Passage from the Knox Atoll which is considerably smaller.

The population of Mili Atoll was 497 at the 2021 census. The main village is also called Mili. Other villages include Nallu, Enejet, Lukonor, Tokewa, and Wau, Mili.

Nallu, Enejet and Lukonwor are accessible from Mili by land only during lowtide. Only Mili and Enejet have runways for small aircraft. Mili Airport and Enejit Airport are served by Air Marshall Islands when its aircraft are operational.

== History ==
The British merchant vessel Rolla sighted several islands in the Ratak and Ralik Chains. On October 20, 1803, she sighted islands at 5°41′N 169°27′E, which was possibly Mili Atoll. Captain Cummings sent in a cutter, but the heavy surf prevented it from landing. Rolla had transported convicts from Britain to New South Wales and was on her way to Canton to find a cargo to take back to Britain.

In the early 19th century, Mili and Knox Atolls were designated the Mulgrave Islands by Adam Johann von Krusenstern. In 1823 the mutinous crew of the whaler Globe, out of Nantucket, Massachusetts, brought their ship to Mili Atoll. The mutineers, led by Samuel B. Comstock, had killed Globe's captain and her three officers. A few days after she anchored at Mili Atoll, Comstock was murdered by co-mutineer Silas Payne. Six of the crew fled in the ship, leaving nine men stranded on the island. By the time the U.S. schooner Dolphin, commanded by Lieutenant Commander John Percival, arrived to rescue them two years later, the islanders had killed all but two of the crew members.

The infamous blackbirder Bully Hayes owned Tokowa Islet on Mili during the late 19th century and used it as a base for his operations. Mili Atoll was claimed by the German Empire along with the rest of the Marshall Islands in 1885.

According to some theorists who advocate for the Japanese capture hypothesis of Amelia Earhart, Mili Atoll might have been where Earhart and Fred Noonan landed in 1937 after failing to make it to Howland Island. Evidence of this actually occurring, however, is largely based on unreliable eyewitness testimony rather than conclusive physical evidence; most historians believe Earhart and Noonan would have had no reason to attempt to come to Mili, and if they had, they would have run out of fuel before making it in any case.

=== World War II ===
After World War I, the island came under the South Seas Mandate of the Empire of Japan. Mili housed a radio direction finding beacon and a weather station and the atoll was fortified by the Japanese military. The garrison was composed of 2,045 men of the Imperial Japanese Navy and 2,237 men of the Imperial Japanese Army. In 1942 a seaplane base was developed. Between late 1942 and late 1943, the Japanese also constructed an airfield with three runways (4750 ft, 4550 ft and 4400 ft), and numerous support buildings, including a radar station. Korean and Marshellese forced laborers were used for the task; around 800 to 1,000 Koreans were moved to the island. The perimeter of the island was fortified with coastal defense and anti-aircraft guns. Between mid-1943 and August 1945, Mili was bombed by United States Navy carrier-based aircraft and shelled by warships. The attacks increased in frequency and severity after Majuro and Kwajalein had fallen to the United States. Of the 5100-man Japanese garrison (2,600 Imperial Japanese Navy and 2,500 Imperial Japanese Army) only half survived to the end of the war. On 22 August 1945 the Japanese garrison commander surrendered his forces on board the USS Levy.

==== Alleged forced cannibalism and Korean rebellion ====
According to various testimonies published beginning in 2010 and affirmed by at least one Japanese researcher and by the South Korean government, amidst dwindling food supplies, in early 1945, Japanese soldiers gave Koreans "whale meat" to consume, which was actually human flesh from other dead Koreans. After learning the truth, the Koreans rebelled and killed 11 Japanese guards. The following day, Japanese troops from a neighboring island mounted a punitive attack. The Korean rebellion was quashed, and at least 32 were executed by firing squad and an additional 23 died by suicide. From 1942 to 1945, around 218 Koreans died on Mili Atoll.

=== Post-war ===
Following the end of World War II, Mili Atoll came under the control of the United States as part of the Trust Territory of the Pacific Islands. The island has been part of the independent Republic of the Marshall Islands since 1986.

Mili remains littered with thousands of World War II relics. The law forbids these items from being removed from the island. Mostly what remains are large bunker systems, rail systems, old artillery pieces and remnants of aircraft. Examples include Japanese Mitsubishi A6M Zeros, a wrecked Type 97 Naval Bomber (Nakajima B5N), A wrecked Navy Type 1 Land-Based Twin Engine Bomber (Mitsubishi G4M), two wreckages of Lockheed P-38 Lightnings and a North American B-25 Mitchell bomber sitting in just several feet of water. The ground is still covered with craters created by the artillery campaigns that lasted 30 days to "prep" the island for the Allied invasion.

While thousands of unexploded munitions were destroyed by Peace Corps volunteers in the 1960s, danger remains for humans from chemicals in Japanese and U.S. unexploded munitions on land and in the ocean (which could enter the food chain).

== Education ==
Marshall Islands Public School System operates public schools:

- Enejet Elementary School
- Lukonwod Elementary School
- Mili Elementary School
- Nallo Elementary School
- Tokewa Elementary School

Marshall Islands High School on Majuro serves the community.

== Famous person ==
- Mattie Sasser, weightlifter

== See also ==
- Attongtonganebwokwbwokw
- Naval Base Kwajalein
