= Majkin Airport =

Airport in Marshall Islands

- IATA: MJE; ICAO: none

Summary
- Airport type: Public
- Serves: Majkin, Namu Atoll, Marshall Islands
- Coordinates: 08°09′48″N 168°10′26″E
- Interactive map of Majkin Airport
- Source: Great Circle Mapper

Majkin Airport is a public use airstrip at Majkin on Namu Atoll, Marshall Islands.

== Airlines and destinations ==
Air Marshall Islands connects Majkin Airport to Jeh Airport, Bucholz Army Airfield (Kwajalein), and Marshall Islands International Airport (Majuro).
