= Namorik Airport =

- IATA: NDK; ICAO: none; FAA LID: 3N0

Summary
- Serves: Namdrik, Namdrik Atoll, Marshall Islands
- Elevation AMSL: 15 ft (4.6 m)
- Coordinates: 05°37′59″N 168°07′33″E
- Interactive map of Namorik Airport

Runways
Direction	Length		Surface
Direction	ft	m	Surface
07/25	2,900	884	Coral gravel
- Source: Federal Aviation Administration

Namorik Airport (or Namdrik Airport) is a public use airstrip located at Namdrik on Namdrik Atoll, Marshall Islands. This airstrip is assigned the location identifier 3N0 by the FAA and NDK by the IATA.

== Facilities ==
Namorik Airport is at an elevation of 15 feet (4.6 m) above mean sea level. The runway is designated 07/25 with a coral gravel surface measuring 2,900 by 45 feet (884 x 14 m). There are no aircraft based at Namorik.

== Airlines and destinations ==
Air Marshall Islands connects Namorik Airport to Marshall Islands International Airport (Majuro).
