= Utirik Airport =

- IATA: UTK; ICAO: none; FAA LID: 03N

Summary
- Serves: Utirik, Utirik Atoll, Marshall Islands
- Elevation AMSL: 4 ft (1.2 m)
- Coordinates: 11°13′21″N 169°51′10″E
- Interactive map of Utirik Airport

Runways
Direction	Length		Surface
Direction	ft	m	Surface
07/25	2,400	732	Coral gravel
- Source: Federal Aviation Administration

Utirik Airport is a public use airstrip on Utirik Island in Utirik Atoll, Marshall Islands. This airstrip is assigned the location identifier 03N by the FAA and UTK by the IATA.

== Facilities ==
Utirik Airport is at an elevation of 4 feet (1.2 m) above mean sea level. The runway is designated 07/25 with a coral gravel surface measuring 2,400 by 50 feet (732 x 15 m). There are no aircraft based at Utirik.

== Airlines and destinations ==
Air Marshall Islands connects Utirik Airport to Marshall Islands International Airport (Majuro).
