= Wotje Airport =

- IATA: WTE; ICAO: none; FAA LID: N36

Summary
- Serves: Wotje, Wotje Atoll, Marshall Islands
- Elevation AMSL: 4 ft (1.2 m)
- Coordinates: 09°27′30″N 170°14′19″E
- Interactive map of Wotje Airport

Runways
Direction	Length		Surface
Direction	ft	m	Surface
13/31	4,275	1,303	Turf
- Source: Federal Aviation Administration

Wotje Airport is a public use airstrip located in the village of Wotje on Wotje Atoll, Marshall Islands. This airstrip is assigned the location identifier N36 by the FAA and WTE by the IATA.

== Facilities ==
Wotje Airport is at an elevation of 4 feet (1.2 m) above mean sea level. The runway is designated 13/31 with a turf surface measuring 4,275 by 75 feet (1,303 x 23 m). There are no aircraft based at Wotje.

== Airlines and destinations ==
Air Marshall Islands connects Wotje Airport to Marshall Islands International Airport (Majuro).
