= Enewetak Auxiliary Airfield =

Airport in Marshall Islands

- Enewetak Island, Enewetak Atoll in the Marshall Islands
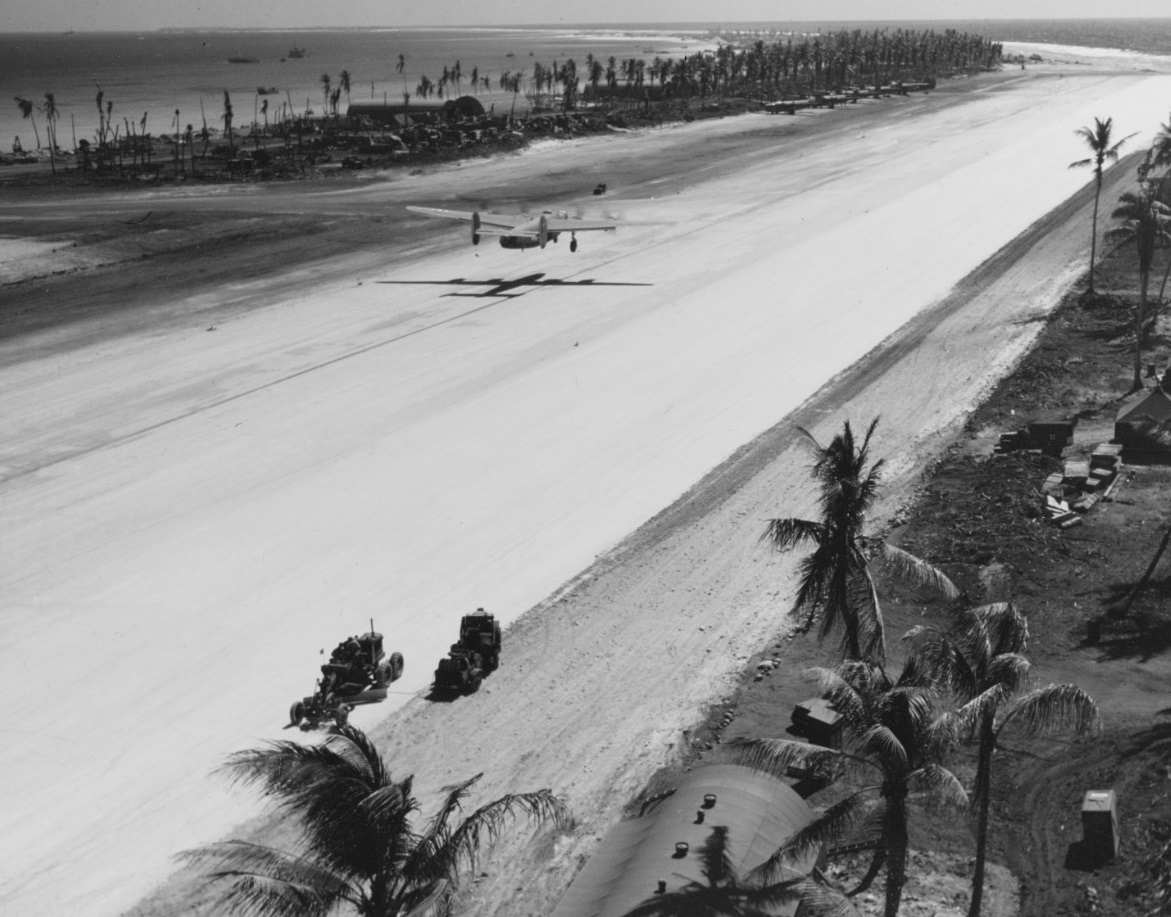
- A U.S. Navy PB4Y-1 Liberator departs the airfield, April 1944

Site information
- Owner: Defense Threat Reduction Agency
- Controlled by: United States Air Force

Location
- Location within Marshall Islands Location within Pacific Ocean
- Coordinates: 11°20.45′N 162°19.67′E

Site history
- Built: February – April 1944

Airfield information
- Identifiers: IATA: ENT, ICAO: PKMA
- Elevation: 13 feet (4 m) AMSL
Runways
Direction	Length and surface
06/24	7,700 feet (2,347 m) Asphalt
- Sources: DoD FLIP

Enewetak Auxiliary Airfield (formerly Stickell Field) is a military airfield on Enewetak Island, Enewetak Atoll, Marshall Islands. Originally built for the United States Navy during World War II, the airport is currently operated by the United States Air Force (USAF) on behalf of the Defense Threat Reduction Agency (DTRA).

== History ==
Originally built as part of Naval Base Eniwetok, construction on the airfield began in late February 1944, with the first plane landing on 11 March, and the first mission executed by a permanently stationed bomber unit flown from the field on 5 April.

The runway underwent repair and restoration work between 1974 and 1976 in order for the airfield to support the radiological cleanup of Enewetak Atoll in the aftermath of nuclear weapons testing on the atoll between 1948 and 1958.

== Airlines and destinations ==
Air Marshall Islands connects Enewetak Airfield to Bucholz Army Airfield (Kwajalein).
