= Maloelap Atoll =

Coral atoll in the Marshall Islands

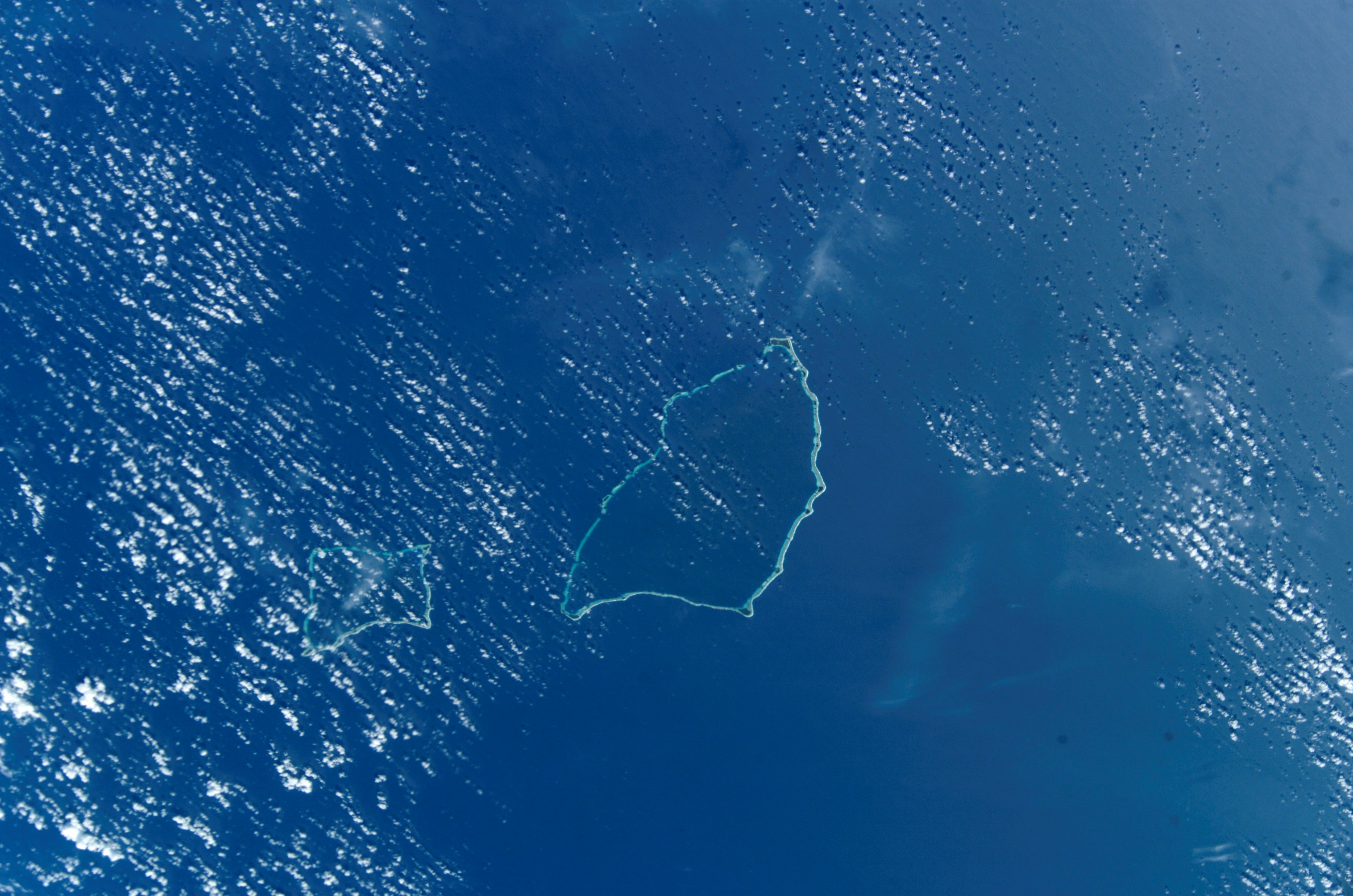
- NASA picture of Maloelap Atoll

- Location within Marshall Islands

Geography
- Location: North Pacific
- Coordinates: 08°45′00″N 171°04′00″E
- Archipelago: Ratak
- Total islands: 71
- Area: 9.8 km^{2} (3.8 sq mi)
- Highest elevation: 3 m (10 ft)

Administration
- Marshall Islands

Demographics
- Population: 395 (2021)
- Ethnic groups: Marshallese

The Maloelap Atoll (Marshallese: M̧aļoeļap, [mˠɑlˠɔːɛlˠɑpʲ]) (also spelled Maleolap) is a coral atoll of 71 islands in the Pacific Ocean, and forms a legislative district of the Ratak Chain of the Marshall Islands. Its land area is only 9.8 square kilometers (3.8 sq mi), but that encloses a lagoon of 972 square kilometers (375 sq mi). It is located 18 kilometers (11 mi) north of the atoll of Aur. The population of the atoll was 395 at the 2021 census.

The largest of the islands that make up the atoll are Taroa (the administrative center of the atoll), in the northeast, and Kaben in the northwest. Only three of the other islands in the atoll are inhabited: Airuk, Wolot and Jang. The island is served by Air Marshall Islands via Maloelap Airport.

== History ==
Maloelap Atoll was claimed by the German Empire along with the rest of the Marshall Islands in 1885. After World War I, the island came under the South Seas Mandate of the Empire of Japan.

In 1939, the Japanese built a seaplane base and landplane Taroa Airfield with two runways (4800' + 4100') and support buildings and facilities, including a radar station. During World War II the Japanese garrison of 2,940 navy men and 389 army men was commanded by Rear Admiral Shoichi Kamada. The perimeter of the island was heavily fortified with 12 heavy coastal artillery and 10 heavy anti-aircraft guns. The island was attacked by the United States Navy beginning in February 1942 starting with carrier-based aircraft and shelling by warships. The attacks grew in frequency and severity after Majuro and Kwajalein had fallen to the Americans. Of the 3097-man Japanese garrison (1772 Imperial Japanese Navy, 368 Imperial Japanese Army, and 957 civilians) only 1041 (34%) survived the war. Several Marshallese were also killed. A large number of war relics, including plane wrecks, mainly Mitsubishi A6M Zero fighters and Mitsubishi G4M Betty bombers remain scattered about.

Following the end of World War II, the island came under the control of the United States as part of the Trust Territory of the Pacific Islands until the independence of the Marshall Islands in 1986. Maloelap Atoll was the first to ratify the Marshall Islands' constitution.

== Education ==
Marshall Islands Public School System operates public schools:

- Aerok Elementary School
- Jang Elementary School
- Kaben Elementary School
- Ollet Elementary School
- Tarawa Elementary School

Northern Islands High School on Wotje serves the community.
