= Enejit Airport =

Airport in Marshall Islands

- IATA: EJT; ICAO: none

Summary
- Airport type: Public
- Serves: Enejit, Mili Atoll, Marshall Islands
- Coordinates: 06°02′25″N 171°59′04″E
- Interactive map of Enejit Airport

Enejit Airport is a public use airstrip at Enejit on Mili Atoll, Marshall Islands.

== Airlines and destinations ==
Air Marshall Islands connects Enejit Airport to Marshall Islands International Airport (Majuro).
