= Bikini Atoll Airport =

Airport in Marshall Islands

- IATA: BII; ICAO: none

Summary
- Serves: Enyu, Bikini Atoll, Marshall Islands
- Coordinates: 11°31′22″N 165°34′1″E
- Interactive map of Bikini Atoll Airport

Runways
Direction	Length		Surface
Direction	ft	m	Surface
04/22	4,460	1,359	Asphalt
- Source: Great Circle Mapper

Bikini Atoll Airport, also known as Enyu Airfield, is a public use airstrip at Enyu on Bikini Atoll, Marshall Islands. This airstrip is assigned the location identifier BII by the IATA. The airstrip enables access to diving and shipwrecks.

== Facilities ==
Bikini Atoll Airport has one runway measuring 4,460 x 140 ft (1,359 x 42.5 m).

== Airlines and destinations ==
Air Marshall Islands connects Bikini Atoll Airport to Bucholz Army Airfield (Kwajalein), Marshall Islands International Airport (Majuro), and Rongelap Airport.
