= Mejit Airport =

Airport on Mejit Island, Marshall Islands

- IATA: MJB; ICAO: none; FAA LID: Q30

Summary
- Serves: Mejit Island, Marshall Islands
- Elevation AMSL: 5 ft (1.5 m)
- Coordinates: 010°17′00″N 170°52′8.4″E
- Interactive map of Mejit Airport

Runways
Direction	Length		Surface
Direction	ft	m	Surface
07/25	3,000	914	Coral gravel
- Source: Federal Aviation Administration

Mejit Airport is a public use airstrip on Mejit Island, Marshall Islands. This airstrip is assigned the location identifier Q30 by the FAA and MJB by the IATA.

== Facilities ==
Mejit Airport is at an elevation of 5 feet (2.5 m) above mean sea level. The runway is designated 07/25 with a coral gravel surface measuring 3,000 by 50 feet (914 x 15 m). There are no aircraft based at Mejit.

== Airlines and destinations ==
Air Marshall Islands connects Mejit Airport to Ailuk Airport and Marshall Islands International Airport (Majuro).
