= Ailinglaplap Atoll =

Coral atoll in the Marshall Islands

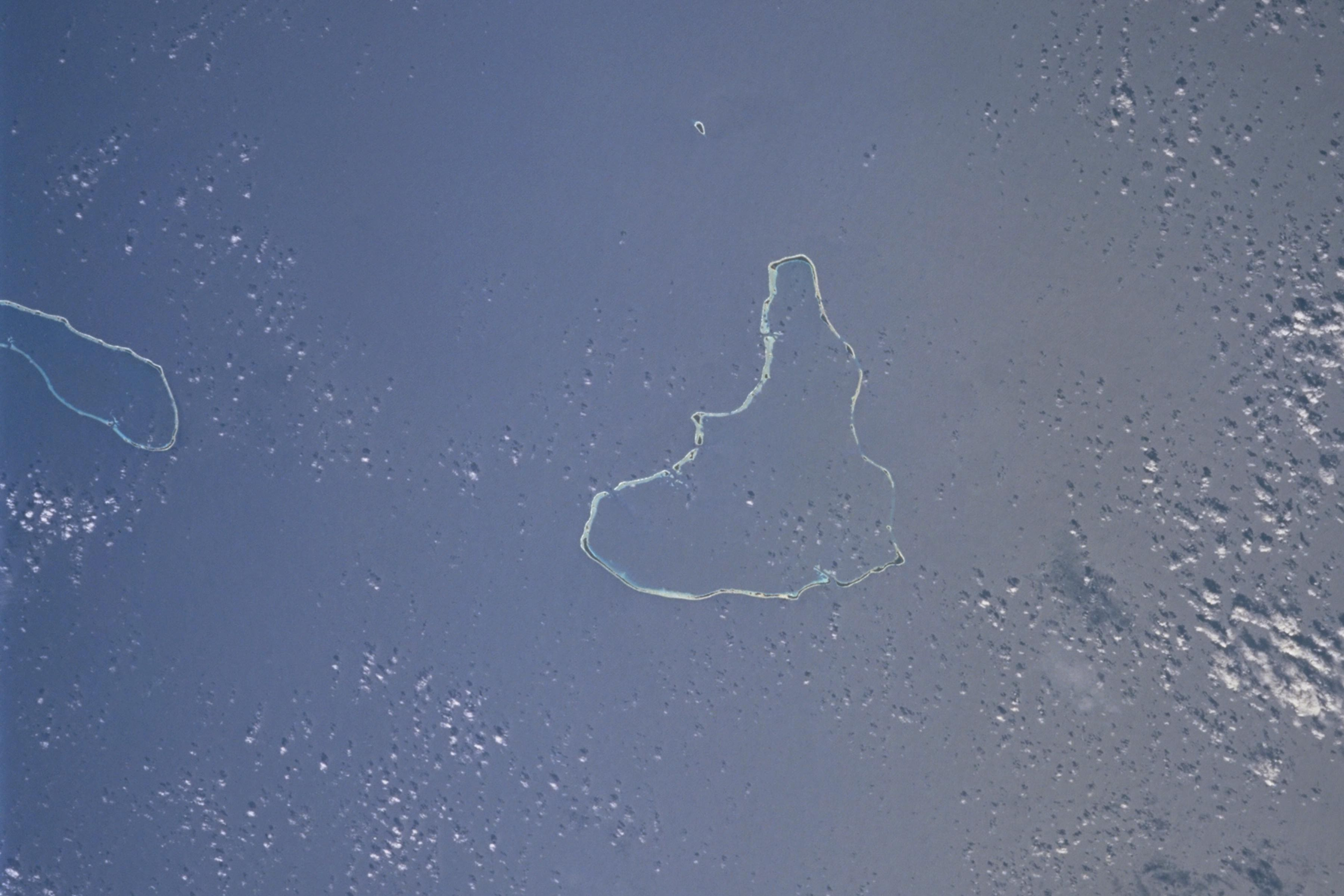
- NASA picture of Ailinglaplap Atoll

- Location in the Marshall Islands

- Location within Marshall Islands

Geography
- Location: North Pacific
- Coordinates: 07°24′N 168°45′E
- Archipelago: Ralik
- Total islands: 56
- Area: 14.7 km^{2} (5.7 sq mi)
- Highest elevation: 3 m (10 ft)

Administration
- Marshall Islands

Demographics
- Population: 1,175 (2021)
- Ethnic groups: Marshallese

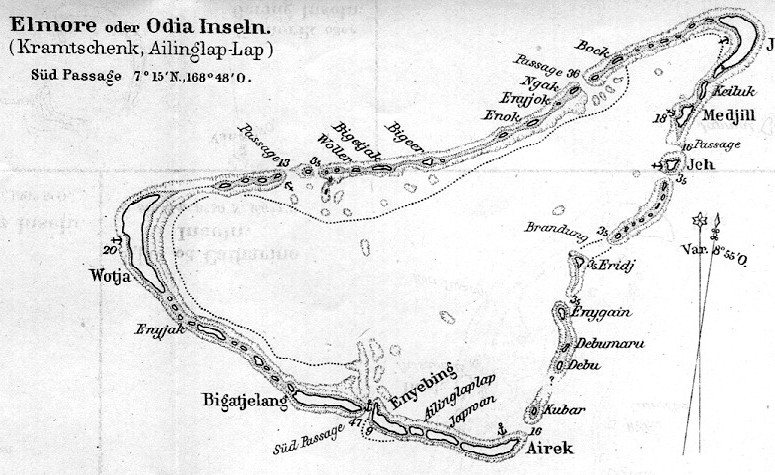
German map of Ailinglaplap

Ailinglaplap or Ailinglapalap (Marshallese: Aelōn̄ļapļap, [ɑelʲɤŋ(ɤ)lˠɑbʲ(ɛ)lˠɑpʲ]) is a coral atoll of 56 islands in the Pacific Ocean, and forms a legislative district of the Ralik Chain in the Marshall Islands. It is located 152 kilometres (94 mi) northwest of Jaluit Atoll. Its total land area is only 14.7 square kilometers (5.7 sq mi), but it encloses a lagoon of 750 square kilometers (290 sq mi). The economy of the atoll is dominated by coconut plantations. The population of the atoll was 1,175 in 2021. Jabat Island is located off the coast of Ailinglaplap Atoll. The former president of the Marshall Islands, Kessai Note, was born on Jeh Island, Ailinglaplap Atoll.

"Ailinglaplap" translates as "greatest atoll" (aelōn̄ (atoll) + ļapļap (superlative suffix)), because the greatest legends of the Marshallese people were created there. The four major population centers on Ailinglaplap Atoll are the settlements of Wotja, at the westernmost end of the atoll, Jih in the northeast, and Airek and Bigatjelang in the south.

== History ==
Captain Thomas Dennet of the British vessel Britannia sighted the atoll in 1797 on route from Australia to China and named it Lambert Island. The British merchant vessel Rolla sighted several islands in the Ratak and Ralik Chains. On 6 November 1803 she sighted islands at 7°12′N 166°40′E, which was possibly Ailinglaplap Atoll. The next day six canoes of friendly natives came off. Rolla had transported convicts from Britain to New South Wales and was on her way to Canton to find a cargo to take back to Britain.

In 1885, the German Empire claimed Ailinglaplap Atoll along with the rest of the Marshall Islands. A number of European trading stations were established on the islands to Ailingkaplap as part of the copra trade. After World War I, the island came under the South Seas Mandate of the Empire of Japan. The base became part of the vast US Naval Base Marshall Islands. Following the end of World War II, it came under the control of the United States as part of the Trust Territory of the Pacific Islands until the independence of the Marshall Islands in 1986.

There are currently 4 Iroijlaplap (or paramount chief) of Ailinglaplap.

== Infrastructure ==
There are 3 airstrips on the atoll, which are served by Air Marshall Islands when its aircraft are operational:

- Ailinglaplap Airok Airport (IATA: AIC) is located to the south: 7°16′45″N 168°49′32″E.
- Jeh Airport (IATA: JEJ) is located to the northeast: 7°33′54″N 168°57′42″E.
- Woja Airport (IATA: WJA) is located to west: 7°27′03″N 168°33′00″E.

== Education ==
Marshall Islands Public School System operates public schools:

- Aerok Ailinglaplap
- Buoj Elementary School
- Enewa Elementary School
- Jah Elementary School
- Jeh Elementary School
- Jobwon Elementary School
- Katiej Elementary School
- Mejel Elementary School
- Woja Elementary School

Students are zoned to Jaluit High School in Jaluit Atoll.

In the 1994–1995 school year Ailinglaplap had one private high school.
