= Kaben =

Coordinates: 8°53′36″N 170°50′42″E

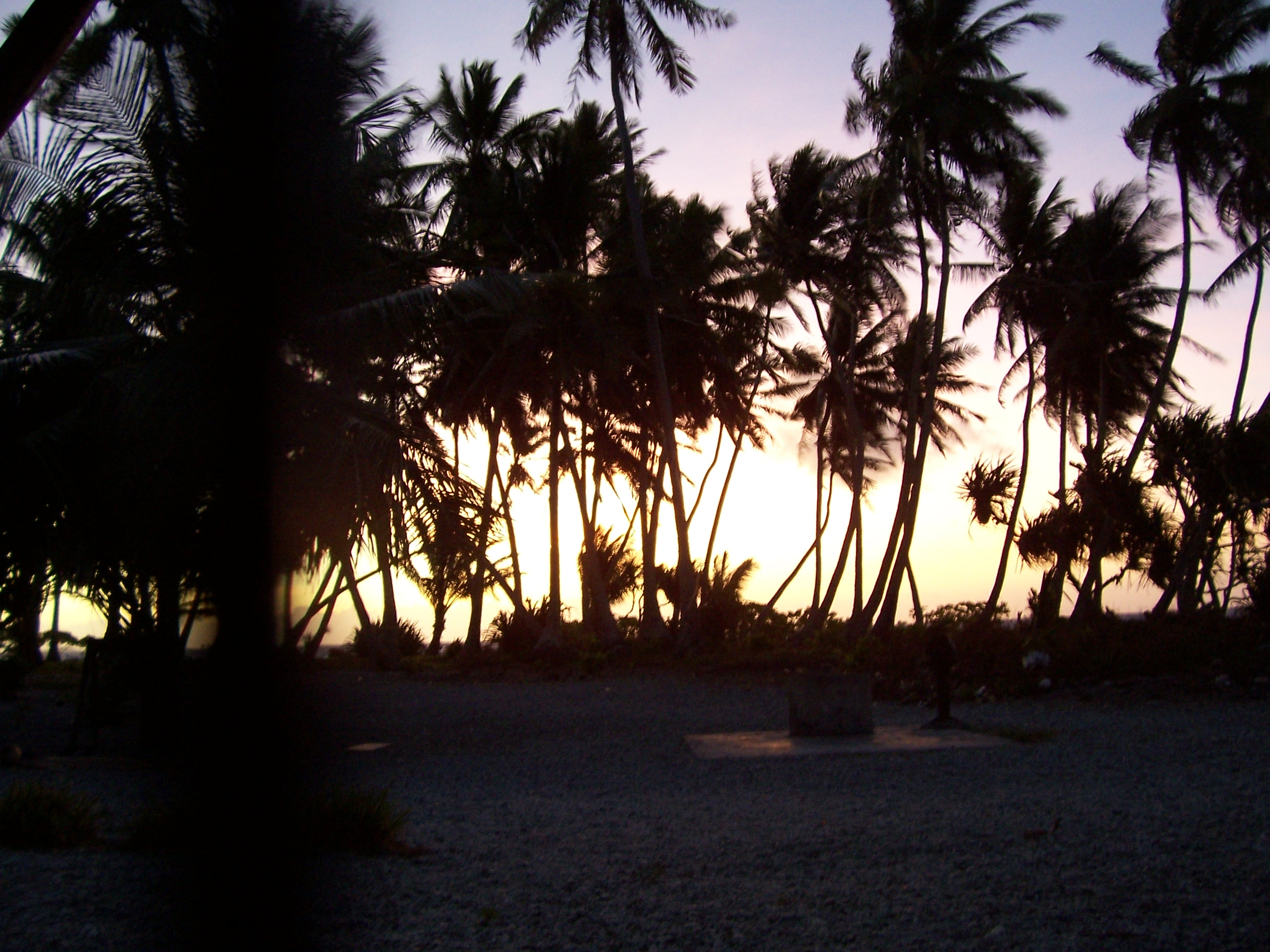
Sunrise on Kaven

Kaven (also Kaben) is a small island in the Maloelap Atoll in the Republic of the Marshall Islands. Situated at the northwesternmost tip of the atoll, it is the largest island and one of the few inhabited ones on the atoll. Together with a few other small islands, it forms part of the "outer islands" of the Marshalls. The island is located to the east of the Likiep Atoll, between Jeltonet in the southwest and Anejaej in the northwest. The southwesternmost tip of the island is called Anenemmwaan also. The region is uninhabited.

== Geography ==
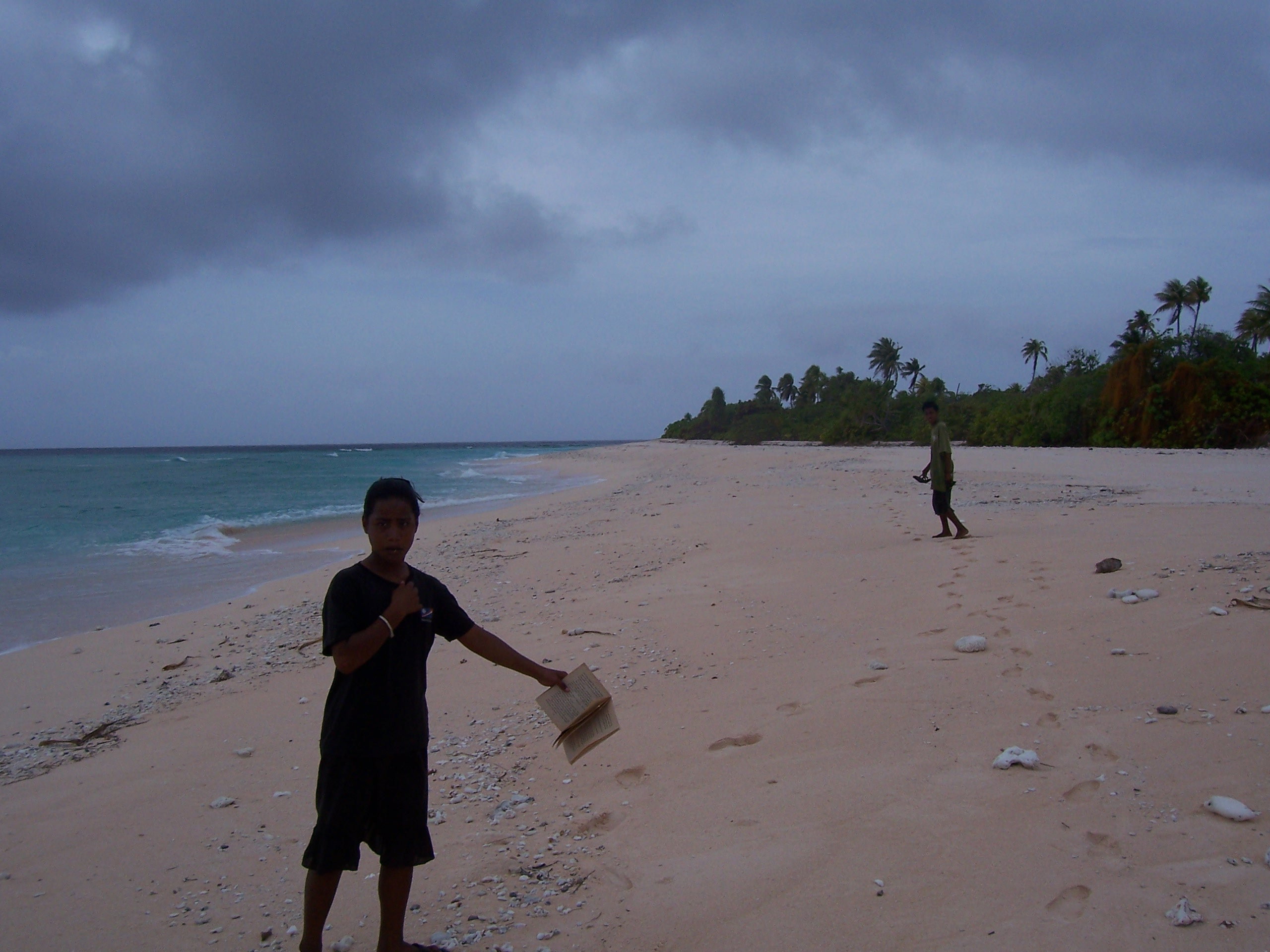
Kaben, Ocean Side

Kaben is a small island, no more than 2.5 kilometers long and a kilometer across. The island has around 1-square-mile (2.6 km^{2}) in area. It is almost rectangularly-shaped, with a slight hooklike protuberance on the northeastern region of the island. Kaben is lightly inhabited, having had a few man-made structures erected along its southeast coast.

== History ==
Historically, the island has been claimed by the Iroij, royalty of the islands, as their personal property prohibiting peasant islanders from fishing the island's waters. Fishing by local islanders only resumed when an official government for the islands was formed and fishing was officially declared permissible. As the largest island in the atoll, Iroij coronation events have traditionally taken place on Kaben. The island has several myths and legends surrounding it and its remote waters.

== Flora and Fauna ==
The fauna of the island is similar to that of the other islands in the Marshalls. Terrestrial fauna is limited to small crustaceans such as the hermit crabs Coenobita and land crabs from the family Gecarcinidae. Historically, the island has been cited as the home for a large population of edible coconut crabs.

Plants include coconut palms (Cocos nucifera), pandanus trees (Pandanus tectorius), Scaevola taccada, Tournefortia argentea, Casuarina equisetifolia and Ipomoea pes-caprae.

== Airport ==
The Kaven Island has an airport, Kaben Airport (IATA: KBT). However, airport is a misnomer. It is a simple airstrip without any major airport facilities. A 2000 Technical Assistance Report by the Asian Development Bank suggested that, for infrastructure development, the runways of several airstrips throughout the Marshall Islands, including the one on Kaven, be rehabilitated. This rehabilitation was suggested to include de-forestation of the vegetation surrounding the airstrip and the construction of adequate aero-navigational facilities. Not to be confused: On the main Likiep Atoll is an even larger airport, too.

== Famous Person ==
- Roman Cress, sprinter

== See also ==
- Geography of the Marshall Islands

== Bibliography ==
- Trip report to Kaven on water quality
- U.S. Geological Survey Geographic Names Information System: Kaben
