= Taroa Airfield =

Air base in the Marshall Islands

Coordinates: 08°42′19″N 171°13′50″E

Taroa Airfield was a major air base approximately three miles long and one mile wide on Taroa Island in the Maloelap Atoll in the Marshall Islands. The runway, which spanned the length of the island, is still in use today and known as Maloelap Airport (Airport Code: MAV).

== World War II ==
During World War II, Taroa Airfield was the easternmost Japanese air base. It was a favorite target for Allied bombers from Makin Airfield, Tarawa, and Abemama and was heavily bombed in 1944. It became part of the vast Naval Base Marshall Islands in 1944.

In an article about Charles Lindbergh's involvement in the Pacific Theater, G. D. Provenza describes Taroa thus:

The target that day was an enemy personnel area on Taroa; this tiny island had already been bombed flat, but hundreds of surviving Japanese troops were reportedly still dug-in there. Over the island at 8,000 feet, Lindbergh pushed forward into a steep 60-degree dive. The enemy gamely fought back, sending up accurate small-arms fire.

A combination of aerial attacks, bombardment from naval ships, and supply line disruption caused many deaths; only 34% of those originally on the island survived. The Japanese abandoned the island on February 5, 1944.

A US Navy reconnaissance photo of this island in 1944 shows a twin-engine twin tail plane that author Randall Brink thinks belonged to missing aviator Amelia Earhart.

== See also ==
- Gilbert and Marshall Islands campaign — World War II
