= Rongelap Airport =

- IATA: RNP; ICAO: none

Summary
- Airport type: Public
- Serves: Rongelap, Rongelap Atoll, Marshall Islands
- Coordinates: 11°09′25.8″N 166°53′15.6″E
- Interactive map of Rongelap Airport

Runways
Direction	Length		Surface
Direction	ft	m	Surface
10/28	3,950	1,204	Asphalt
- Source: Great Circle Mapper

Rongelap Airport is a public use airstrip at Rongelap on Rongelap Atoll, Marshall Islands.

== Facilities ==
Rongelap Airport has one runway measuring 3,950 x 100 ft (1,204 x 30 m).

== Airlines and destinations ==
Air Marshall Islands connects Rongelap Airport to Bikini Atoll Airport and Elenak Airport.
