= Aur Airport =

Airport in Marshall Islands

- IATA: AUL; ICAO: none

Summary
- Serves: Aur, Aur Atoll, Marshall Islands
- Coordinates: 08°18′10″N 171°09′42″E
- Interactive map of Aur Airport

Runways
| Direction | Length | | Surface |
| Direction | ft | m | Surface |
|---|---|---|---|
| | 2,100 | 640 |
- Source: Great Circle Mapper

Aur Airport is a public use airstrip at Aur on Aur Atoll, Marshall Islands. This airstrip is assigned the location identifier AUL by the IATA.

== Facilities ==
Aur Airport has one runway measuring 2,100 ft (640 m).

== Airlines and destinations ==
Air Marshall Islands connects Aur Airport to Marshall Islands International Airport (Majuro).
