= Lae Airport =

Airport in Marshall Islands

- IATA: LML; ICAO: none

Summary
- Airport type: Public
- Serves: Lae, Lae Atoll, Marshall Islands
- Coordinates: 08°55′18″N 166°15′56″E
- Interactive map of Lae Airport

Runways
Direction	Length		Surface
Direction	ft	m	Surface
	1,950	594	Turf
- Source: Great Circle Mapper

Lae Airport is a public use airport at Lae on Lae Atoll, Marshall Islands.

== Airlines and destinations ==
Air Marshall Islands connects Lae Airport to Bucholz Army Airfield (Kwajalein) and Marshall Islands International Airport (Majuro).
