= Taroa Island =

Island in the Marshall Islands

- Location within Marshall Islands

Geography
- Location: North Pacific Ocean
- Coordinates: 08°42′16″N 171°14′00″E
- Archipelago: Ratak
- Area: 1.83 km^{2} (0.71 sq mi)
- Highest elevation: 8 m (26 ft)

Administration
- Marshall Islands

Demographics
- Population: 130
- Ethnic groups: Marshallese

Taroa is an island in the east of Maloelap Atoll in the Marshall Islands. During World War II, it was the site of a major Japanese airfield (Taroa Airfield). The airfield was destroyed near the close of World War II, and parts of the base and its ruins are still visible all over the island.

The island was not resettled by the Marshallese until the 1970s, but is now the atoll's main economic center due to the re-opened airstrip and local copra production.

== Map ==
1943 Map of the Taroa
