= Jeh Airport =

Airport in Marshall Islands

- IATA: JEJ; ICAO: none

Summary
- Operator: Patrick
- Serves: Jeh, Ailinglaplap Atoll, Marshall Islands
- Coordinates: 07°33′54″N 168°57′42″E
- Interactive map of Jeh Airport

Runways
| Direction | Length | | Surface |
| Direction | ft | m | Surface |
|---|---|---|---|
| | 3,800 | 1,158 | grass |
- Source: Great Circle Mapper

Jeh Airport (IATA: JEJ) is a public use airstrip at Jeh on Ailinglaplap Atoll, Marshall Islands. This airstrip is assigned the location identifier JEJ by the IATA.

== Facilities ==
Jeh Airport has one runway measuring 3,800 ft (1,158 m).

== Airlines and destinations ==
Air Marshall Islands connects Jeh Airport to Bucholz Army Airfield (Kwajalein), Majkin Airport, and Marshall Islands International Airport (Majuro).
