= Bucholz Army Airfield =

Airport in Kwajalein, Marshall Islands

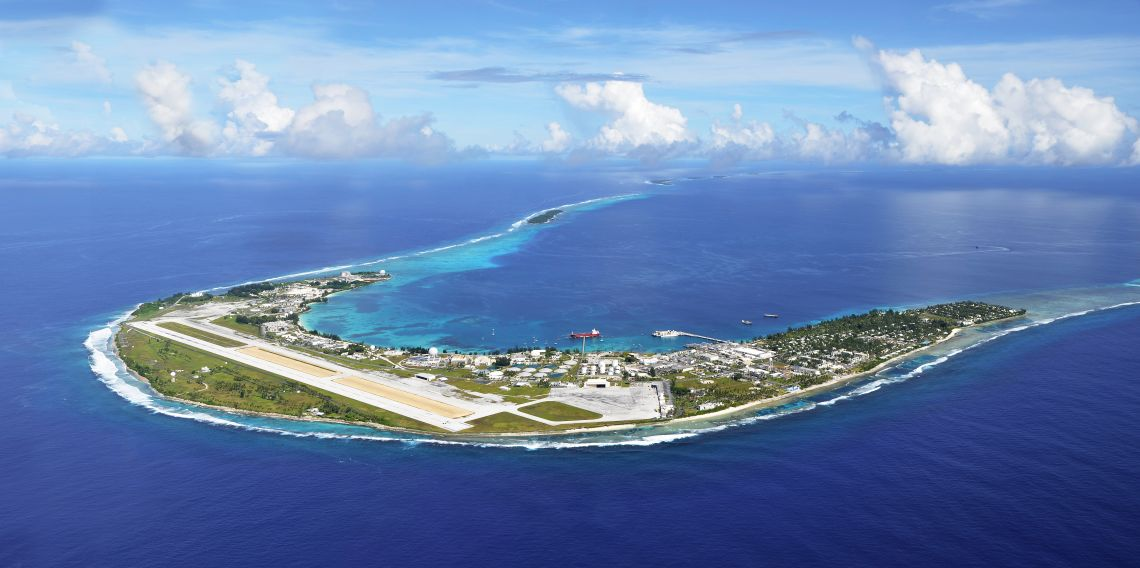
- IATA: KWA; ICAO: PKWA; FAA LID: KWA

Summary
- Airport type: Military
- Operator: United States Army
- Location: Kwajalein
- Elevation AMSL: 9 ft / 3 m
- Coordinates: 08°43′12″N 167°43′54″E

Map

Runways
Direction	Length		Surface
Direction	ft	m	Surface
06/24	6,668	2,032	Asphalt

Bucholz Army Airfield (IATA: KWA, ICAO: PKWA, FAA LID: KWA) is a United States Army airfield located on Kwajalein Atoll, Marshall Islands. Its position is ideal for refueling during trans-Pacific flights, and the airport is available to civilians through Air Marshall Islands and United Airlines, mostly for the Island Hopper.

Since the entirety of Kwajalein Atoll is a military base, non-military passengers on commercial flights are transported to and from the neighboring island of Ebeye, the civilian population center of Kwajalein Atoll.

== History ==
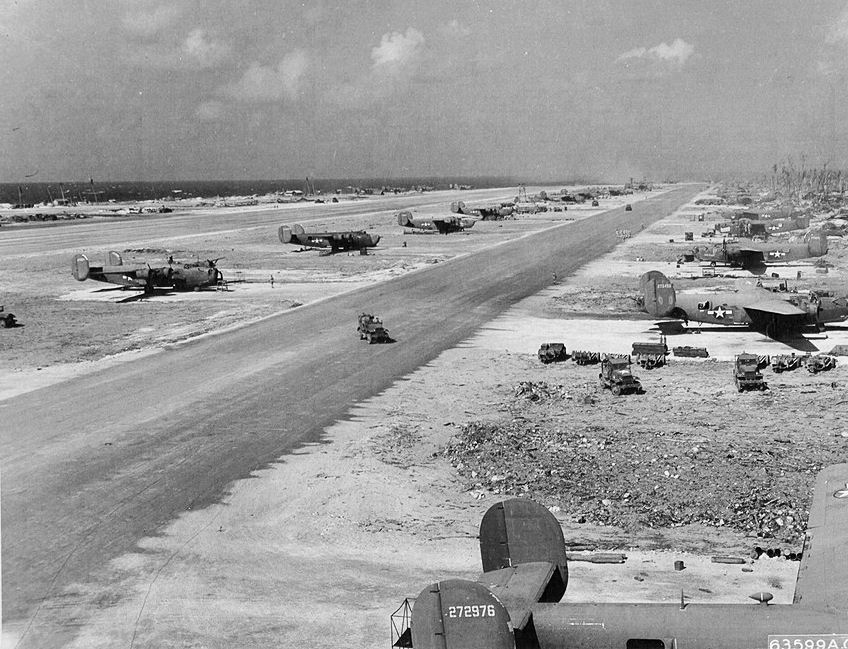
30th Bombardment Group B-24 Liberators at Kwajalein Airfield, 1944

After the defeat of the Japanese, Kwajalein was developed into a United States military airbase and staging area for further operations by Seabees of the 109th Naval Construction Battalion.

After the war, the United States used Kwajalein as a main command center and preparation base for Operation Crossroads and an extensive series of nuclear tests (comprising a total of 67 blasts) at the Marshalls' atolls of Bikini and Enewetak.

On Memorial Day 1967, Kwajalein Airfield was renamed Bucholz Army Airfield after PFC Fred Henry Bucholz (1907–1944), posthumous recipient of the Distinguished Service Cross for extraordinary heroism in the Battle of Kwajalein.

Passengers on United's Island Hopper service may not disembark the aircraft at Kwajalein unless they have prior authorization from the U.S. government. Photography and videography while at the airport are also restricted.

== Airlines and destinations ==
Airlines	Destinations	Refs.
Air Marshall Islands	Ailuk, Elenak, Lae, Majkin, Majuro, Woja, Wotho	
United Airlines	Chuuk, Guam, Honolulu, Kosrae, Majuro, Pohnpei	

== See also ==
- Island Hopper scheduled air service
- List of United States Army airfields
- USAAF in the Central Pacific
