= Air Marshall Islands =

Flag carrier of the Marshall Islands

| IATA | ICAO | Call sign |
|---|---|---|
| CW | CWM | MARSHALL ISLANDS |
- Founded: 1980; 46 years ago
- Hubs: Amata Kabua International Airport
- Fleet size: 5
- Destinations: 28
- Headquarters: Majuro
- Key people: Albon Jelke (CEO & GM)
- Website: airmarshallislands.net

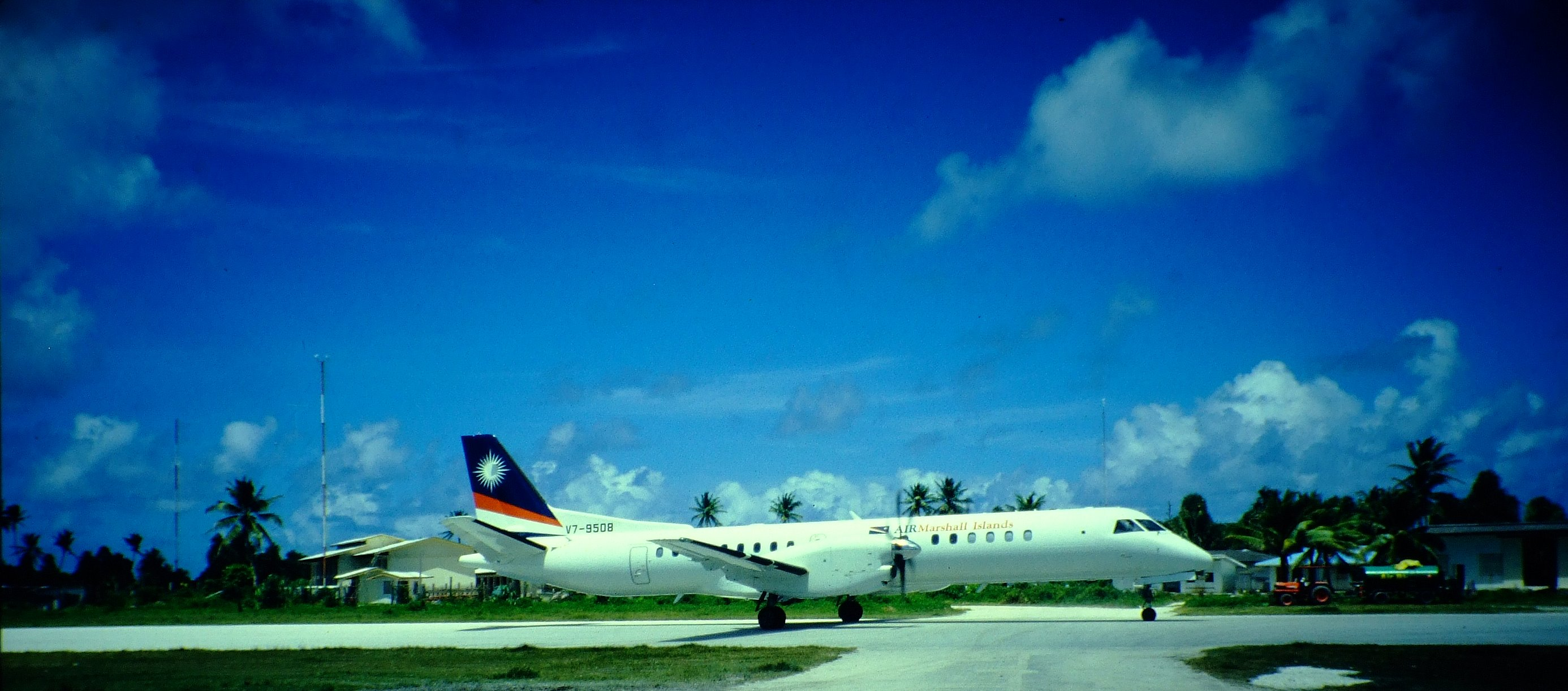
Air Marshall Islands Saab 2000 at Funafuti International Airport, Tuvalu (1996)

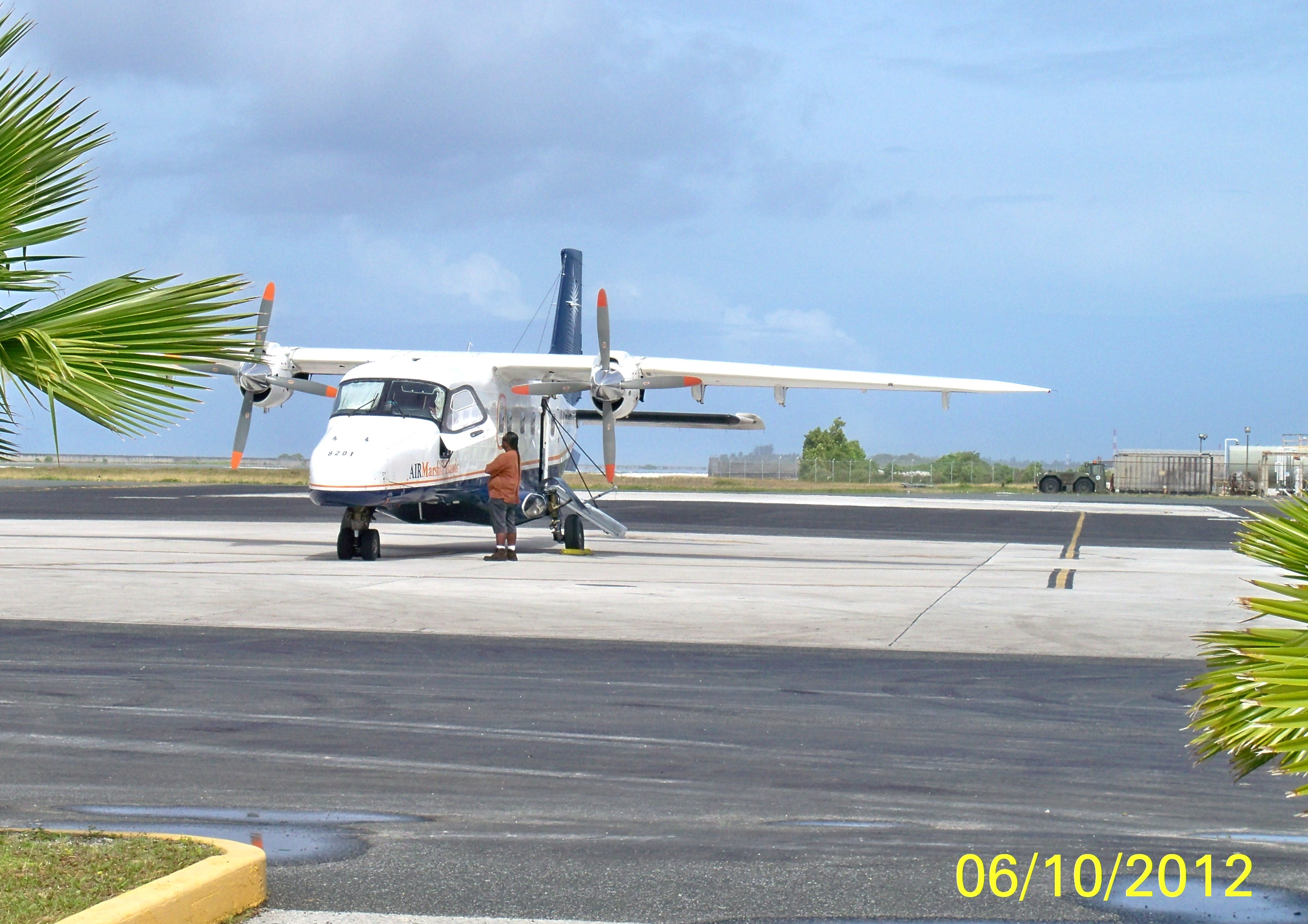
Air Marshall Islands Dornier 228 at Majuro Airport 2012

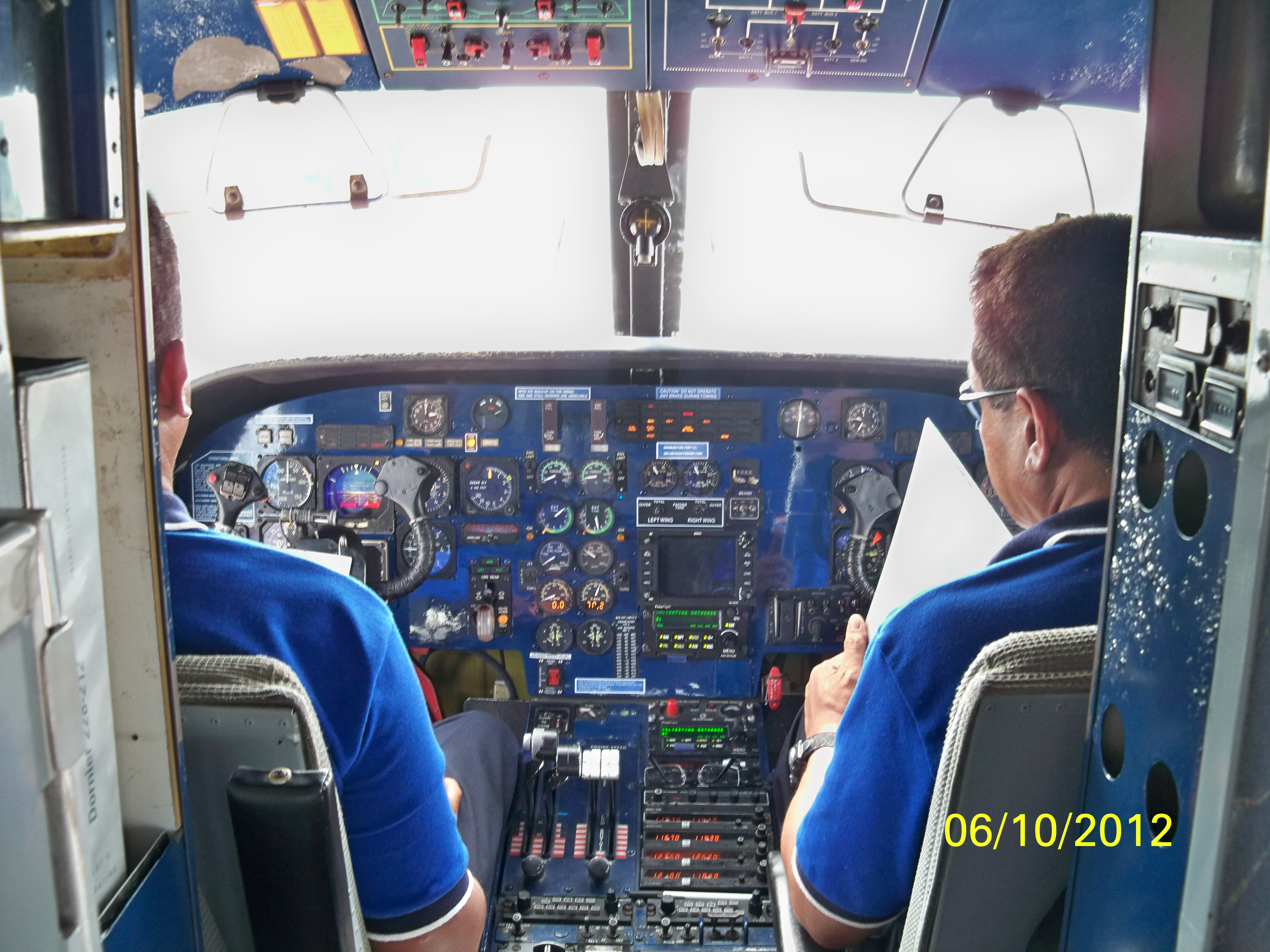
Open cockpit

Air Marshall Islands is an airline based in Majuro, Marshall Islands. It is the flag carrier of the Marshall Islands, operating inter-island services in the Central Pacific. Its main base is Amata Kabua International Airport, Majuro.

== History ==
The airline was established in 1980 as Airline of the Marshall Islands; the current title was adopted in 1989. The airline is wholly owned by the Government of the Marshall Islands.

In January 2009, all flights were suspended while the airline's only plane, a 34-seat Bombardier Dash 8, suffered wing damage after colliding with an FAA antenna tower while being towed. Replacement parts were ordered, but flights were further delayed when the replacement part that arrived in February was for the wrong wing.

== Services ==
The airline's main base is at Majuro; the company operates flights to Bikini Atoll, Enewetak Atoll, Kwajalein Atoll, Rongelap Atoll and Jeh, Airok, and Woja on Ailinglaplap Atoll, etc. The flight schedule has most flights operating on a weekly basis.

Air Marshall Islands has offices providing reservations and flight information services at Majuro, Ebeye and Kwajalein.

=== Airline partnerships ===
Air Marshall Islands currently has a partnership with Nauru Airlines the flag carrier of Nauru.

== Fleet ==
=== Current fleet ===
As of October 2026, Air Marshall Islands operates the following aircraft:

| Aircraft | In service | Orders | Passengers | | | Notes |
| Aircraft | In service | Orders | B | E | Total | Notes |
|---|---|---|---|---|---|---|
| Bombardier Dash 8-100 | Not in Service | — | | | 34 | |
| Cessna 408 SkyCourier | 2 | — | | | 19 | |
| Dornier 228-212 | 2 | — | | | 18 | |
| Total | 5 | | | | | |

=== Former fleet ===
As of August 2025, Air Marshall Islands operated 2 Cessna 408 SkyCourier and 2 Dornier 228.

Historically, according to the Official Airline Guide (OAG), Air Marshall Islands was operating a Douglas DC-8-62CF "Combi" jetliner as well as a Hawker Siddeley HS 748 turboprop aircraft supplied in 1982. The DC-8 Combi was operated in a mixed passenger/freight configuration and provided service linking Honolulu (HNL) with Kwajalein (KWA) and Majuro (MAJ) in competition with Continental Micronesia which was operating flights on the same routes with Boeing 727-200 aircraft at the time. Air Marshall Islands also operated a Saab 2000 high speed turboprop during the 1990s. In addition, GAF Nomad STOL capable turboprop aircraft were previously operated as well.

== See also ==
- List of airlines of the Marshall Islands
