= List of airports in the Federated States of Micronesia =

This is a list of airports in the Federated States of Micronesia, sorted by location.

The Federated States of Micronesia is an island nation located in the Pacific Ocean in the region known as Micronesia. The four states in the federation are: Chuuk, Kosrae, Pohnpei and Yap.

== Airports ==
Despite having four international airports, only three serve more than one external destination, and only two have destinations beyond Micronesia. Only one airport serves beyond Micronesia and Oceania.

Location	State	ICAO	IATA	Airport name
Chuuk	Chuuk	PTKK	TKK	Chuuk International Airport
Kosrae	Kosrae	PTSA	KSA	Kosrae International Airport (Caroline Islands Airport)
Pohnpei	Pohnpei	PTPN	PNI	Pohnpei International Airport
Ulithi	Yap	-	ULI	Ulithi Airport
Yap	Yap	PTYA	YAP	Yap International Airport

=== Minor airfields ===
Location	State	ICAO	IATA	Airport name
Fais	Yap	-	-	Fais Airfield
Houk (Pulusuk)	Chuuk	-	-	Houk Airfield
Kapingamarangi	Pohnpei	-	-	Kapingamarangi Airstrip
Mwoakilloa	Pohnpei	-	-	Mwoakilloa Airfield
Namonuito Atoll	Chuuk	-	-	Onoun Airfield
Pingelap	Pohnpei	-	-	Pingelap Airfield
Sapwuahfik	Pohnpei	-	-	Sapwuahfik Airfield
Ta	Chuuk	-	-	Mortlock Islands Airfield
Woleai	Yap	-	-	Woleai Airfield

== See also ==
- Transport in the Federated States of Micronesia
- List of airports by ICAO code: P#PT - Federated States of Micronesia, Palau
- Wikipedia: WikiProject Aviation/Airline destination lists: Oceania#Micronesia, Federated States of
