= Transportation in the Federated States of Micronesia =

Railways: 0 km

Highways: total: 388 kilometers (241 mi)

paved: 42 kilometers (26 mi)

unpaved: 198 kilometers (123 mi) (1996 est.)

Ports and harbors: Colonia (Yap), Kolonia (Pohnpei), Lele, Moen

Merchant marine: total: three ships (1,000 GT or over) 3,560 GT/2,060 tonnes deadweight (DWT) by type: cargo one, passenger/cargo two (2007)

Airports: Six (2007)

Airports - with paved runways:
total: Six
1,524 to 2,437 m: Four (Chuuk International Airport, Kosrae International Airport, Pohnpei International Airport and Yap International Airport)
914 to 1,523 m: Two (2007)

== See also ==
- Federated States of Micronesia
- List of airports in the Federated States of Micronesia
