= Combi aircraft =

Aircraft that can carry passengers and/or cargo

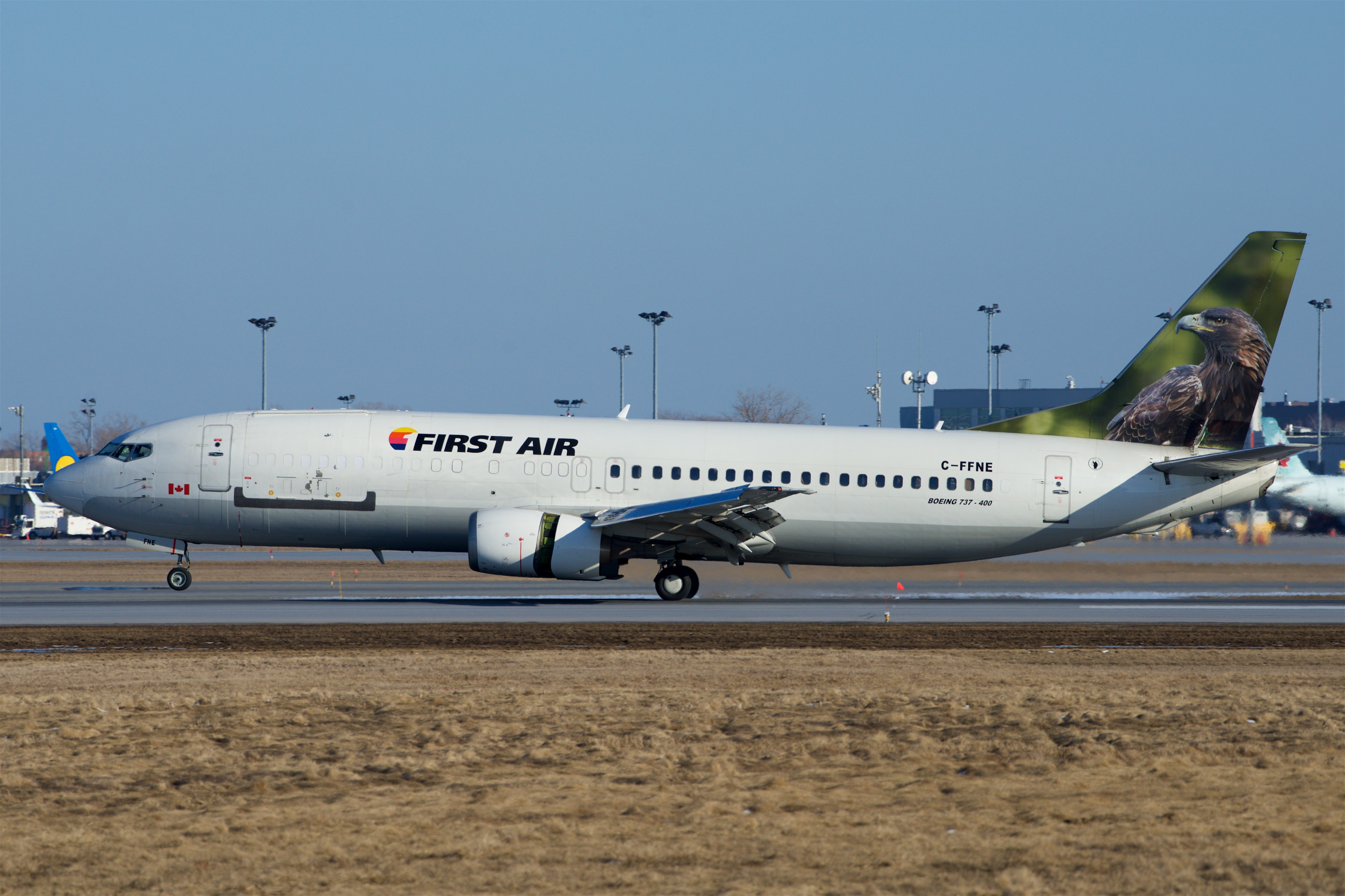
Boeing 737-400 combi aircraft of First Air with passenger windows behind the wing but not ahead

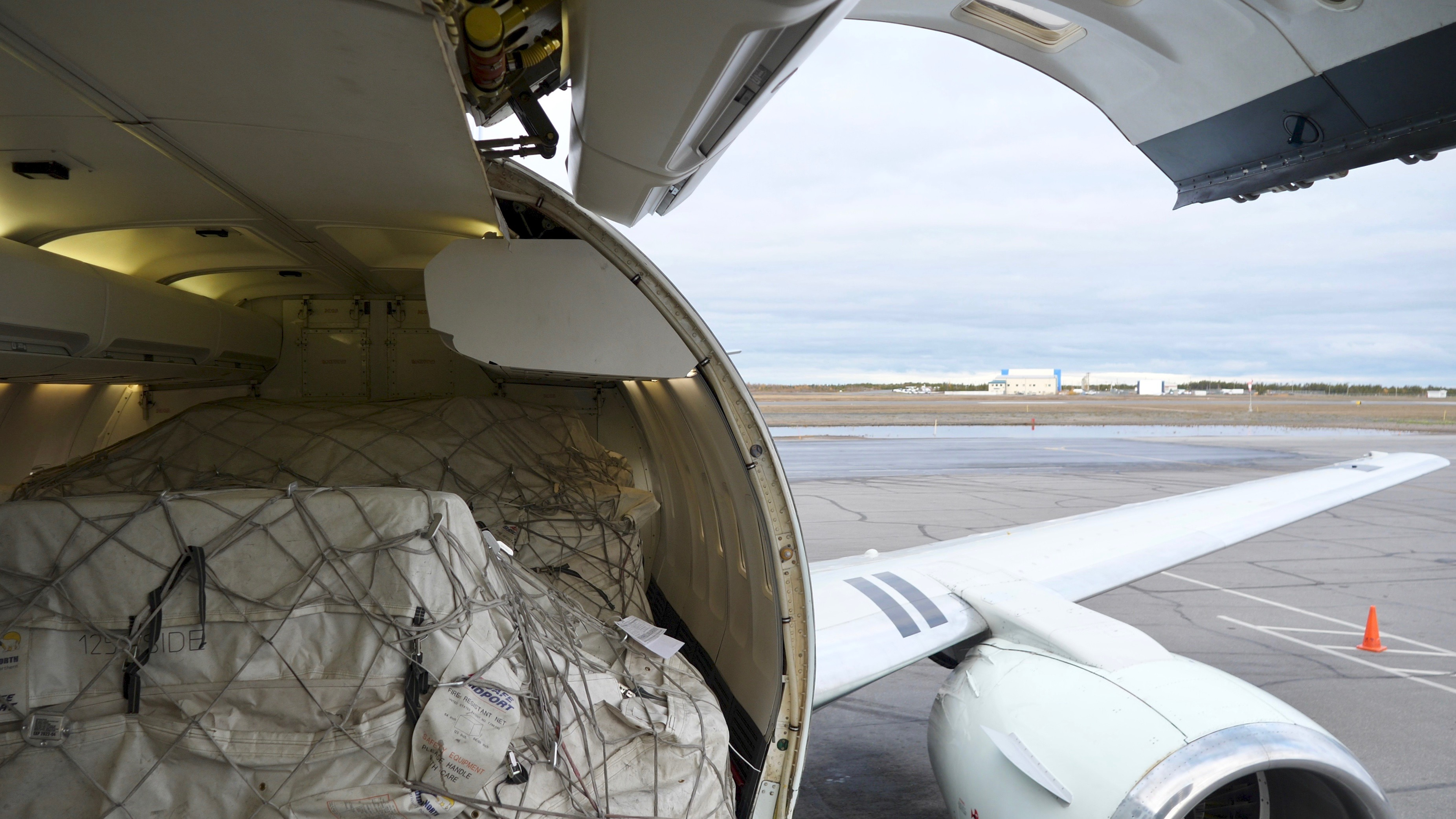
737-300 combi interior

Combi aircraft in commercial aviation are aircraft that can be used to carry either passengers as an airliner, or cargo as a freighter, and may have a partition in the aircraft cabin to allow both uses at the same time in a mixed passenger/freight combination. The name combi comes from the word combination. The concept originated in railroading with the combine car, a passenger car that contains a separate compartment for mail or baggage.

Combi aircraft typically feature an oversized cargo door, as well as tracks on the cabin floor to allow the seats to be added or removed quickly.

Typically, configured for both passenger and cargo duty, the passenger compartment is pressurized to a higher pressure, to prevent potential fumes from cargo entering the passenger area.

== Airlines ==
=== Northwest Airlines ===
In 1963, Northwest Airlines operated a domestic and international routing with a Douglas DC-7C four engine propeller aircraft between New York Idlewild Airport (which would subsequently be renamed JFK Airport) and Tokyo that was configured to transport a mixed passenger/cargo load.

The round trip routing for this flight which was operated once a week was New York-Chicago-Seattle-Anchorage-Tokyo.

The DC-7C was configured with all economy seating in the passenger cabin.

By 1966, Northwest was operating jet combi service with Boeing 707-320C aircraft between the U.S. and Asia.

=== Braniff International ===
In 1968, Braniff International was flying Boeing 727-100QC ("Quick Change") jetliners in a configuration that facilitated the transportation of palletized freight containers as well as 51 passengers in an all-economy-class cabin in scheduled airline operations.

According to a Braniff system timetable dated July 1, 1968, the airline was operating weekday "red eye flights" with round trip services at night with its B727 combi aircraft on the following routings: New York (JFK) - Washington, D.C. (IAD) - Nashville (BNA) - Memphis (MEM) - Dallas Love Field (DAL); Seattle (SEA) - Portland (PDX) - Dallas Love Field (DAL); and Denver (DEN) - Dallas Love Field (DAL).

The freight pallets were loaded in the front section of the aircraft by forklift via a large cargo door located on the side of the fuselage aft of the flight deck while passengers boarded and deplaned via the integral air stairs located at the rear underneath the trijet's engines.

These aircraft could also be quickly changed to fly either all cargo or all passenger operations and Braniff flew the B727QC in both configurations besides operating in a mixed passenger/freight combi mode.

=== Continental Micronesia ===
An additional U.S. operator of the Boeing 727-100 Combi was Continental Micronesia (known as "Air Mike") which in 1983 operated mixed passenger/freight flights with the aircraft between Honolulu and Guam on its "Island Hopper" service.

One such 727 combi service operated by Continental Micronesia was flight 562 which departed Guam every Tuesday at 3:30pm and then arrived in Honolulu at 7:41am the next morning with en route stops being made at such Pacific island destinations as Truk, Pohnpei (formerly Ponape), Kwajalein, Majuro and Johnston Island.

=== LAN-Chile ===
LAN-Chile (now LATAM Chile) was operating Boeing 727-100 combi service between the U.S. and Latin America three times a week in 1970 with service from New York City John F. Kennedy Airport (JFK) and Miami (MIA). According to its October 25, 1970 system timetable, 727 combi routings operated by LAN-Chile included New York JFK - Miami - Cali, Colombia - Guayaquil, Ecuador - Lima, Peru - Santiago, Chile - Buenos Aires, Argentina - Montevideo, Uruguay as well as New York JFK - Miami - Panama City, Panama - Cali, Colombia - Lima, Peru - Santiago, Chile - Buenos Aires, Argentina - Montevideo, Uruguay and New York JFK - Miami - Panama City, Panama - Guayaquil, Ecuador - Lima, Peru - Santiago, Chile - Buenos Aires, Argentina.

=== Royal Brunei Airlines ===
In 1983, Asian operator Royal Brunei Airlines operated nonstop combi service with the Boeing 737-200QC between its home base of Bandar Seri Begawan in Brunei and Bangkok, Hong Kong and Singapore.

=== KLM ===
KLM Royal Dutch Airlines was a long time combi user. According to the May 15, 1971 KLM system timetable, the airline operated Douglas DC-8 combi jetliners in mixed passenger/freight services between its hub located at the Amsterdam Schiphol Airport (AMS) and the following destinations: Amman, Anchorage, Bangkok, Brazzaville, Chicago O'Hare Airport, Houston Intercontinental Airport, Jakarta, Johannesburg, Kuala Lumpur, Mexico City, Montreal, New York City JFK Airport, Singapore, Tehran, Tokyo, Tripoli and Zürich. KLM's DC-8 combi aircraft featured all coach service with no first class cabin. The airline also operated Boeing 747 combi service for many years.

KLM retired its last 747-400M combi aircraft in 2020.

=== Air France and Lufthansa ===
Other European airlines operating combi aircraft in the past included Air France and Lufthansa which both operated Boeing 747 combis.

According to the Official Airline Guide (OAG), during the early 1980s Air France flew 747 combi service between France and destinations in Africa, Asia, Canada, Mexico, the Mideast, South America and the U.S. including Anchorage, Chicago O'Hare Airport, Houston Intercontinental Airport and Los Angeles while Lufthansa operated 747 combis between Germany and destinations in Africa, Asia, Australia, the Mideast, South America and the U.S. including Anchorage, Boston, Dallas/Fort Worth, Los Angeles, New York JFK Airport, Philadelphia, San Francisco and San Juan.

In both cases, Anchorage was used as a technical stop by the Air France and Lufthansa combi services on the polar route between Europe and Japan.

=== Other combi aircraft operators ===
A number of other airlines also flew Boeing 747 combis during the 1980s including Air Canada, Air Gabon, Air India (Boeing 747-300 combi version), Alitalia, Avianca, CAAC Airlines, Cameroon Airlines, China Airlines, El Al, Iberia Airlines, Iraqi Airways, Pakistan International Airlines, Qantas, Royal Jordanian Airlines, Sabena, Singapore Airlines, EVA AIR, South African Airways, Swissair, UTA and Varig. Air Canada also earlier operated Douglas DC-8 combi aircraft. In addition, Sabena was operating McDonnell Douglas DC-10-30 combis at this time as well. There was also a combi version of the successor to the DC-10 being the McDonnell Douglas MD-11C which was operated by Alitalia. Uganda Airlines operated Boeing 707 combi aircraft. During the early 1990s, Garuda Indonesia Airlines was operating Boeing 747 combis between Jakarta and Los Angeles via Honolulu. Alaska Airlines also flew the 737-400 combi on a multi-stop "milk run" route from Anchorage to Ketchikan to Wrangell to Petersburg to Seattle and then back to Anchorage as well as on other routes in Alaska.

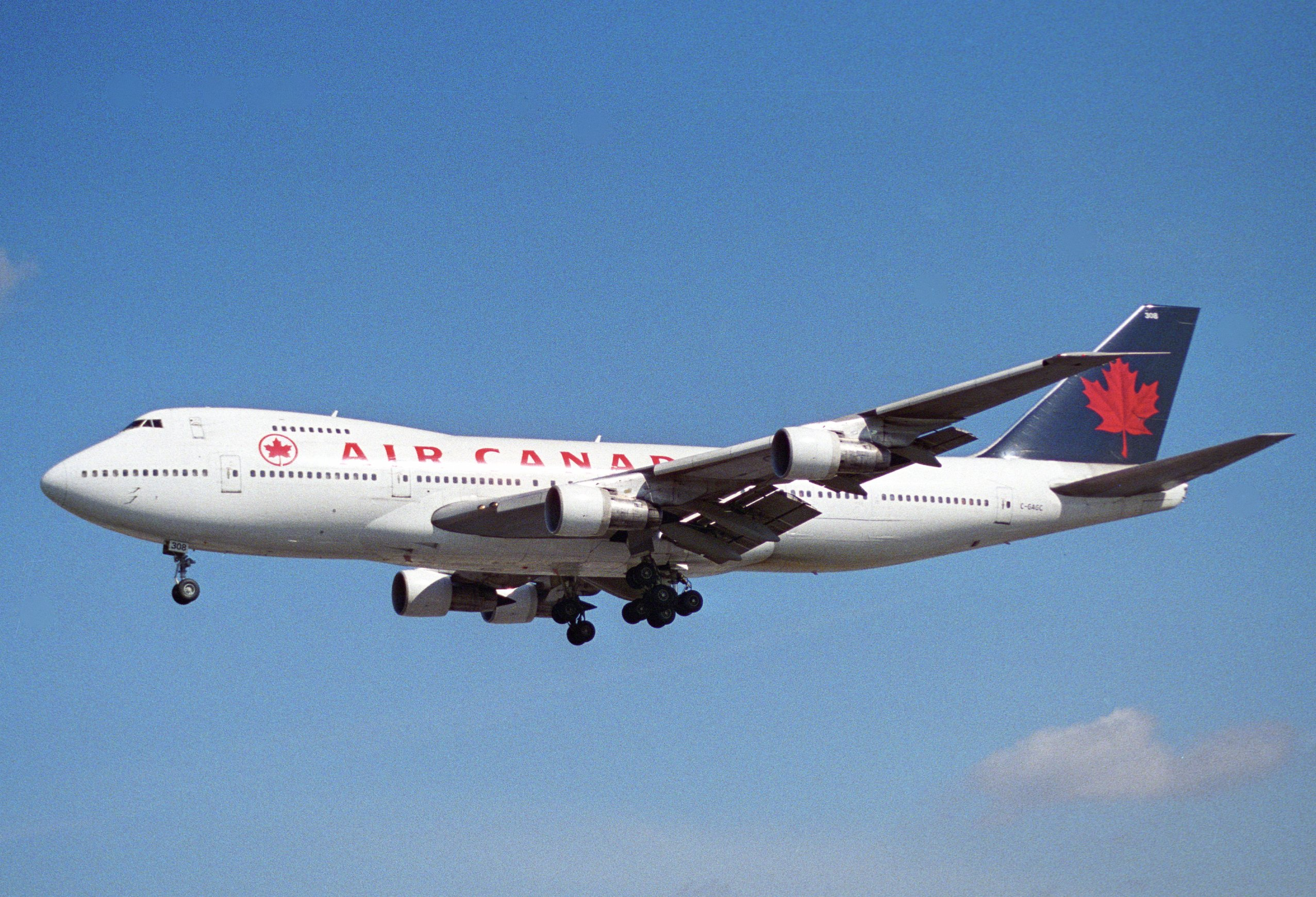
An Air Canada 747-200M combi aircraft.

Some now defunct airlines from embattled nations flew combi aircraft. Air Rhodesia had a Boeing 720 combi that it operated when Rhodesia was a nation, acquired in 1967 and flown till shortly after the dissolution of the nation and state airline. It was sold to South African Airways which because of the apartheid regime flew a number of combi aircraft. One of the most infamous of these flights was South African Airways Flight 295, a Boeing 747 combi named Helderberg. This was a scheduled commercial flight from Taiwan to South Africa that suffered a catastrophic in-flight fire in the cargo area and crashed into the Indian Ocean east of Mauritius on 28 November 1987, killing everyone on board. Air Vietnam (the official state airline of South Vietnam) possessed at least one Boeing 727-100 combi that it had obtained from Continental Air Services (CASI), a subsidiary airline of Continental Airlines set up to provide operations and airlift support in Southeast Asia, in the mid-1960s. Under this agreement, CASI would share passengers and cargo routes with Air Vietnam on certain domestic and international routes. During the Fall of Saigon it was destroyed during shelling of Tan Son Nhat International Airport.

Two airlines based in Iceland also operated combi aircraft: Icelandair flying Boeing 727-100 and Boeing 737-200 combis, and Eagle Air (Iceland) flying Boeing 737-200 combis. Both air carriers operated their Boeing combi jets on flights between Iceland and western Europe.

Air Marshall Islands was a somewhat exotic combi aircraft operator flying a Douglas DC-8-62CF jetliner in mixed passenger/freight operations. According to the Official Airline Guide (OAG), Air Marshall Islands was operating a DC-8 combi on scheduled services linking Honolulu with the Pacific islands of Kwajalein and Majuro during the early 1990s. Air Marshall Islands is still currently in existence flying regional turboprops but no longer operates combi jet aircraft.

Alaska Airlines was a long time combi operator flying various Boeing jet models in combi configuration (see below). There were several other combi aircraft operators as well in Alaska in the past including MarkAir with Boeing 737-200s and de Havilland Canada DHC-7 Dash 7s, Reeve Aleutian Airways with Boeing 727-100 jets and Lockheed L-188 Electra turboprops, Western Airlines with Lockheed L-188 Electras and Wien Air Alaska with Boeing 737-200s and Fairchild F-27B turboprops. Wien was the launch customer for the combi version of the B737-200 while Wien predecessor Northern Consolidated Airlines was the first operator of the Fairchild F-27B which was combi version of the Fairchild Hiller FH-227.

A number of airlines in Canada also flew combi aircraft besides Air Canada and its Douglas DC-8 and Boeing 747 combi services including First Air with Boeing 727-100 and 727-200 jetliners in addition to Hawker Siddeley HS 748 turboprops. First Air continues to operate combi aircraft at the present time including Boeing 737-200 and 737-400 jetliners as well as the ATR 42 turboprop. Two other current combi operators in Canada are Air North operating the Boeing 737-200 jet and Hawker Siddeley HS 748 turboprop, and Canadian North flying Boeing 737-200 jets and de Havilland Canada DHC-8-100 Dash 8 turboprop aircraft. Other combi operators in Canada in the past included CP Air and Pacific Western with both airlines flying Boeing 727-100 and Boeing 737-200 combi aircraft as well as Nordair operating Boeing 737-200 combi aircraft.

In 2008 Aviation Traders designed a Boeing 757-200 combi aircraft leased from Astraeus Airlines for the heavy metal band Iron Maiden. The front of the aircraft was configured for passengers, with the rear holding six tonnes of cargo consisting of Iron Maiden's equipment for their tour.

=== Alaska Airlines combi service ===
Alaska Airlines operated converted narrow body Boeing 737-400 combis that were previously flown in full passenger configuration. According to the Alaska Airlines website, the airline was operating several Boeing 737-400 combi aircraft with each jetliner configured with 72 passenger seats in the coach compartment. The airline then announced the retirement of these aircraft with the last combi flight scheduled for October 18, 2017. On that date, Alaska Airlines flight 66 was the airline's last scheduled combi flight with the Boeing 737-400 (N764AS) operating a routing of Anchorage (ANC) - Cordova (CDV) - Yakutat (YAK) - Juneau (JNU) - Seattle (SEA).

The 737-400 aircraft replaced Boeing 737-200 combis that were formerly operated by Alaska Airlines, which was the only major U.S. air carrier still flying scheduled combi operations domestically with service between Seattle and Alaska and also between Anchorage, Fairbanks and remote destinations in Alaska.

Alaska Airlines previously operated Boeing 727-100C aircraft which were also capable of combi operations and has now added Boeing 737-700 freighter all-cargo aircraft to its fleet which have replaced its Boeing 737-400 combi aircraft.

== Notable combi passenger aircraft ==
- ATR 42-300
- Boeing 707-320C
- Boeing 720
- Boeing 727-100C (including the B727-100QC "Quick Change" model)
- Boeing 727-200 (formerly operated by First Air in Canada)
- Boeing 737-200C (including the B737-200QC "Quick Change" model)
- Boeing 737-300C
- Boeing 737-400C
- Boeing 737-700C
- Boeing 737-800C (operated by Air Inuit in Canada)
- Boeing 747-200M
- Boeing 747-200C (can be converted between passenger, cargo and combi configurations)
- Boeing 747-300M
- Boeing 747-400M
- Boeing 757-200M (only one aircraft was ever built, 9N-ACB; formerly operated by Nepal Airlines)
- British Aircraft Corporation BAC One-Eleven
- Cessna 408 SkyCourier (offered with quick-release seats or a partitioned cabin)
- Convair CV-240
- de Havilland Canada DHC-7 Dash 7
- de Havilland Canada DHC-8-100 and Q400 Dash 8
- Douglas DC-7C
- Douglas DC-8CF
- Douglas DC-9 (DC-9-15MC had removable folding seats; -15RC and -33RC had seats mounted on pallets)
- Fairchild F-27B
- Hawker Siddeley HS 748
- Lockheed L-188 Electra
- McDonnell Douglas DC-10-30 Combi
- McDonnell Douglas MD-11 Combi

== See also ==
- Preighter
- Bruck
- Combine car
