= Ulithi Airport =

Airport in Yap State, the Federated States of Micronesia

Ulithi Civil Airfield
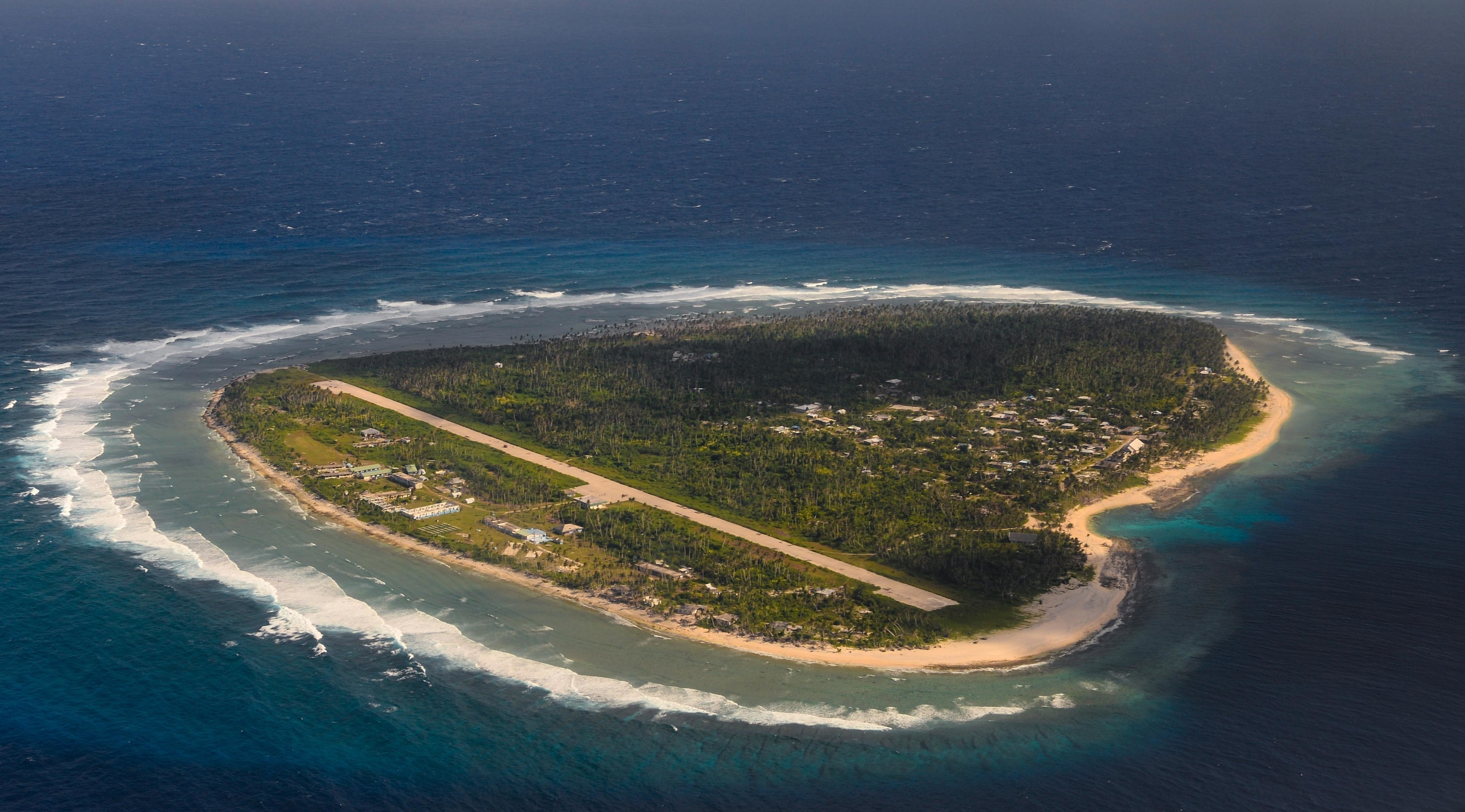
- Aerial view of Ulithi Airfield, 2015
- IATA: ULI; ICAO: PTYU; FAA LID: TT02

Summary
- Airport type: Public
- Serves: Falalop
- Location: Falalop Island, Ulithi Atoll, Yap State, Federated States of Micronesia
- Elevation AMSL: 6 ft (1.8 m)
- Coordinates: 10°1′39″N 139°47′20″E

Map
- Location of the airport in Federated States of Micronesia

Runways
Direction	Length		Surface
Direction	m	ft	Surface
09/27	914	3,000	Concrete
- Source: Division of Civil Aviation

Ulithi Civil Airfield (IATA: ULI, ICAO: PTYU, FAA LID: TT02) is a public airport serving the island of Falalop, located in the Ulithi Atoll in the Caroline Islands, Federated States of Micronesia. It was previously Falalop Airfield or Naval Air Base Ulithi (NAB Ulithi), when used as a World War II airfield.

== History ==
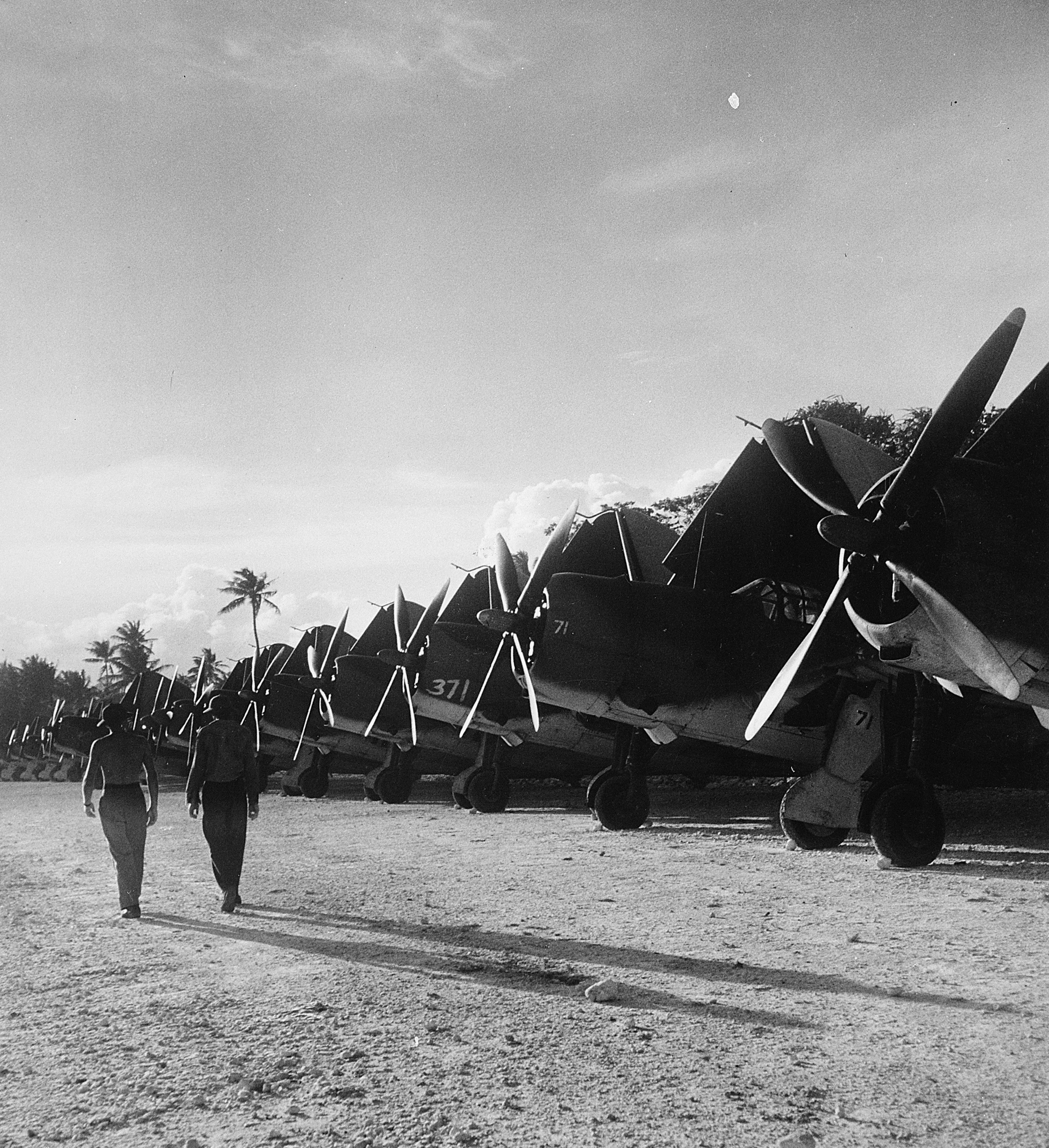
Marines walk past a flight line of SB2Cs on Falalop, December 1944

The Japanese had built an airstrip on Falalop. Ulithi Atoll was captured unopposed on 20 September 1944. On 8 October the 51st Naval Construction Battalion began to improve the former Japanese airfield on Falalop, creating a coral-surfaced 3,500 feet (1,100 m) by 150 feet (46 m) runway, six taxiways, hardstands, lighting, a traffic-control tower, operations buildings, tank farm and a seaplane ramp. The airfield was fully operational by 1 December 1944.

Marine Air Group 45 (MAG-45) deployed to Falalop in late September to establish base operations.

Units stationed at Falalop included VMD-354 operating photo-reconnaissance F4Us, VMF(N)-542 operating F6F-3N night-fighters and Air Warning Squadron 2 (AWS-2) providing early warning and ground controlled intercept.

Fleet Air Wing One (FAW-1) was based at Falalop from 15 October until 30 December 1944 when it was relocated to Saipan.

On 7 December 1944 a detachment of two PBYs of VPB-23 was deployed to Falalop for air-sea rescue missions. A further three aircraft were deployed on 20 June 1945. All VPB-23 aircraft were transferred to Tanapag Harbor on Saipan on 13 December 1945. It was expanded and resurfaced, the runway running the full width of the island. The east end of the strip was extended approximately twenty feet past the natural shoreline. A number of small strips for light aircraft were built on several of the smaller islands.

== Airlines and destinations ==
Airlines	Destinations
Caroline Islands Air	Charter: Chuuk, Yap
Pacific Mission Aviation	Fais, Yap
