= Milk run =

Transportation route or easy military mission

A milk run, milk round, or milk route is the fixed route taken to pick up milk from dairy farmers, or to deliver milk to consumers, as part of a milk delivery system. In extended usage, it may be a transportation service that has many stops. Metaphorically, it may be a slow or tedious trip, a military air mission posing little danger, or any circular route.

== Dairy use ==
Milk runs are documented in the American Upper Midwest as early as 1917, where it was a train that made frequent stops to pick up farmers' milk cans for shipment to local dairies for processing and bottling.

It may also be the route used to distribute full milk bottles and collect empties by a milkman. The route may be sold by one milkman to another.

== Transportation ==
In scheduled passenger airline or rail travel, a milk run may involve a trip with many stops, and more generally a slow, tedious trip. It may also be an uneventful trip.

== Military ==
Originally from United States Army Air Corps and Royal Air Force aircrews in World War II, a milk run was typically used to refer as a mission posing little danger, the mission could be either a bombing run or a convoy on secured routes (i.e Highway 1 in Vietnam).

== Commercial aviation ==
In the airline industry, a "milk run" is a multi-stop, regularly scheduled passenger flight operated with a single aircraft. Current examples include:

- Several Alaska Airlines routes connecting smaller Alaskan cities to Juneau, Anchorage, Fairbanks and Seattle.
- The Rex Airlines Milk Run in Queensland, Australia.
- United Airlines tri-weekly Island Hopper service from Honolulu to Guam via Chuuk, Kosrae, Pohnpei, Kwajalein and Majuro.
- The Air France bi-weekly Milk Run to Pointe a Pitre, Fort-de-France, and Cayenne from Miami.

An historical example of a transcontinental airline milk run in the U.S. in 1962 was National Airlines (1934-1980) flight 223 operated daily with a Lockheed L-188 Electra turboprop aircraft on a south and then westbound routing of Boston - New York City - Jacksonville, FL - Orlando - Tampa - New Orleans - Houston - Las Vegas - San Francisco. According to the March 2, 1962 National Airlines system timetable, flight 223 departed Boston at 7:30 am and then arrived in San Francisco at 8:42 pm on the same day with seven intermediate stops en route.

== Logistics ==
In logistics, a milk run is a circular route.
