= VMP-354 =

Marine Photographic Squadron 354
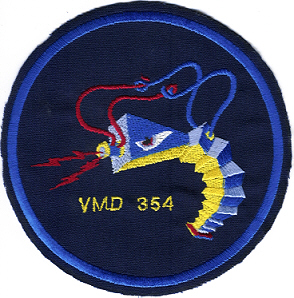
- VMD-354 Insignia during WWII
- Active: 1 Jul 1943 – 8 Dec 1949
- Country: United States
- Branch: United States Marine Corps
- Type: Aerial Reconnaissance
- Part of: N/A
- Tail Code: LV

Aircraft flown
- Reconnaissance: F6F-3P Hellcat; Grumman F7F Tigercat

Marine Photographic Squadron 354 (VMP-354) was a United States Marine Corps photographic reconnaissance squadron originally commissioned during World War II. During the war, the squadron flew the F6F-3P Hellcat and later transitioned to the Grumman F7F Tigercat. VMP-354 was decommissioned on 8 December 1949. Since that date, no other Marine Corps squadron has carried the lineage and honors of VMP-354.

== History ==
=== World War II ===
Marine Photographic Squadron 354 (VMD-354) was commissioned on 1 July 1943, at Marine Corps Air Station Cherry Point, North Carolina. Initial training by squadron pilots took place in PBY4-1s and B-24s. In February 1944, VMP-354 received its first F6F-3P aircraft but still continued to fly the PBYs. During the squadron's initial training in North Carolina it experimented with nighttime photography using magnesium flares dropped with parachutes. In September 1944, the PBYs were transferred to the US Navy and the B-24s were phased out leaving only the Hellcats.

In July 1944, the squadron was moved to Marine Corps Outlying Field Greenville to continue its training. The squadron departed MCAS Cherry Point on 12 April 1945, arriving at MCAD Miramar in late April 1945.

Departing San Diego in May 1945, the majority of the squadron arrived at Agana Airfield on Guam in June 1945. While headquartered in Guam, the squadron also operated detachments from Peleliu, Ulithi Airport, Falalop, and Okinawa. During the last few months of the war, the squadron was also tasked with photographing southern Japan in preparation for the planned invasion of Japan. Squadron aircraft based at Yontan Airfield flew these six-hour round trip missions mainly to photograph beaches in Kyushu.

=== Post-war operations ===
The squadron returned to MCAS Cherry Point in November 1945 and remained in an almost cadre status until 6 December 1945, when it was redesignated as VMP-354. In 1947 VMP-354 pilots transitioned to the F7F-3P Tigercat. VMP-354 was decommissioned in December 1949 as part of the continued downsizing of Marine Aviation after World War II due to tightening defense budgets.

== Unit awards ==
A unit citation or commendation is an award bestowed upon an organization for the action cited. Members of the unit who participated in said actions are allowed to wear on their uniforms the awarded unit citation. VMP-354 has been presented with the following awards:

Streamer	Award	Year(s)	Additional Info
	World War II Victory Streamer	1941–1945	Pacific War

== See also ==
- United States Marine Corps Aviation
- List of active United States Marine Corps aircraft squadrons
- List of decommissioned United States Marine Corps aircraft squadrons
