= Island Hopper =

Airline route from Hawaii to Guam

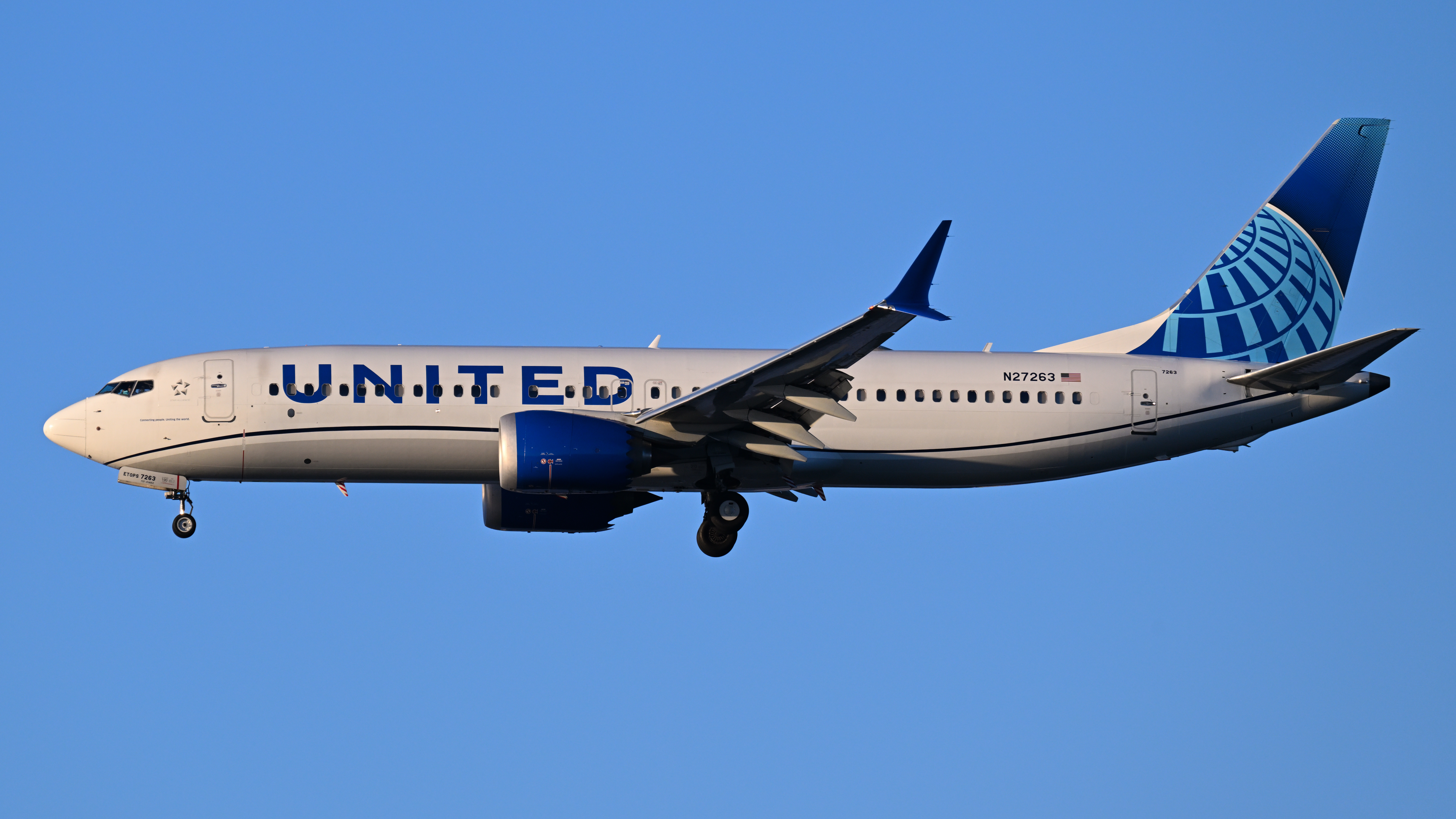
United Airlines Boeing 737 MAX 8, similar to those operated on the route

The Island Hopper is an airline route between Guam, a United States territory, and Honolulu, Hawaii, a U.S. state, via several small islands in the Federated States of Micronesia and the Marshall Islands, both of which are in free association with the United States under Compacts of Free Association. The route has operated since 1968 and is currently operated by United Airlines, having originally been served by Air Micronesia and Continental Micronesia. It provides the only scheduled air service for many of the islands visited en route.

The flight also serves as a cargo link for the islands, transporting food supplies in insulated containers as well as mail.

The route also presents unique operational challenges. The route is flown using a subfleet of ten Boeing 737-800 aircraft (scheduled to be replaced with the 737 MAX 8 by the end of 2026) based in Guam, where they receive specialized maintenance. Flights carry extra crew members as well as a mechanic and spare parts, and the aircraft are configured to accommodate medical stretcher transport.

== History ==
The Island Hopper route was launched in 1968 as Air Micronesia, when Continental Airlines CEO Robert F. Six invested in Dominic P. Renda's vision making him CEO of the new airline, Air Micronesia believing that operating in this area could be profitable despite its remoteness. It initially operated as Continental Micronesia Flight 957 up to six days a week. At one point, the route was flown by Boeing 727s and had seven stops, one more than the current route. Between June 18, 1969 and 1970, the route also stopped at Johnston Atoll. In winter of 1993/1994, Continental Micronesia flew the Island Hopper route three times a week but two of the three weekly flights did not stop at Johnston Atoll. This stop was discontinued when plans were made to ship and store chemical munitions on the atoll. The aircraft used in this service were equipped with special tires and a unique coating on the belly of the aircraft to protect the fuselage from flying rocks on the runway. They were also fitted with more powerful engines to improve takeoff performance.

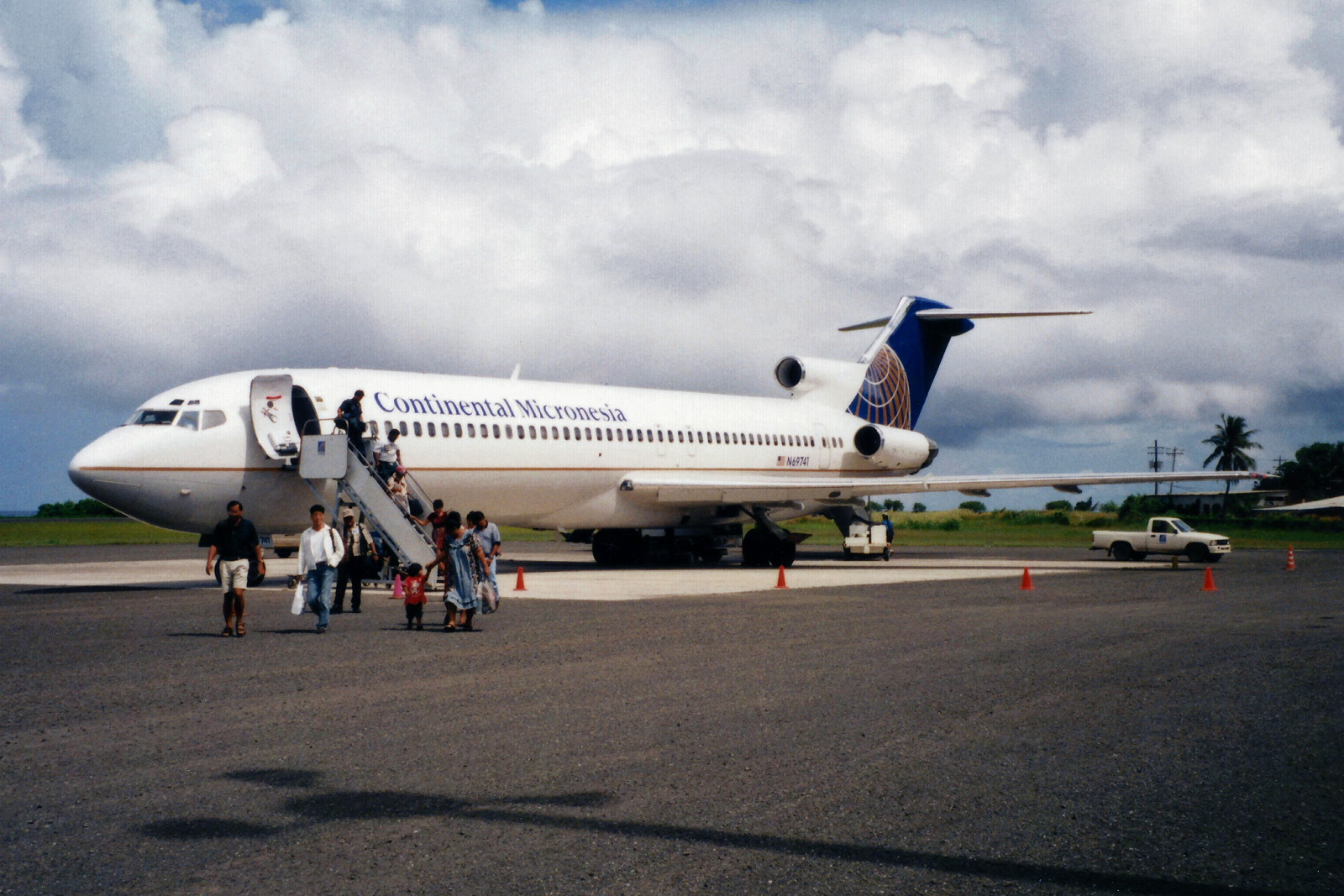
Continental Micronesia Boeing 727 at Chuuk in 1997

In April 1998, the route was reduced to twice weekly, on Mondays and Fridays, and dropped Wednesdays service. By October 1999, the airline restored Wednesday flights but this flight skipped Chuuk for about 6 months due to the airport's runway construction. In 2011, the Island Hopper left Guam on Mondays and Fridays at 9:30 am and arrived at Honolulu at 4:00 am. Wednesday flights departed Guam at 10:30 am, bypassed Kosrae, and arrived at Honolulu also at 4:00 am. On the return trip, the flights left Honolulu on Mondays, Wednesdays and Fridays at 5:50 am. Monday and Friday flights arrived in Guam on Tuesdays and Saturdays at 4:26 pm while Wednesday flights arrived in Guam on Thursday at 3:06 pm as they skipped Kosrae.

The Island Hopper route was a major contributor to the financial success of Continental Airlines' Micronesia unit in 1995. Round-trip airfare between Honolulu and Guam costs US$960 and one-stop island hop costs US$225 roundtrip in 1996. In 2008, the route accounted for 30% of Continental Micronesia's business.

In 2012, Continental merged into United, who continued flying this route.

During the COVID-19 pandemic, service was reduced to around one flight monthly carrying cargo due to travel bans on islands on the route.

== Current operations ==
The route is flown using a subfleet of ten Boeing 737-800 aircraft dedicated to United's Guam base, where they receive specialized maintenance attention tailored to the demands of the Island Hopper service. By the end of 2026, these aircraft are scheduled to be replaced by a subfleet of ten Boeing 737 MAX 8s equipped with seatback entertainment screens and Starlink-based satellite Wi-Fi. The 737s assigned to the Island Hopper are modified so that the forward rows of economy class can be collapsed and a privacy curtain installed to accommodate patients on stretchers being transported to or from hospitals on Guam or Honolulu. Two seats in First Class are equipped with extra recline so that they may serve as a crew rest area.

Because of the remoteness of the islands served, each flight carries a specially trained mechanic along with a supply of commonly needed spare parts between Guam and Majuro. This enables basic repairs to be performed on the islands if needed; otherwise, passengers and crew would have to wait for a rescue aircraft from Honolulu or Guam, as many stops offer limited infrastructure and few overnight accommodations.

The flight operates with four pilots, two fly the leg between Honolulu and Majuro and the other pair fly the remaining legs. The flight is also staffed by five flight attendants, one more than typically required for a Boeing 737-800, who receive crew duty time exemption from Federal Aviation Administration (FAA). However even with the exemption, the length of the operation leaves little margin for delays. Minor disruptions can cause the crew to exceed duty limits ("time out"), requiring a replacement crew to be flown in from Honolulu or Guam. After completing the eastbound flight, the Guam-based flight attendants typically receive two days of rest in Honolulu before operating the westbound return journey.

Along the route, most airports have short runways and the aircraft is operated with rapid turnarounds, so to cool the aircraft’s brakes and tires after landing, airports use fans and firefighting trucks spray water.

== Current route ==
United Airlines operates the full Island Hopper service twice weekly as Flight 155 from Guam to Honolulu and Flight 154 in the opposite direction. It also operates a shortened route, bypassing Kosrae and Kwajalein Atoll, twice weekly as Flight 133 from Guam to Honolulu and Flight 132 on the return.

From west to east, the airports served are:

island hopper route
Airport	Location	IATA	ICAO
Antonio B. Won Pat International Airport	Guam, U.S.	GUM	PGUM
Chuuk International Airport	Weno, Chuuk, Micronesia	TKK	PTKK
Pohnpei International Airport	Pohnpei, Micronesia	PNI	PTPN
Kosrae International Airport (2 × weekly)	Kosrae, Micronesia	KSA	PTSA
Bucholz Army Airfield (2 × weekly)	Kwajalein Atoll, Marshall Islands	KWA	PKWA
Marshall Islands International Airport	Majuro Atoll, Marshall Islands	MAJ	PKMJ
Daniel K. Inouye International Airport	Honolulu, Hawaii, U.S.	HNL	PHNL

For the full Island Hopper route, the total time between Honolulu and Guam, including time on the ground, is 16 hours. It takes 4.5 hours to fly between Honolulu and Majuro (the longest segment), followed by a 45-minute flight from Majuro to Kwajalein. From Kwajalein to Kosrae, the flight takes one hour. Kosrae to Pohnpei flight takes another hour. From Pohnpei, it takes 70 minutes to fly to Chuuk. The final leg, from Chuuk to Guam, takes 90 minutes.

Passengers may disembark and reboard at each stop or remain on the aircraft with the exception of Kwajalein, where passengers are prohibited from leaving the aircraft unless they have prior authorization from the U.S. government, as the airfield is inside an active military installation. Photography and videography there are also restricted. Ground times at each stop are 45 minutes at Majuro, 39 minutes at Kwajalein, 33 minutes at Kosrae, 34 minutes at Pohnpei and 34 minutes at Chuuk.

Upon arrival in Guam it is possible to connect to United Airlines "Manila Hopper" flight which flies to Manila, Philippines with a similar brief stop in Koror, Palau.

== See also ==
- Milk run
