= Kosrae International Airport =

Airport in Okat, the Federated States of Micronesia

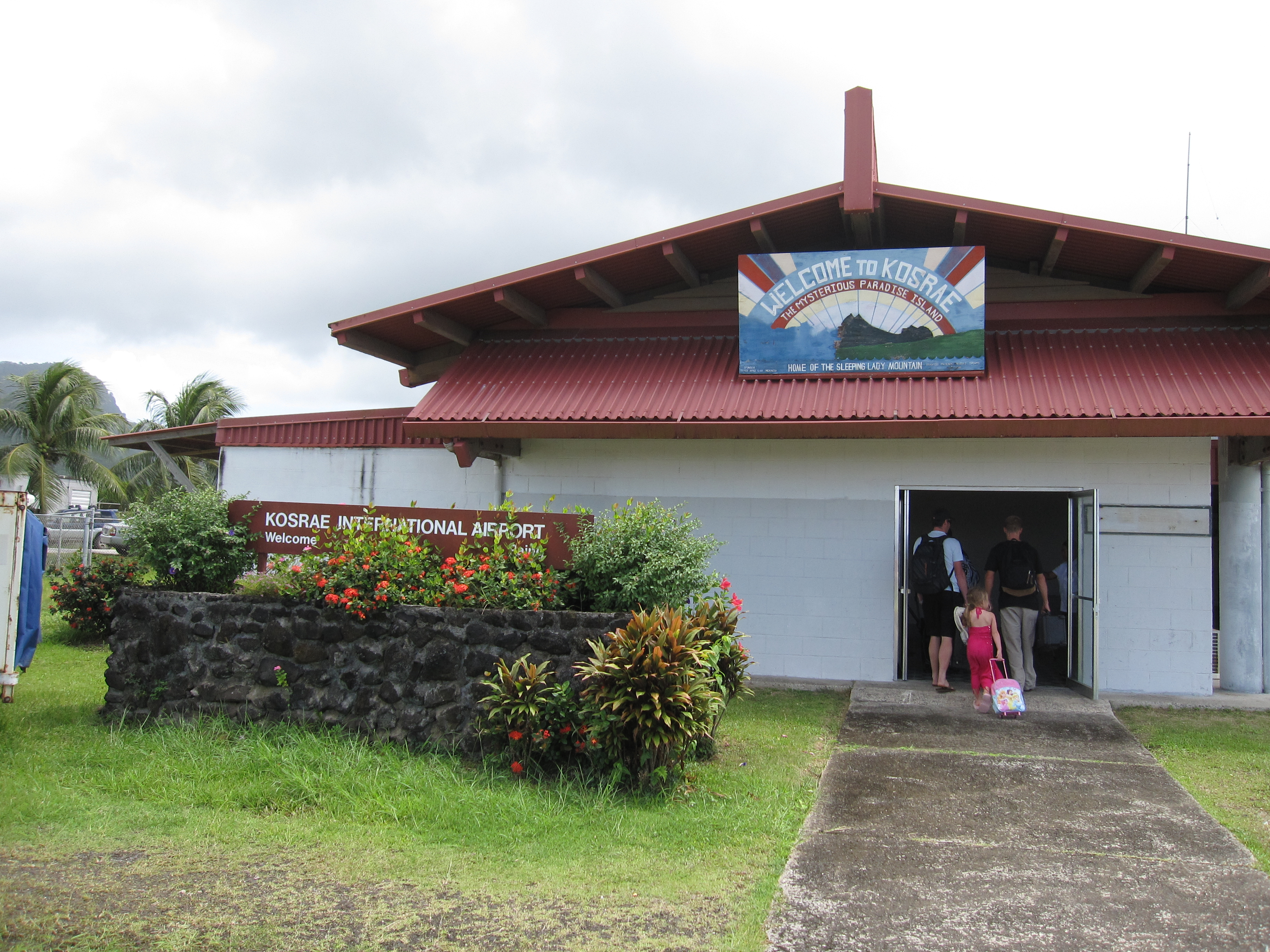
- IATA: KSA; ICAO: PTSA; FAA LID: TTK

Summary
- Airport type: Public
- Location: Okat
- Elevation AMSL: 11 ft / 3 m
- Coordinates: 05°21′25″N 162°57′30″E

Map

Runways
Direction	Length		Surface
Direction	ft	m	Surface
05/23	5,750	1,753	Asphalt

Kosrae International Airport (IATA: KSA, ICAO: PTSA, FAA LID: TTK) is an airport serving Kosrae, the easternmost state of the Federated States of Micronesia. It is located on an artificial island within the fringing reef about 150 meters from the coast and is connected to the main island by a causeway.

The airport has been continuously served by the United Airlines (formerly Continental Micronesia) Island Hopper service between Guam and Honolulu, which stops twice weekly at Kosrae in each direction. Kosrae is three jogs from both Guam and Honolulu.

== Airlines and destinations ==
Airlines	Destinations
Caroline Islands Air	Charter: Pohnpei
United Airlines	Chuuk, Guam, Honolulu, Kwajalein, Majuro, Pohnpei

== See also ==
- Island Hopper scheduled air service
