= Yap International Airport =

International airport on Yap, the Federated States of Micronesia

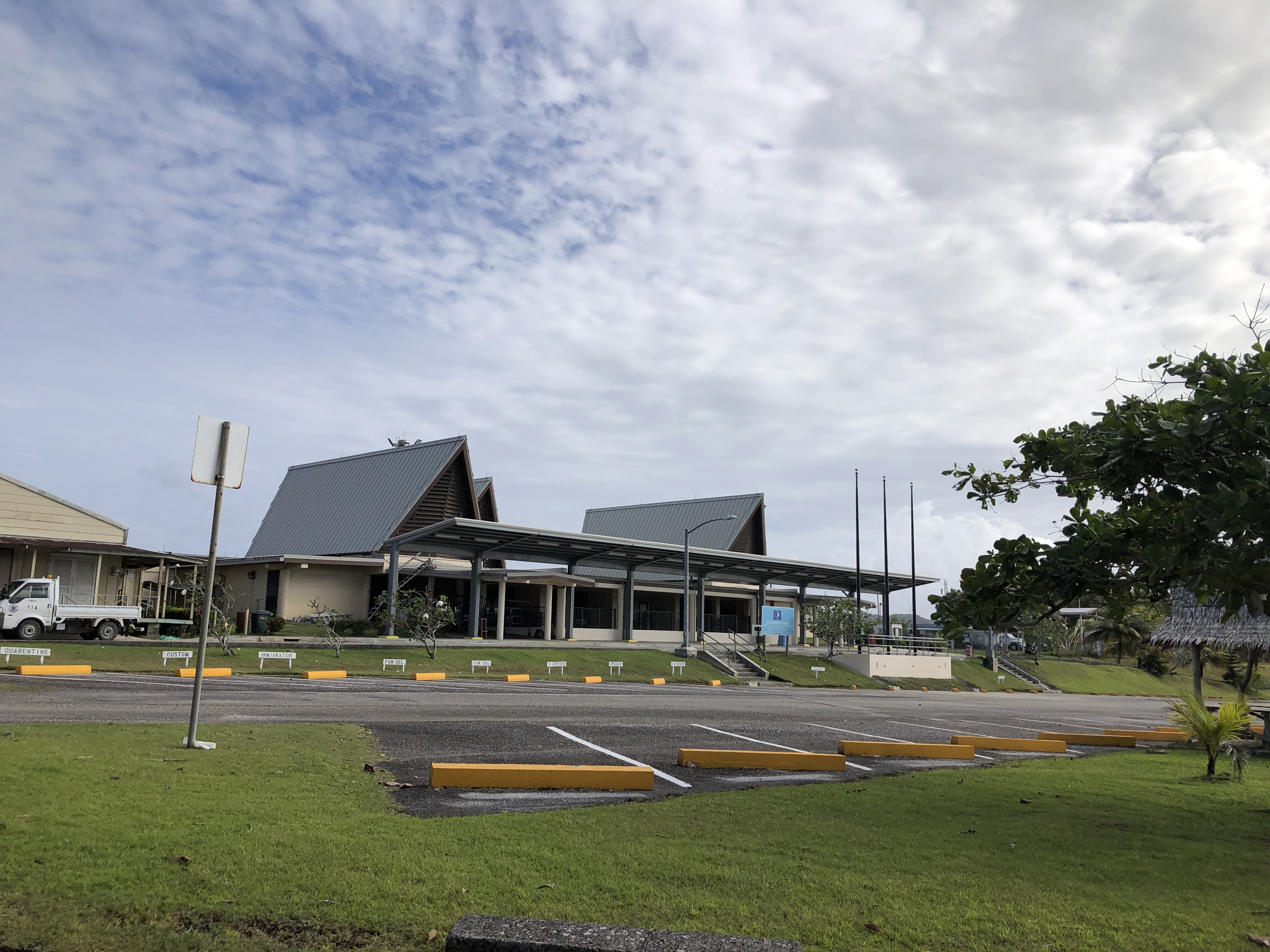
- IATA: YAP; ICAO: PTYA; FAA LID: T11

Summary
- Airport type: Public
- Operator: Civil government
- Location: Yap
- Elevation AMSL: 91 ft (28 m)
- Coordinates: 09°29′56″N 138°04′57″E
- Website: http://www.ict.fm/civilaviation/yap.html

Map
- Location within Federated States of Micronesia

Runways
Direction	Length		Surface
Direction	ft	m	Surface
07/25	6,000	1,829	Asphalt

Yap International Airport (IATA: YAP, ICAO: PTYA, FAA LID: T11) is an airport on Colonia, the main island of the State of Yap in the Federated States of Micronesia. The airport is serviced by United Airlines from Guam. Pacific Missionary Aviation makes periodic trips to the outer island airfields of Ulithi Atoll, Fais Island, and Woleai Atoll.

== History ==
Yap International Airport was completed on the island of Waqaab (Yap) and opened in 1988 and currently serves as the only operational airport on Yap Proper.

The former (old) Yap Airport was originally built by the Japanese in WWII as Yap Airfield, being completed in May 1944.

On April 1, 1944, US Navy aircraft from Task Force 58 sighted Colonia and bombed it. This raid was conducted at the same as air raids were being conducted on the Palau Islands. There were however no aircraft based yet as the 26th Air Flotilla were to based at Colonia after it was completed. In May, there still were no aircraft based. On May 3, the IJN issued Combined Fleet Operations Order No.76, effectively calling for the 265 Kokutai (Air Group), which mainly had Model 21 Zeros and 523 Kokutai with D4Ys to rebase themselves at Yap before the last ten days of May. As part of this, 261 and 263 Kokutai as well as the Kokutai 321 which had night fighters would designate Yap as a dispersal base for them. On May 16, the 202nd and 503rd Kokutai were rebased at Yap. Towards the end of May, half of the Judys from the 523rd were ordered to Colonia.

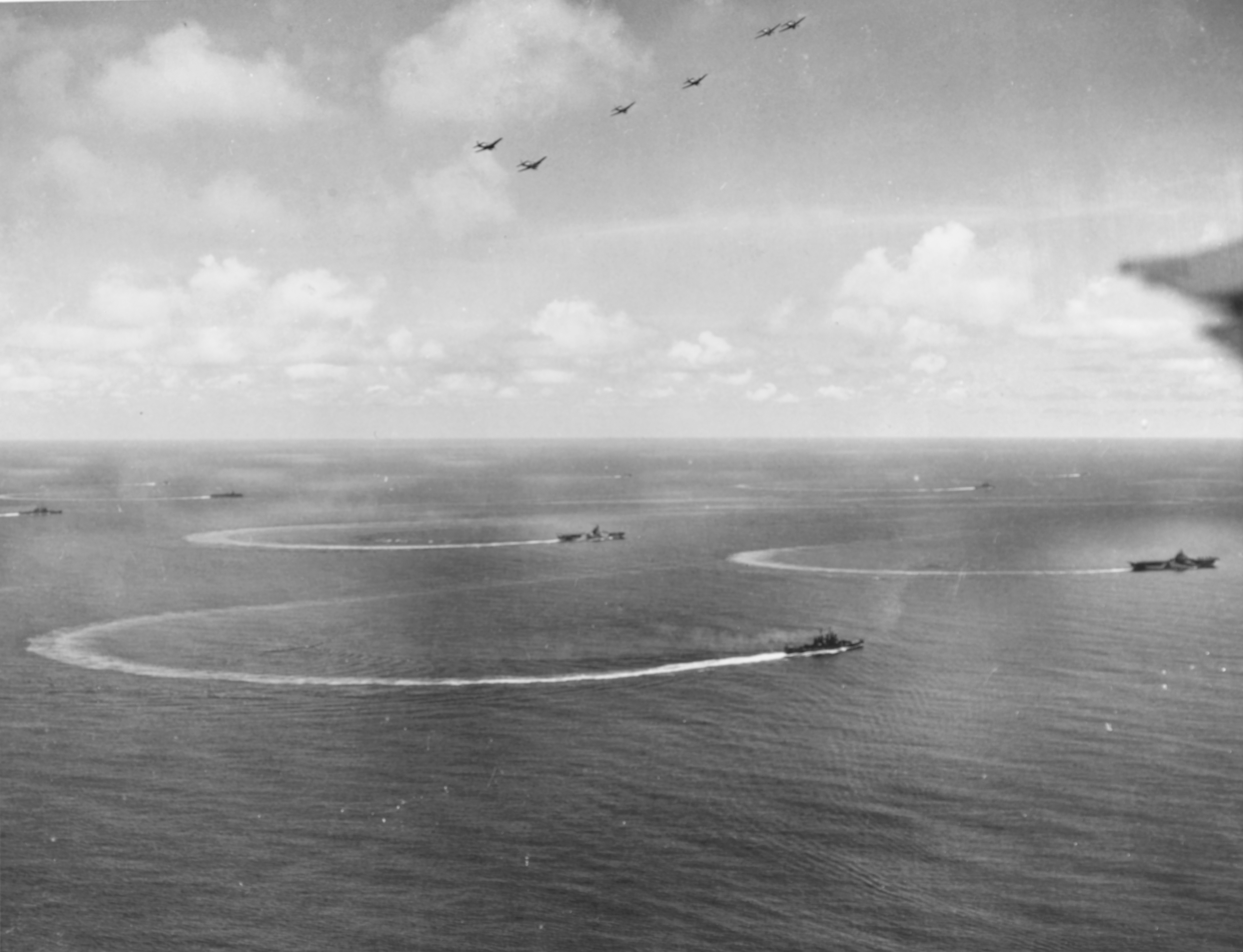
Task Group 58.1 reverses course, during attacks on Yap, 28 July 1944.

A few days after an air raid on the Marinas from US Navy aircraft on the 11th of June, they attacked Colonia. As part of the Battle of the Philippine Sea, aircraft from Colonia conducted strikes against the US Carriers. On the 17th, an airstrike of 31 Zeros, 17 Judys and 2 P1Y Frances aircraft were sent to attack ships at the Charan Kanoa area. They damaged LST-84 and despite 44 FM-2 Wildcats in the air, they scored a bomb hit on the escort carrier, USS Fanshaw Bay CVE-70, causing serious damage and killing several onboard.

Yap was repeatedly attacked from April 1 on until August 10, 1944 when it was deemed neutralized. After August 2, the remaining 8 usable aircraft were sent to Palau.

Units of the IJNAS based at Yap included the:

- 202 Kokutai – A6M Zero (Late May 1944 – July 1944) – Disbanded
- 261 Kokutai – A6M Zero (Late May 1944 – July 1944) – Disbanded
- 265 Kokutai – A6M Zero (Mid June 1944 – July 1944) – Disbanded
- 523 Kokutai – D4Y Judy (Late May 1944 – July 1944) – Disbanded
- 201 Kokutai Buntai S306 (Formed from the survivors of the 263 and 343 Kokutai) July 16, 1944 – August 2, 1944 – Disbanded

== Airlines and destinations ==
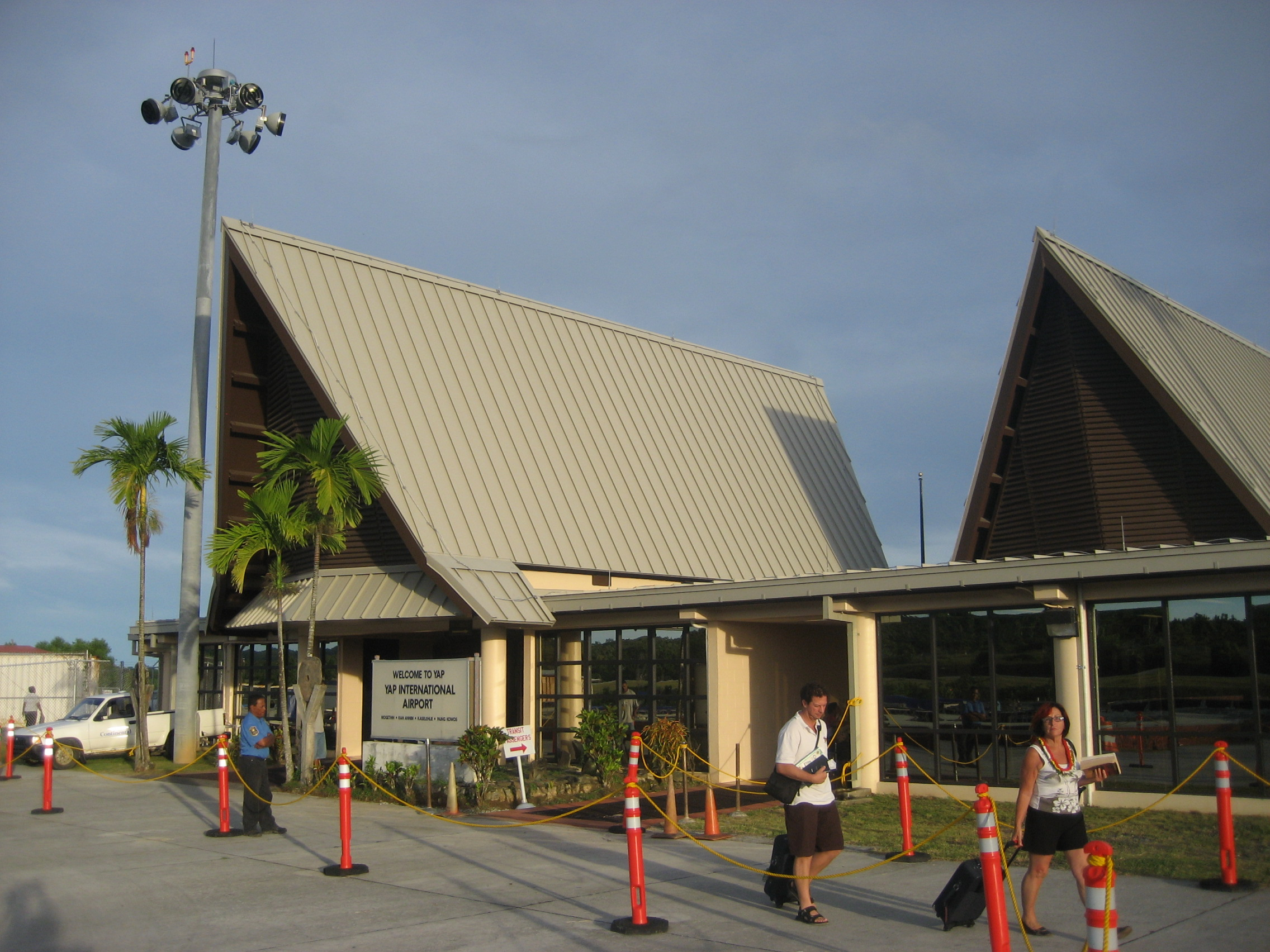
Terminal Building of Yap International Airport, viewed from apron

Airlines	Destinations
Caroline Islands Air	Charter: Chuuk, Fais, Koror, Pohnpei, Ulithi
Pacific Missionary Aviation	Fais, Koror, Ulithi, Woleai
United Airlines	Guam

In addition to the listed air services, Asia Pacific Airlines transports cargo (including U.S. mail) to and from Yap from Palau and to Guam, respectively.
