= Falalop =

Island in Yap, Federated States of Micronesia

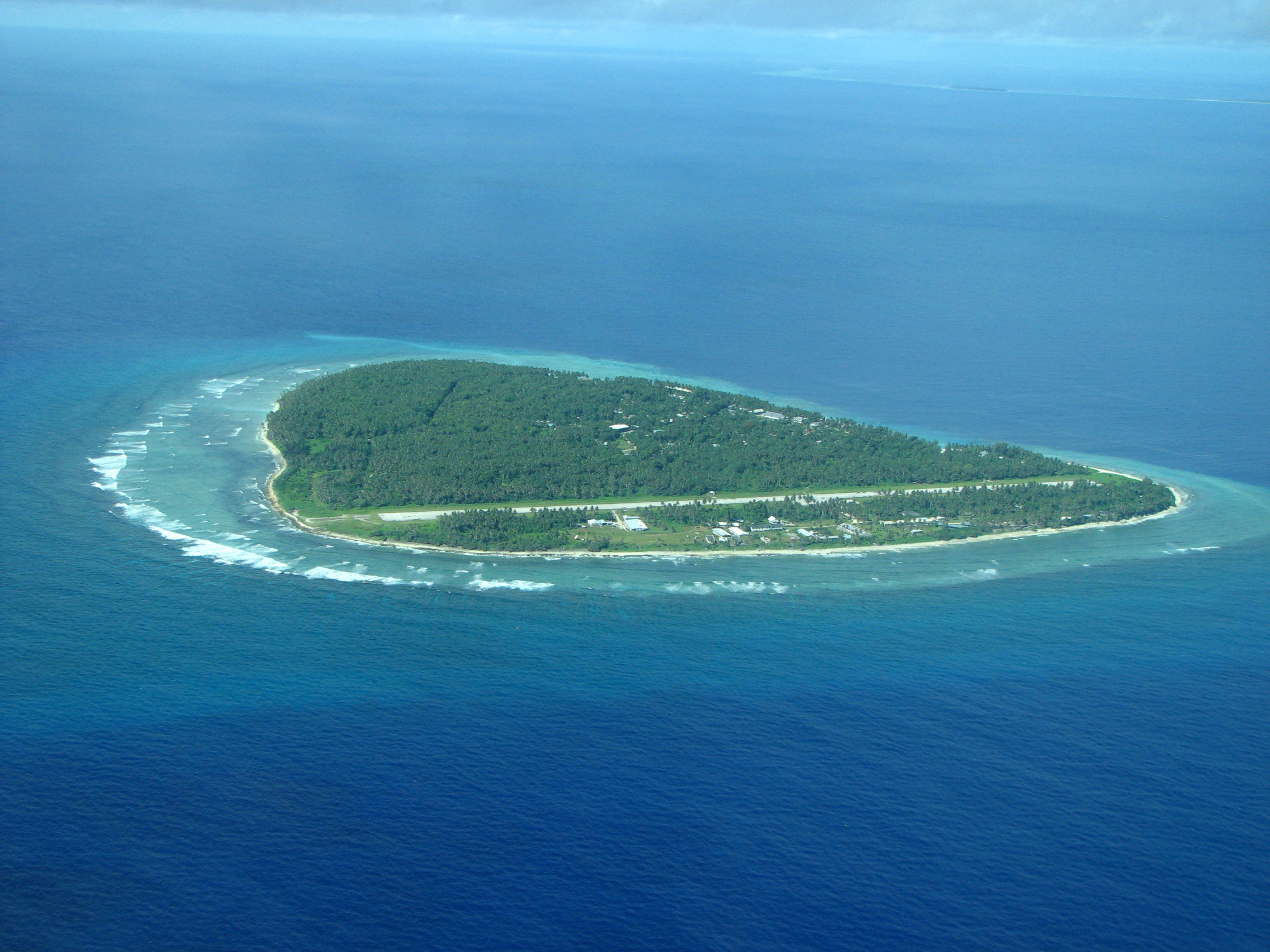
- Aerial view of Falalop in 2008

- Location within Federated States of Micronesia

Geography
- Coordinates: 10.017°N 139.790°E
- Area: 0.0093 km^{2} (0.0036 sq mi)
- Width: 0.15 km (0.093 mi)
- Highest elevation: 6.3 m (20.7 ft)

Administration
- Federated States of Micronesia
- State: Yap

Demographics
- Population: 500–600

Falalop (Ulithian: Fl'aalop) is an island in the Ulithi Atoll in the western Pacific Ocean, approximately 191 km (103 nmi) east of Yap. It is part of the Yap State within the Federated States of Micronesia.

== Overview ==
Falalop is 0.93 ha (2.3 acres) in area, triangular in shape, surrounded by a fringing reef up to 150 m (490 ft) wide, with a maximum elevation of 6.3 m (21 ft) above sea level. It has the largest population of the four inhabited islets of Ifalik, between 500 and 600 people. Falalop is separated from the Ulithi Atoll by a deep 400 m (1,300 ft) wide channel.

Ulithi Airport is located on the island, as well as one of the three Yap State public high schools.

=== Transportation ===
The Ulithi Civil Airfield serves as the main air link with the rest of Federated States of Micronesia. Air services are provided by Pacific Missionary Aviation, although there are no regularly scheduled flights.

=== Education ===
Outer Islands High School is located on the island.
