= Pohnpei International Airport =

Airport in the Federated States of Micronesia

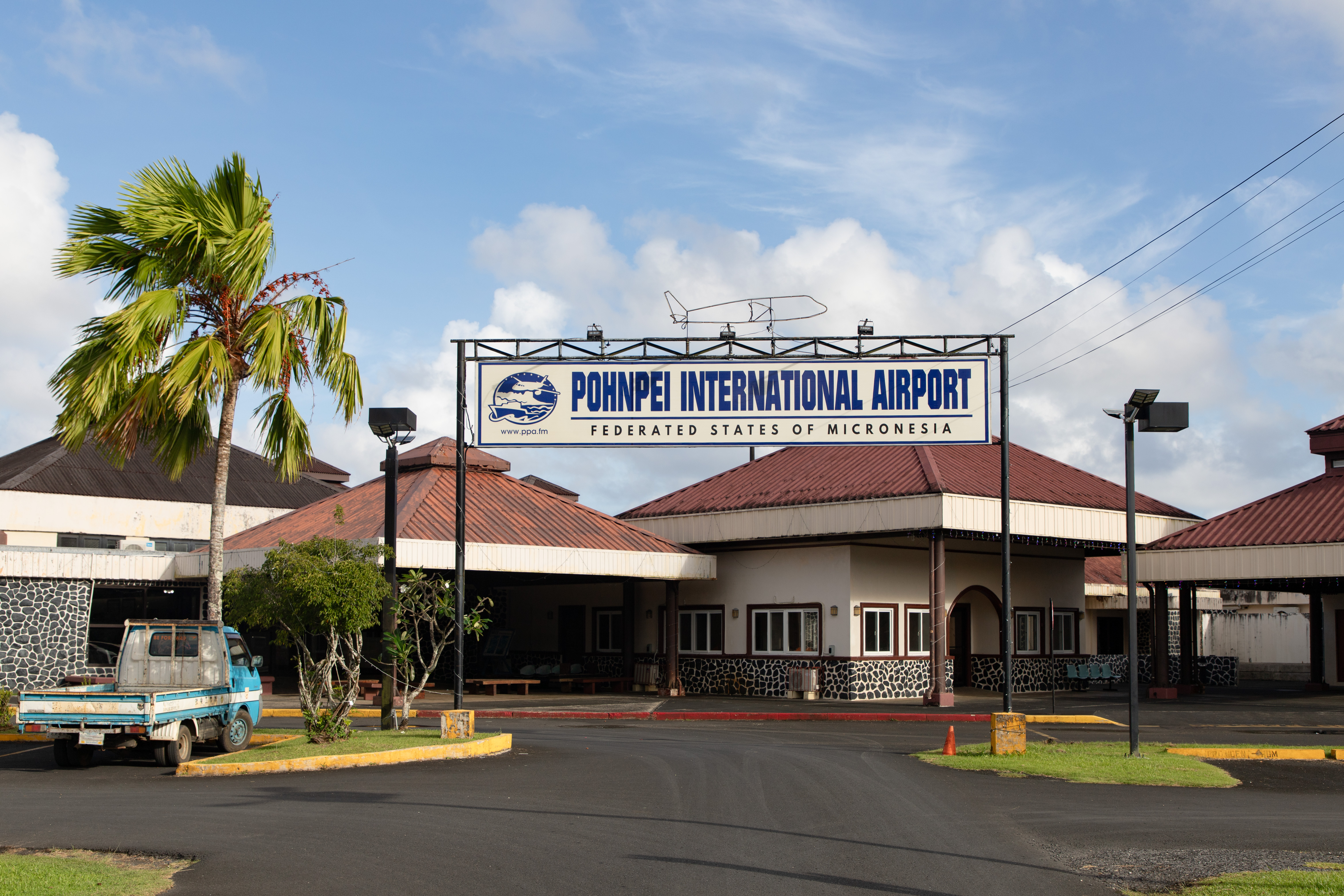
- Main entrance of airport

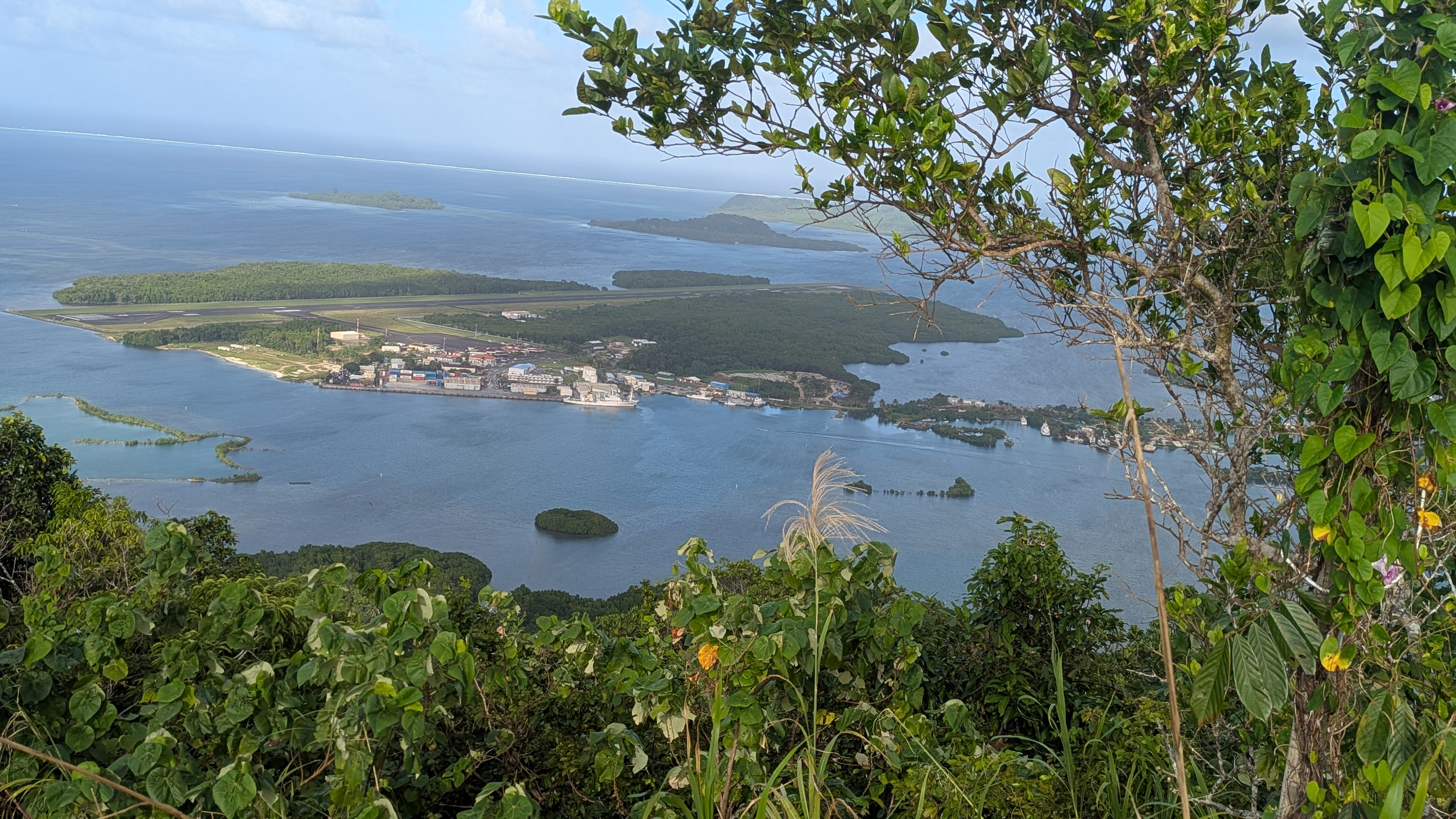
- IATA: PNI; ICAO: PTPN

Summary
- Airport type: Public
- Location: Pohnpei
- Elevation AMSL: 10 ft (3.0 m)
- Coordinates: 06°59′06″N 158°12′32″E

Map
- Location of airport in Federated States of Micronesia

Runways
Direction	Length		Surface
Direction	ft	m	Surface
09/27	6,600	2,012	Asphalt

Pohnpei International Airport (IATA: PNI, ICAO: PTPN) is an airport serving Pohnpei, Federated States of Micronesia. It is located on Deketik, an islet connected to Pohnpei Island by a causeway. It is close to Palikir, the capital of the Federated States of Micronesia.

The extension of the Pohnpei International Airport began in 2009 and was to be completed in 2011. The Government of Japan has agreed to provide about US$29 million for the project. The project includes extending the runway by 228 m and improving the terminal facilities and apron. Enhancements will help prevent problems such as when a Boeing 727 cargo jet overran the runway and the airport had to be closed for six days in May 2008.

== Airlines and destinations ==
Like many islands within the region, commercial air service is limited due to the small population and tourist traffic. The only current scheduled passenger services for Pohnpei are the United Airlines (formerly Continental Micronesia) Island Hopper flights operated with Boeing 737-800 jetliners between Guam and Honolulu (three times weekly in each direction), the Guam-Chuuk-Pohnpei flights and a flight to Port Moresby on Air Niugini. Also, Caroline Islands Air provides charter flights around the region.

Airlines	Destinations
Caroline Islands Air	Charter: Chuuk, Enewetak, Kapingamarangi, Kosrae, Mwoakilloa Airfield, Nukuoro, Pingelap, Sapwuahfik, Mortlock Islands Airfield (Ta), Woleai, Yap
United Airlines	Chuuk, Guam, Honolulu, Kosrae, Kwajalein, Majuro

In addition to passenger services, Asia Pacific Airlines transports cargo (including U.S. mail) to and from Pohnpei.

== See also ==
- Island Hopper scheduled air service
