= Continental Micronesia =

Airline of Guam and Micronesia (1968–2010)

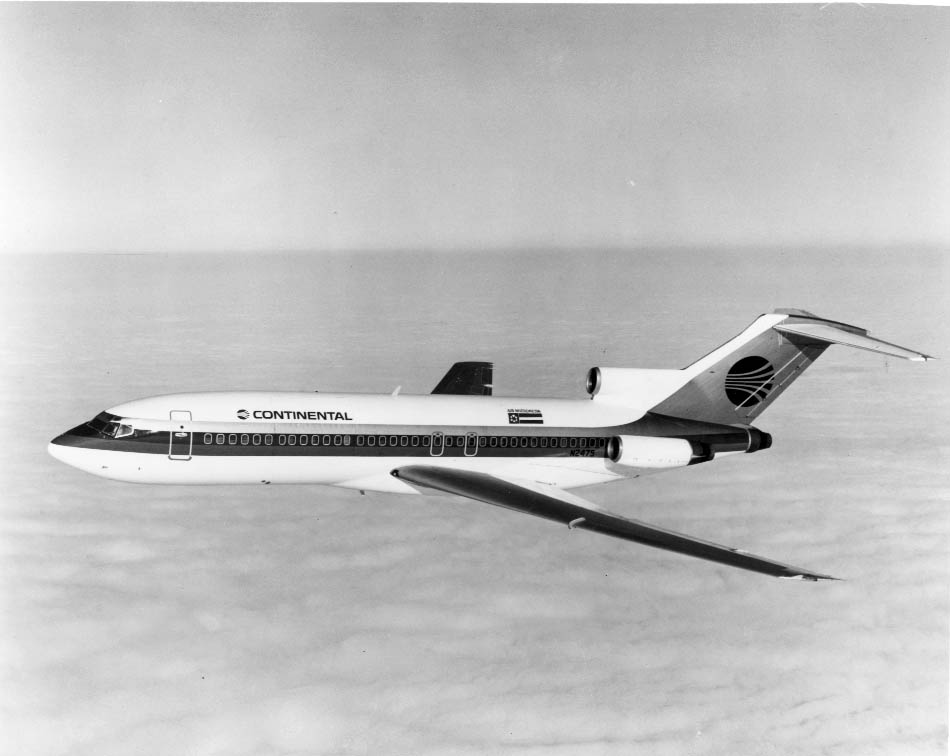
- A Boeing 727 of Air Micronsia
IATA	ICAO	Call sign
CS	CMI	AIR MIKE
- Founded: May 16, 1968 (as Air Micronesia)
- Ceased operations: December 22, 2010 (merged into Continental Airlines); April 1, 2017 (merged into United Airlines)
- Hubs: Antonio B. Won Pat International Airport
- Frequent-flyer program: OnePass
- Alliance: SkyTeam (affiliate; 2004–2009); Star Alliance (affiliate; 2009–2010)
- Parent company: United Continental Holdings
- Headquarters: Tamuning, Guam (U.S.)

Continental Micronesia, Inc. (CMI) was an American company which was a wholly owned subsidiary of Continental Airlines. It operated daily flights to Honolulu, Hawaii, as well as international services to Asia, Micronesia and Australia from its hub at Antonio B. Won Pat International Airport on Guam, a U.S. territory in the western Pacific Ocean. During its final years, the airline, a Delaware corporation, was headquartered in the old terminal building at Antonio B. Won Pat International Airport in Tamuning, Guam.

On December 22, 2010, as a result of the Continental-United Airlines merger earlier that year, the FAA approved the combination of Continental Micronesia's air carrier operations with Continental's under the single Part 121 operating certificate of Continental; although Continental Micronesia remained as a corporation, all flights were then operated directly by Continental Airlines. This step was intended to simplify future integration steps between Continental and United. The callsign, ICAO and IATA codes were changed to reflect the new operating certificate.

As of 2012, the Continental Micronesia employee group, now a subset of United Continental Holdings, had 1,222 employees. The subsidiary was merged into United effective April 1, 2017. On June 27, 2019 the subsidiary's parent company name was changed from United Continental Holdings to United Airlines Holdings.

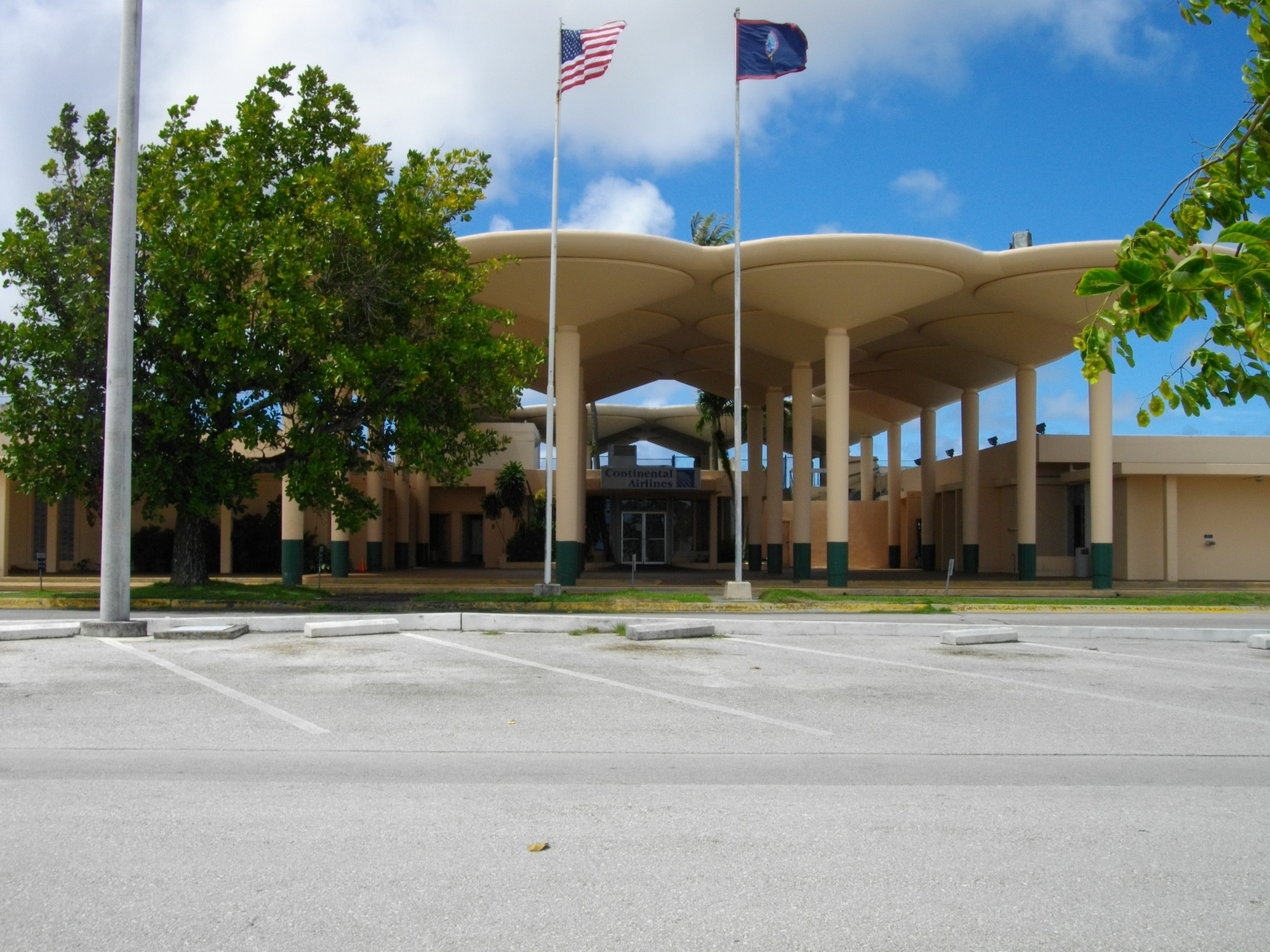
Continental Micronesia's headquarters was stationed at Antonio B. Won Pat International Airport

== Code data ==
Continental Micronesia flights used the regular Continental "CO" code on ticketing systems and for frequent-flyer benefit accounting, but used its ICAO code "CMI" and callsign "Air Mike" with air traffic control authorities. In airport terminals, Continental Micronesia flights were listed separately (from Continental) with its IATA code "CS". During the final decade, three airports had both "Air Mike" and mainline Continental present: Hong Kong, Tokyo and Honolulu.

== History ==
=== Before Air Micronesia ===
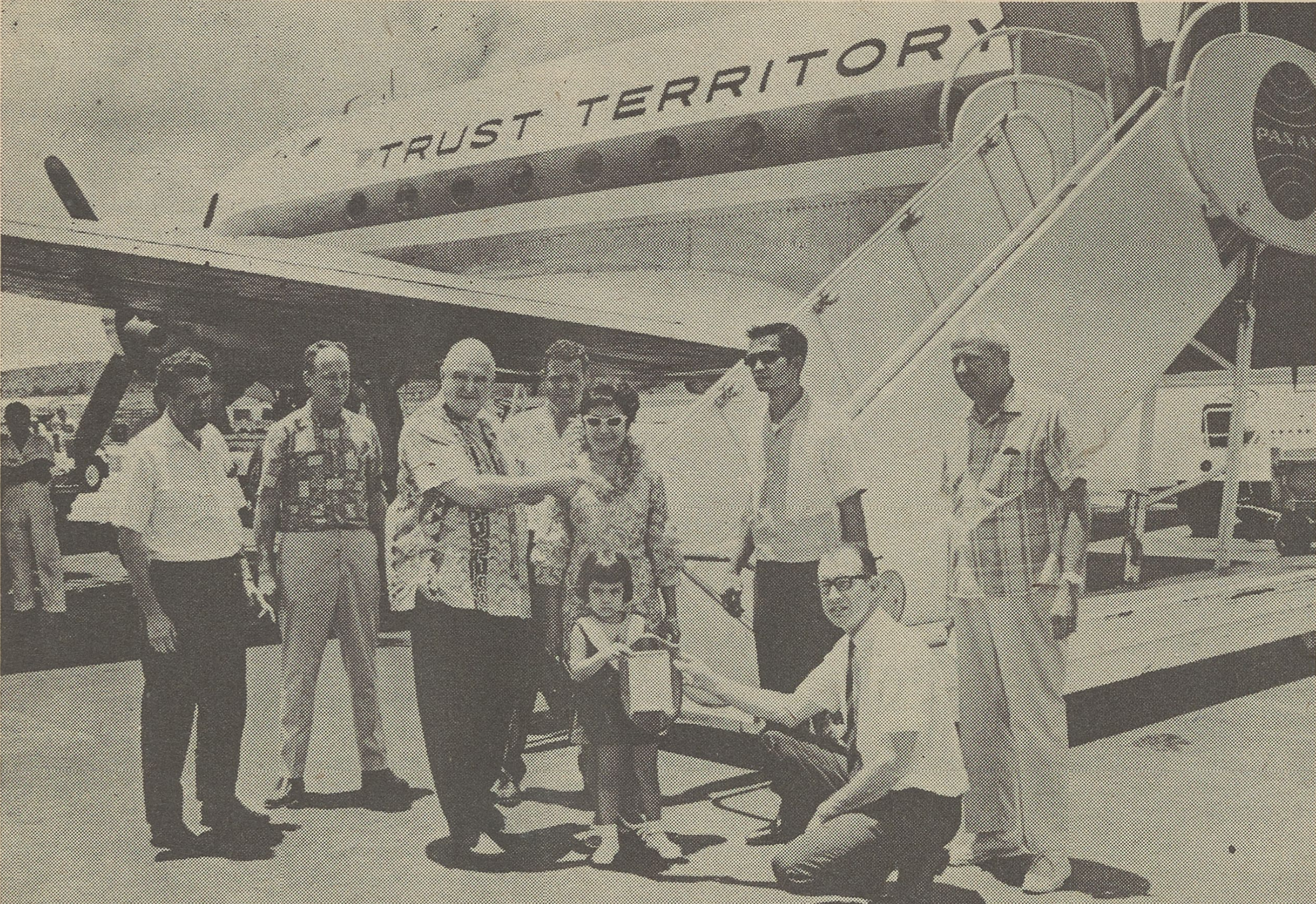
May 15, 1968: last passenger off the last flight (a DC-4) of the Pan Am-operated Trust Territory Air Service. Air Micronesia started the next day

The islands of the Trust Territory of the Pacific Islands (TTPI) were, before World War II, those of the pre-World War II South Seas Mandate of the Empire of Japan. From 1934 through 1941, the empire developed a commercial airline network in the mandate, though it was little used by Micronesians. After World War II, the TTPI was initially the responsibility of the US Navy, which provided civilian air transport with Martin PBM-5A Mariner and Douglas R4D (naval DC-3) aircraft. The PBM required JATO to take off at Yap.

As of July 1951, responsibility for the TTPI transferred to the Department of the Interior. From that date through May 1968, the TTPI ran its own airline, Trust Territory Air Service, using contractors to fly the aircraft. Contractors were responsible for flying aircraft and line maintenance; the TTPI owned the aircraft and took care of everything else. The contractors were:

- Transocean Air Lines from 1951 through its collapse in 1960. Transocean initially flew PBY Catalina amphibious aircraft, before transitioning to Grumman SA-16 amphibians.
- Pan American World Airways from 1960 through 1968. Pan Am took over the SA-16s and added Douglas DC-4s. The aircraft were branded "Trust Territory" (see photo).

=== Startup ===
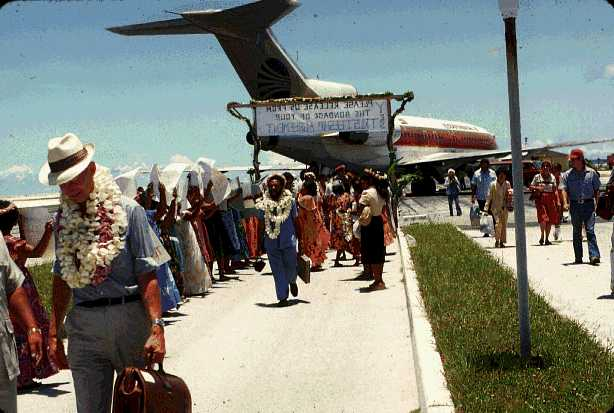
Arrival of United Nations Visiting Mission, Majuro, 1978. Sign reads "Please release us from the bondage of your trusteeship agreement." An Air Mike Boeing 727 is in the background.

The airline was established by Continental and other regional shareholders in the former U.S. Trust Territory and started operations on May 16, 1968, as Air Micronesia, hence the nickname and callsign "Air Mike". Service was started with a Boeing 727-100 jetliner, number 475, which was nicknamed "Ju-Ju," and a Douglas DC-6B propliner. It also operated two Grumman SA-16/ HU-16 Albatross amphibians to fly from Chuuk (Truk) to Pohnpei (Ponape), until an airfield could be built that could accommodate the 727. The 727's underside was coated with teflon, due to it having to operate on coral runways. Additionally, the plane had to carry spare parts and a mechanic, as well as open-water survival gear and (beginning in 1975) onboard doppler radar, then a rarity. The airline also operated Boeing 727-100 Combi aircraft models which were capable of transporting freight pallets on the main deck of the jetliner just aft of the cockpit in addition to passengers seated in the rear coach compartment. By 1983, Continental Micronesia was operating all-passenger Boeing 727-100 and 727-200 aircraft in addition to mixed passenger/freight 727-100 Combi aircraft from its Guam hub.

William H. Stewart of the Saipan Tribune stated that the airline's foundation "in particular" "was probably the single most important factor in the future development of what were once remote and isolated islands in the Pacific." Stewart added that the jets "distorted the traveler's impression of time and distance and brought the islands closer to major market areas in Asia." The airline had a virtual monopoly in the Micronesia region. In the 1970s, each district that the airline flew to had an entirely Micronesian employee base, with the exception of Saipan, which housed the airline's headquarters. William H. Stewart of the Saipan Tribune said the airline "was the only travel link many had with the world beyond the horizon."

The airline started service from Guam to Japan after New Tokyo International Airport (current Narita) opened in 1978. As Continental's share and roles in Air Mike changed, the airline's name became "Continental Air Micronesia." Eventually, Continental owned 100% of Air Mike, which at one point provided the only scheduled service directly between Guam and any point in the 50 United States (namely, to/from Honolulu, Hawaii) although other airlines, notably Pan Am, Braniff International and South Pacific Island Airways, had attempted to provide nonstop service between Guam and Honolulu.

Since May 1987, the company had the contract to provide passenger and cargo service from Honolulu and Guam to the states of Kosrae, Pohnpei, Chuuk and Yap.

Before being headquartered in Guam, Continental Micronesia was headquartered in Saipan, Northern Mariana Islands. As time passed, the airline's Saipan traffic decreased due to the 1986 breakup of the Trust Territory of the Pacific Islands, which was subdivided into smaller political units. Because of the breakup, fewer people needed to travel to Saipan, which had been the capital of the trust territory.

In 1995, Continental Airlines acquired the 9% of the company that it did not already own for $72 million from a group headed by the late Larry Hillblom.

=== 2000 to 2009 ===
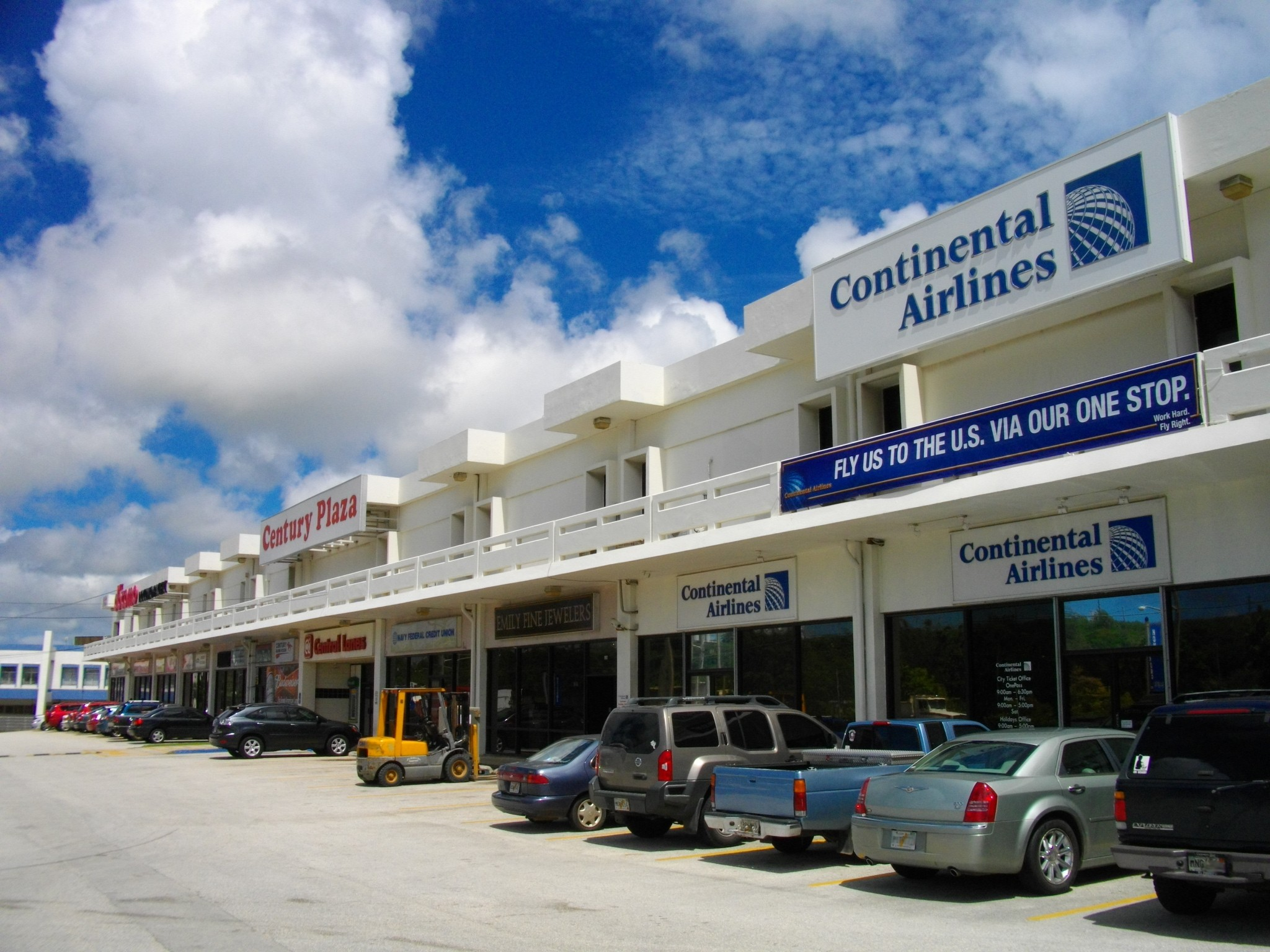
Guam Century Plaza in Tamuning, Guam in July 2010, which housed Continental Micronesia/Continental Airlines city ticket offices

By 2003, the Guam International Airport Authority moved commuter airlines out of Antonio B. Won Pat International Airport's Commuter Terminal and leased the entire facility to Continental. In 2003, it flew from Honolulu to Guam, and from Guam to numerous PacRim and Pacific island destinations.

As of 2004, most of the airline's employees were Guam-based, due to the location of the corporate headquarters and the airline's main hub. By 2005 Continental Micronesia's business on the island of Saipan had decreased, prompting layoffs in Saipan.

Continental Micronesia employed 1,500 people and was Guam's largest private-sector employer. It operated 236 departures each week between 23 cities.

Massachusetts-based Cape Air began services in the Mariana Islands under the Continental Connection banner on July 1, 2004. Soon afterward, Continental Micronesia eliminated most jet services to Saipan in favor of Cape Air's smaller-sized aircraft and increased frequency.

In 2008, Continental Micronesia generated profits, operating a "niche" Guam-Honolulu route. In addition Japanese tourists, wanting to save money, decided to travel to locations closer to Japan for vacation, so Continental Micronesia gained Japanese passengers. As of that year the airline's annual payroll in Guam was $90 million ($134,582,689 when adjusted for inflation). Thirty percent of the airline's business came from its 4,300-mile island-hopper route, which began in Honolulu, made five stops and ended—14 hours and 10 minutes later—in Hagatna, Guam's capital city.

In May 2008, expected subsequent military buildup and population growth could have led to an expansion of Continental Micronesia flights to and from Guam. However, on June 12, 2008, Continental's announcement of cuts of services, routes and destinations due to high fuel prices included termination of flights to Hong Kong (which has since resumed) and Bali. Also among the cuts is the termination of the Saipan-Manila flights on July 15 which is the last remaining Air Mike flight for Saipan, the airline's original hub 40 years ago. According to an opinion columnist for the Saipan Tribune, the “declared” reason for the cancellation of the Saipan-Manila route was that NCLEX tests were now available in Manila, so Filipino nurses no longer had to travel to Saipan to take the test. Before the flight's cancellation, the flight also served medical referrals from the Commonwealth of the Northern Mariana Islands to Manila and non-USA visa alien contract workers who were unable to transit to their final destinations via Guam; the author opined that the alien workers “particularly were Air Micronesia’s captive audience.” With only Continental Connection/Cape Air services left, Continental closed its Saipan city ticket office on the same day.

In December 2009, the company began operating nonstop service between Honolulu and Nadi, Fiji.

=== 2010 and beyond ===
The 2010 United-Continental merger resulted in the elimination of Continental Micronesia's operating certificate as the new entity worked towards a single air operator's certificate (SOC). The combination of Continental Micronesia's operating certificate into Continental's was approved on December 22, 2010.

United Airlines announced on March 22, 2017 that the "paper" merger would be completed on April 1, 2017 that would officially fold Continental Micronesia into United Airlines. It was previously a subsidiary of United Continental Holdings.

Since then, flights to Micronesia are now directly operated by United Airlines.

== Destinations ==
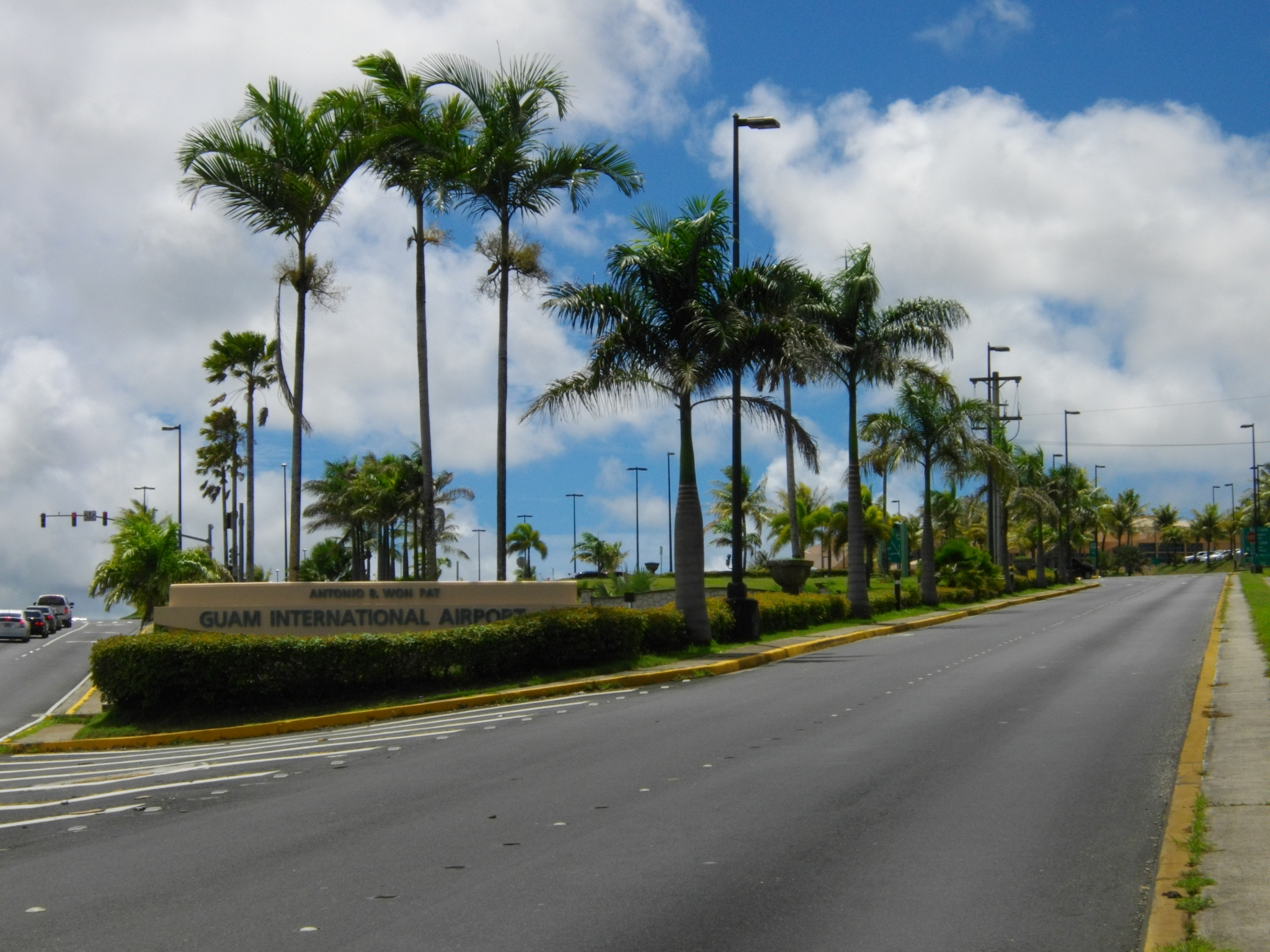
Antonio B. Won Pat International Airport was the hub of Continental Micronesia

Beside providing transportation within Micronesia and between the region and the United States, Continental Micronesia flew to cities in Japan (the region's main source of tourists) and other Pacific Rim destinations.

The airline flew to nine Japanese cities, more than any other U.S. carrier. The airline also operated a five stop "island-hopper" route between Honolulu and Guam. The 4,300-mile (6,900 km) route had an average duration of 14 hours and 10 minutes. Due to the special requirements of the route, each aircraft flying on this route houses an extra pilot, an extra flight attendant, a mechanic, and extra spare parts in case of a mechanical failure. Historically the airline received little competition on the "island-hopper" route. Continental Micronesia provided the only scheduled jet service in the Federated States of Micronesia and Majuro, Marshall Islands. The airline's route network linked to the network of its parent company at Honolulu, Hong Kong, Tokyo, Los Angeles, San Francisco, Houston, and Newark.

Due to small island populations and the corresponding amount of passenger traffic, many of Continental Micronesia's routes were flown less than daily (some as infrequent as twice weekly). The only routes with daily flights were between Guam and Fukuoka, Honolulu, Manila, Nagoya, Palau, and Tokyo.

== Fleet ==
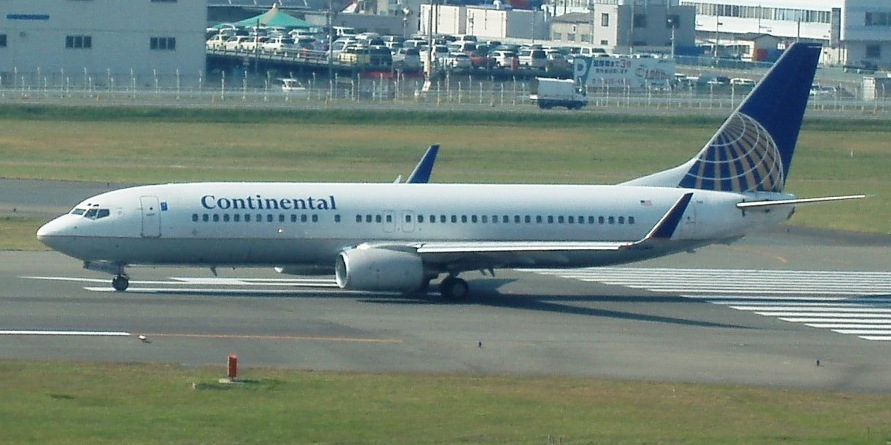
A Continental Micronesia Boeing 737-800 at Fukuoka Airport in November 2006

As of early 2010, Continental Micronesia operated 12 Boeing 737 and 4 Boeing 767-400 aircraft (in Pacific Configuration) from Antonio B. Won Pat International Airport on Guam. The aircraft were all owned by Continental Airlines and were rotated to Continental Micronesia.

Continental Micronesia Fleet, November 2011
Aircraft	In Service	Passengers			Notes
Aircraft	In Service	F	Y	Total	Notes
Boeing 737-700	4	12	112	124	N13720 is painted in Star Alliance livery
Boeing 737-800	8	14	141	155
Boeing 767-400ER	4	20	236	256	All have rotated out to the U.S. mainland in favor of United's Boeing 777-200 (Domestic configuration) service.

=== Former fleet ===
- Boeing 747
- McDonnell Douglas DC-10
- Boeing 727 - includes all-passenger Boeing 727-100 and 727-200 aircraft as well as Boeing 727-100 mixed passenger/freight Combi aircraft
- Boeing 757-200
- Douglas DC-6B (prop aircraft initially assigned to Air Micronesia by Continental Airlines)
- Grumman SA-16 (prop amphibian aircraft initially operated by Air Micronesia)

== Accidents and incidents ==
- On November 21, 1980, Air Micronesia Flight 614, operated by a Boeing 727-100C registered N18479, crashed while landing at Yap International Airport on the island of Yap in Micronesia. The aircraft landed heavily 13 feet (4 m) short of the airport's runway and the right landing gear was torn off. The Boeing 727 then slid along the runway, gradually veering off the side into the jungle. It stopped about 1,700 feet (520 m) from the touchdown point and a fire broke out which destroyed the aircraft. All of the 67 passengers and 6 crew members on board evacuated the burning aircraft and survived the accident.

== See also ==
- Continental Air Services, Inc
- List of defunct airlines of the United States

== Bibliography ==
- Serling R.J., Maverick, Doubleday & Co., Garden City (N.Y.), 1974
- Davies R.E.G., Continental Airlines-The first fifty years 1934-1984, Pioneer Publications Inc., The Woodlands (TX), 1984
