= Chuuk International Airport =

Airport in Weno, the Federated States of Micronesia

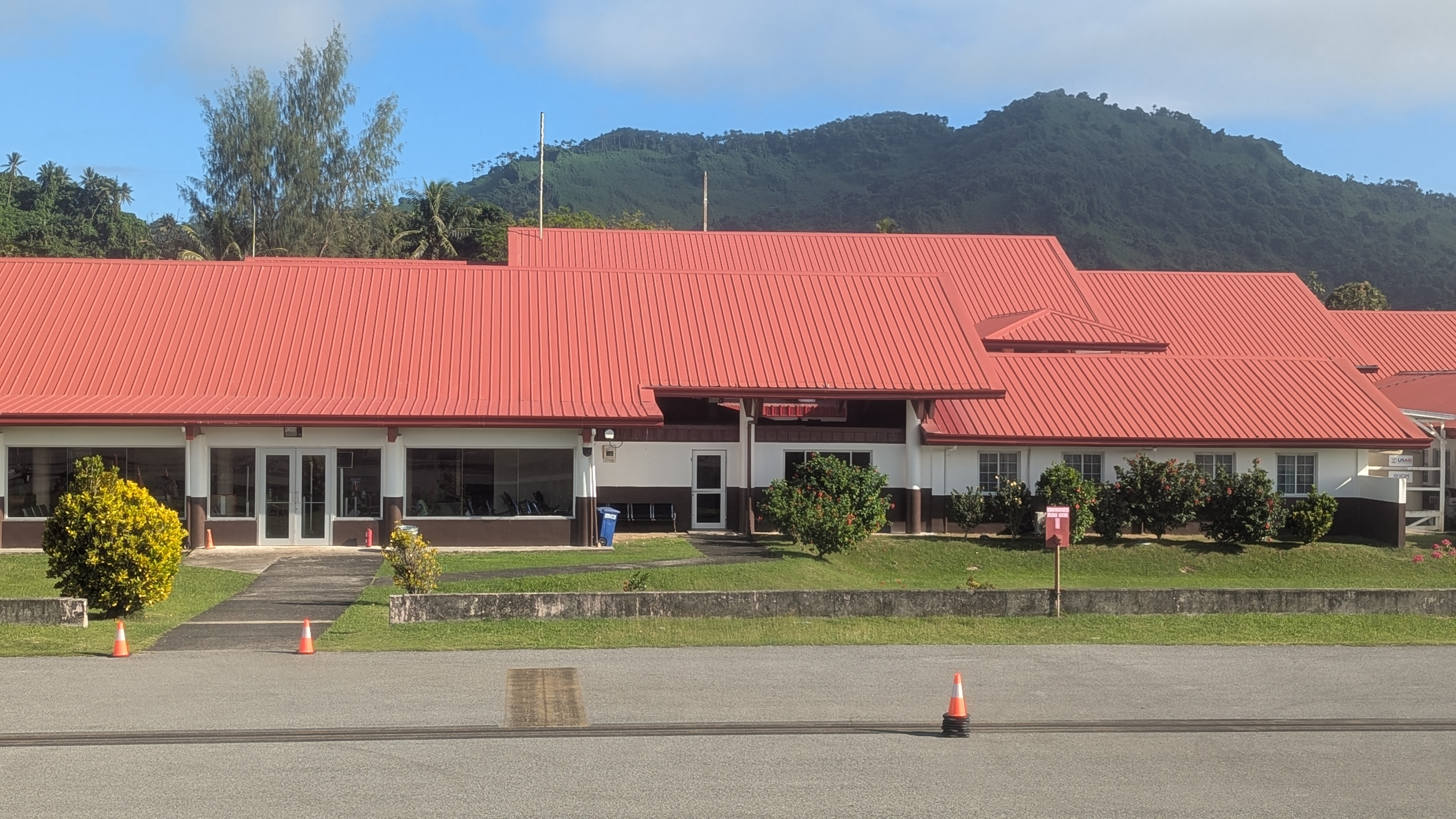

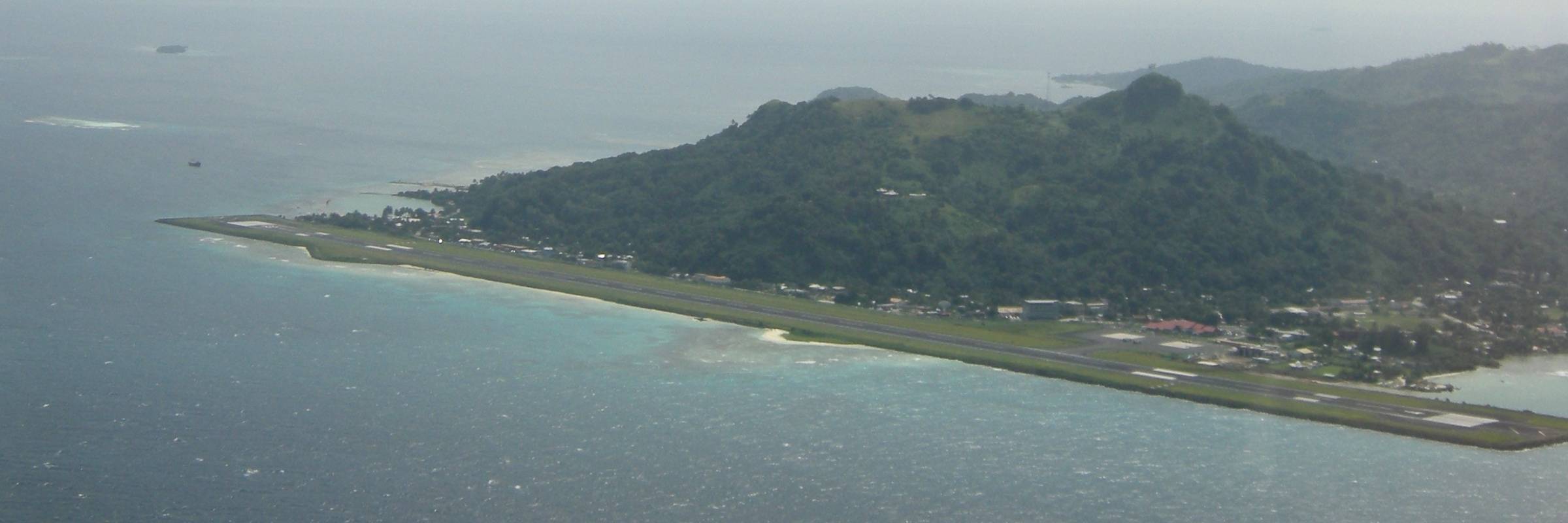
- IATA: TKK; ICAO: PTKK

Summary
- Airport type: Public
- Owner: Government
- Operator: Civil Government
- Location: Weno
- Elevation AMSL: 11 ft / 3 m
- Coordinates: 07°27′43″N 151°50′35″E

Map
- Location of airport in Federated States of Micronesia

Runways
Direction	Length		Surface
Direction	ft	m	Surface
04/22	6,006	1,831	Asphalt

Chuuk International Airport (IATA: TKK, ICAO: PTKK) is an airport located on Weno (formerly Moen), the main island of the State of Chuuk (formerly Truk) in the Federated States of Micronesia.

== History ==
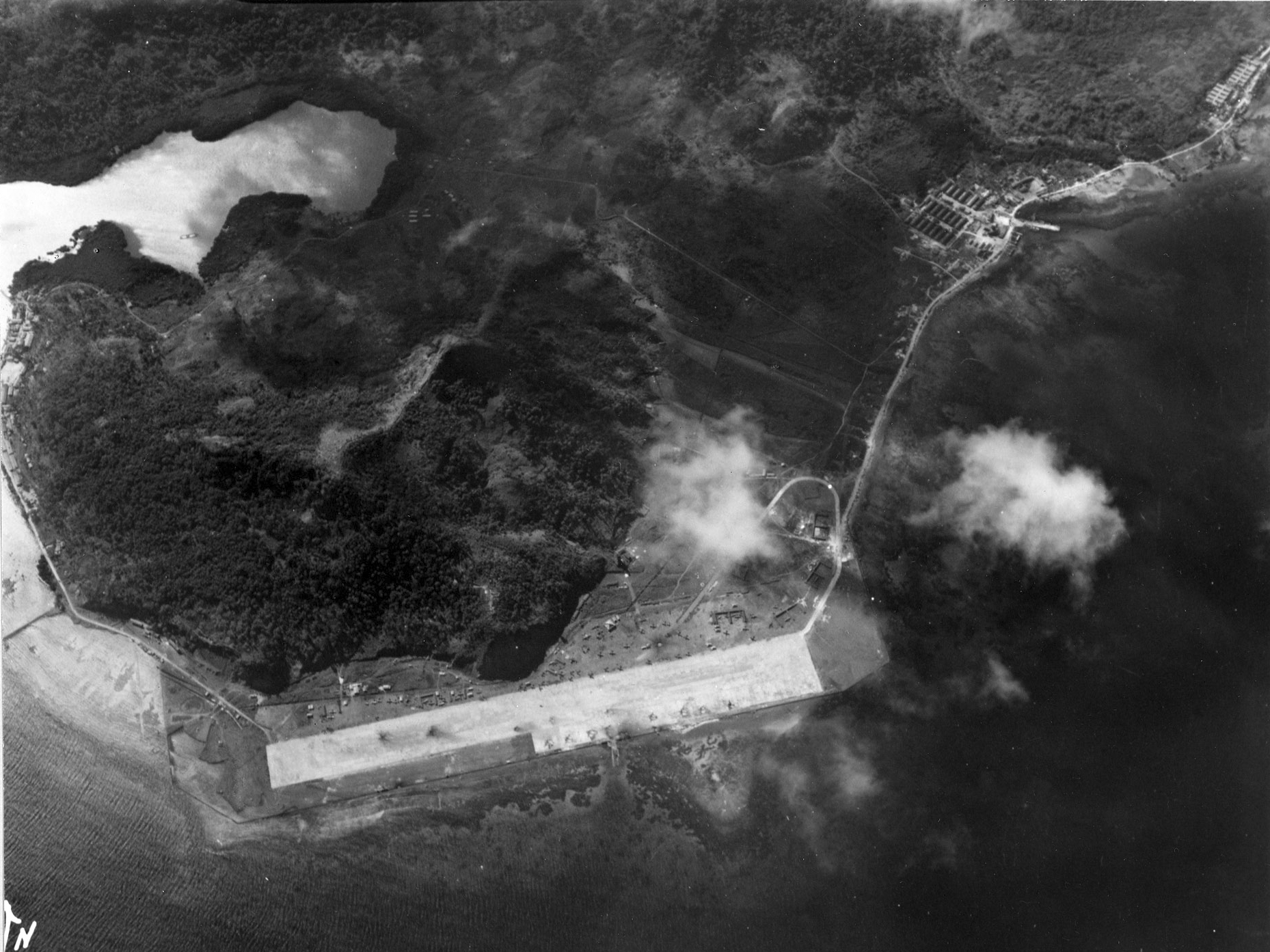
Chuuk Airport (Formerly Moen Airfield 1) in February 1944 from a TBF Avenger of VT-6 from the USS Intrepid CV-11.

Chuuk International Airport was originally built by Japan between November and December 1942. Back then it was known as Harushima Airfield to the Japanese or Moen Air Field 1. With around 80 support buildings including a large hangar and underground storage for fuel and ammunition, it was used by fighter, bomber and reconnaissance aircraft at Naval Base Truk. Between October 4, 1944, and June 27, 1945, the airfield was attacked by USAAF aircraft.

== Airlines and destinations ==
Like many islands within the region, commercial air service is rather limited.

For many years the only service was the three-times-weekly Island Hopper flight between Guam and Honolulu operated by United Airlines, (formerly Continental Micronesia), plus another weekly flight between Guam and Pohnpei. In June 2015, Nauru Airlines resumed a once-weekly service but ended in 2016.

Airlines	Destinations
Caroline Islands Air	Charter: Fais, Houk, Onoun, Pohnpei, Ta, Ulithi, Woleai, Yap
United Airlines	Guam, Honolulu, Kosrae, Kwajalein, Majuro, Pohnpei

== Incidents and accidents ==
- 28 September 2018 - Air Niugini Flight 73, a Boeing 737-800, landed short of the runway and came to rest in a lagoon. One Filipino passenger died and was recovered later by divers. The remaining 35 passengers and 11 crew escaped serious injury. The aircraft remains at the bottom of the lagoon.
