= Fais Island =

Island in Yap, Federated States of Micronesia

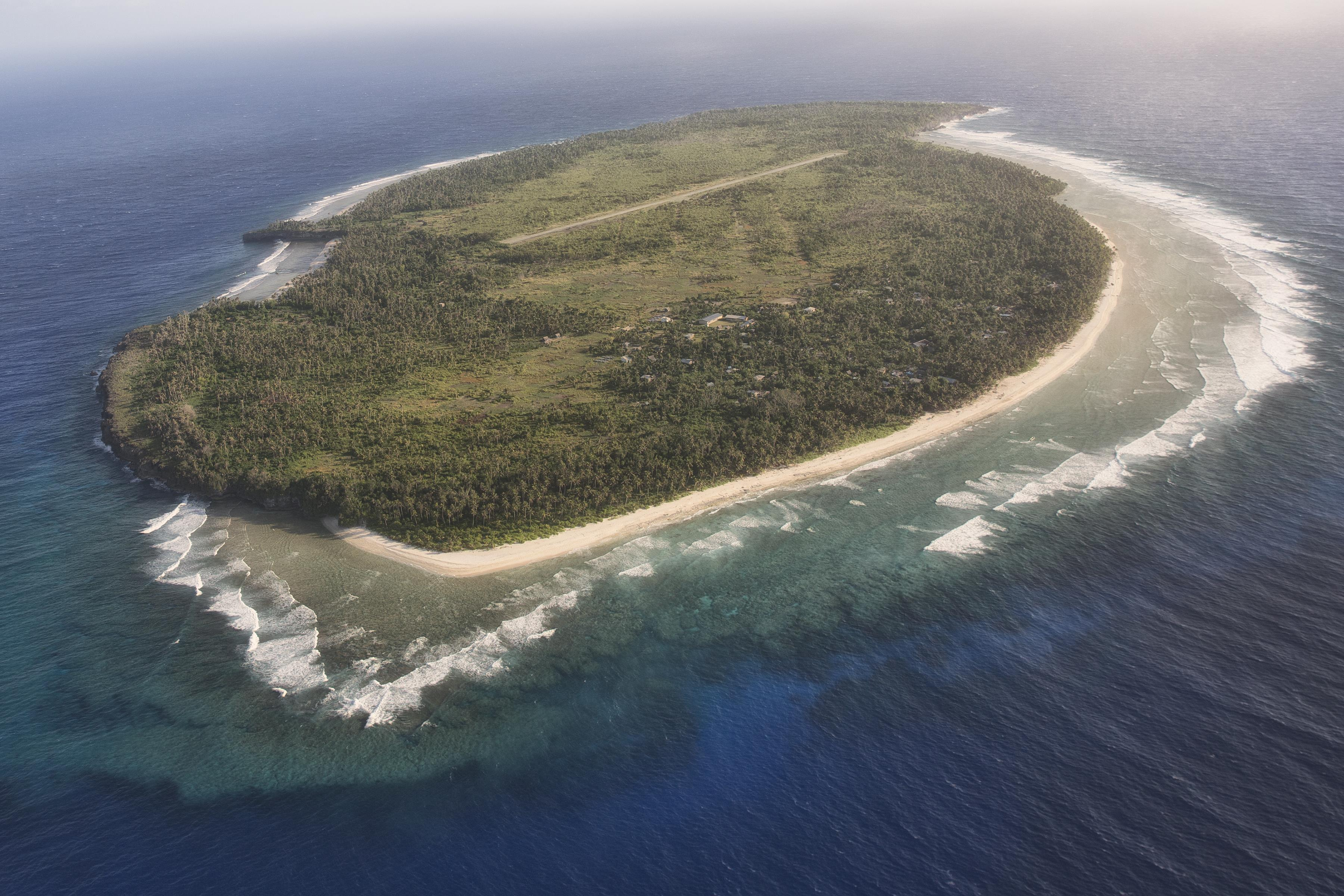
- Fais Island in 2015

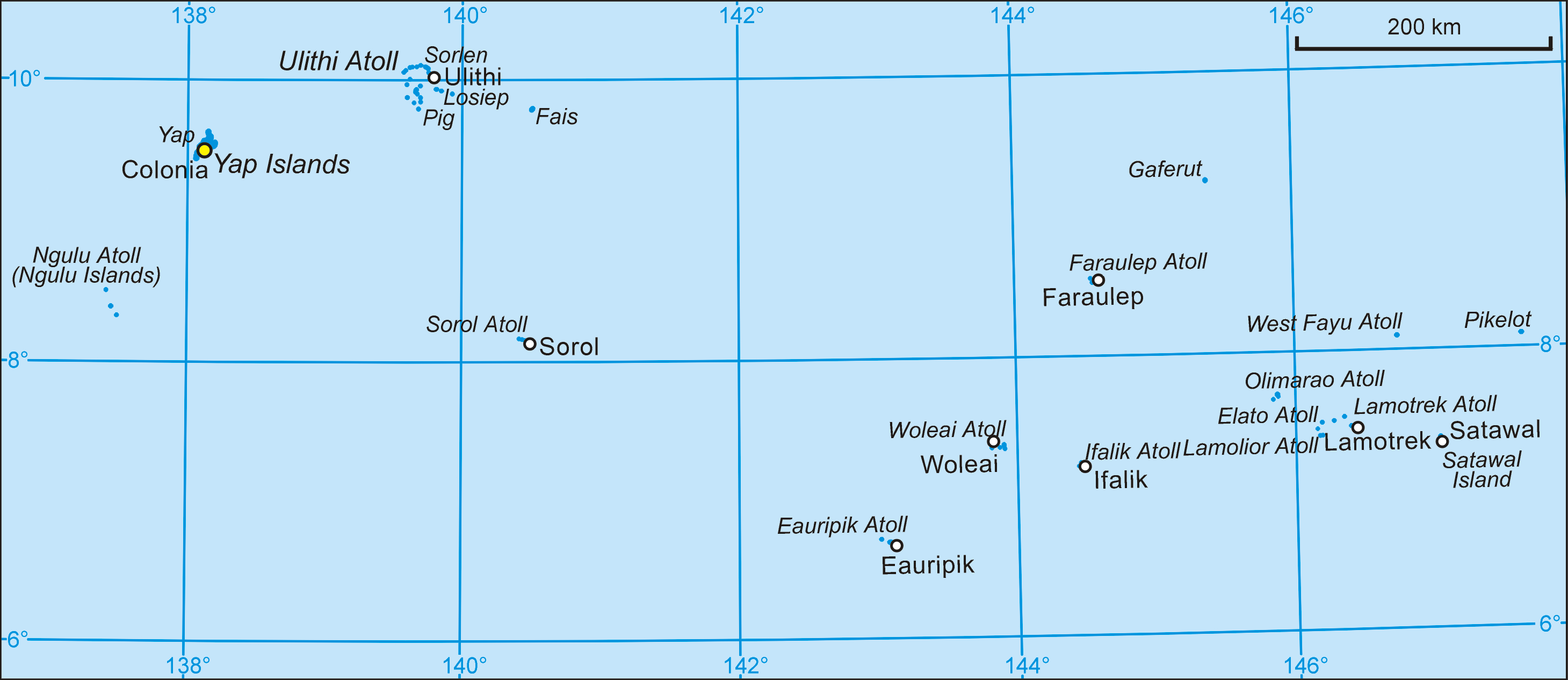

Geography
- Location: North Pacific
- Coordinates: 9°45′37″N 140°31′15″E
- Archipelago: Caroline Islands
- Area: 2.6 km^{2} (1.0 sq mi)
- Highest elevation: 18 m (59 ft)

Administration
- Federated States of Micronesia

Demographics
- Population: 463 (2023)
- Languages: Ulithian
- Ethnic groups: Micronesian

Fais Island is a raised coral island in the eastern Caroline Islands in the Pacific Ocean, and forms a legislative district in Yap State in the Federated States of Micronesia. Fais Island is located approximately 87 kilometres (54 mi) east of Ulithi and 251 kilometres (156 mi) northeast of Yap and is the closest land to Challenger Deep, about 180 miles away. The name may mean 'rising rock.'

The population of Fais Island was 294 in 2010.

Location of Fais in the Pacific Ocean

== Geography ==
Fais Island is an oblong, oval-shaped raised coralline mass with a maximum elevation of 18 metres (59 ft), surrounded by a narrow lagoon and fringing reef except for its northeast and southwest extremities. It has a total land area of 2.6 square kilometres (1.0 sq mi).

== Legend ==
Friedrich Ratzel in The History of Mankind related in 1896 that the Polynesian legend of the fishing up of the land from the depths of the sea took the following form in Yap: Motigtig went out fishing with his two elder brothers Morangrang and Motal. First, he hooked up crops of all sorts, and taro; then the island of Fais. His hook was stolen and kept by the chief in Gachpar in order to control the people; and since, if it were destroyed, Fais also would disappear, the inhabitants of that island were in constant subjection to the menaces of the Yap chiefs in Gagil.

== History ==
First recorded European sighting of Fais Island was by the Spanish expedition of Ruy López de Villalobos on 23 January 1543. Quite surprisingly for the Spaniards, the local people came out in canoes making the sign of the cross and saying "Buenos días, matelotes!" in perfect sixteenth century Spanish ("Good day, sailors!"), this being an evidence that one of the previous Spanish expeditions had been in the area. Fais was therefore charted as Matelotes. Having known about this story, António Galvão governor of Ternate at the time, in his Tratado dos Descubrimientos of 1563 says that this was because he had sent one Francisco de Castro as commander of a ship on a proselytizing mission to the islands discovered in the area of Fais by the Portuguese Diego da Rocha (Ulithi in 1526). However, while this could be a natural explanation of the incident, it doesn't explain why, according to Villalobos' records the local people greeted them in "perfect" Spanish and not in Portuguese. The original account of this story is included in the report that the Augustinian Fray Jerónimo de Santisteban, traveling with the Villalobos' expedition, wrote for the Viceroy of New Spain, while in Kochi during the voyage home.

French naval captain Louis Tromelin visited the island during a journey through the Pacific 1828-29

As with all of the Caroline Islands, Fais was sold by Spain to the Empire of Germany in 1899. The island came under the control of the Empire of Japan after World War I, and was subsequently administered under the South Seas Mandate. Japan built a radio station, Japanese phosphate refinery and oil refinery. Allied forces occupied Fais Island from January 1, 1945 and built an airstrip. Following World War II, the island came under the control of the United States of America and was administered as part of the Trust Territory of the Pacific Islands from 1947, and became part of the Federated States of Micronesia from 1979.

== Fais Airfield ==
Fais Airfield
- IATA: none; ICAO: none

Summary
- Airport type: Public
- Owner: Government
- Operator: Civil Government
- Serves: Fais Island
- Interactive map of Fais Airfield

Runways
Direction	Length		Surface
Direction	ft	m	Surface
	3,000	910	Chipseal

The former Allied airstrip was built in World War II by the nearby Naval Base Ulithi. It was formerly serviced by chartered flights by Caroline Islands Air starting in 1995 and now by Pacific Missionary Aviation. The airstrip consists of a 3,000 feet (910 m) chipseal runway with no facilities (no fuel or terminal structure).

== See also ==
- Pacific Ring of Fire
- Challenger Deep
