= Caroline Islands Air =

Air carrier

- Founded: 1995 as Caroline Pacific Air
- Focus cities: Weno (Chuuk), Kolonia (Pohnpei), Ta Island (Mortlock Islands)
- Fleet size: 2
- Destinations: 3

Caroline Islands Air is a charted air carrier based in the Caroline Islands.

Founded in 1995 as Caroline Pacific Air and renamed in 1997.

== Destinations ==
Country / territory	City / Town	Airport	Notes	Refs
Micronesia	Chuuk	Chuuk International Airport		
Micronesia	Pohnpei	Pohnpei International Airport		
Micronesia	Mortlock Islands	Mortlock Islands Airfield		

== Fleet ==
- 1 Cessna Skymaster
- 1 Partenavia P.68
