= List of defunct airlines of Oceania =

This is a list of defunct airlines of Oceania.

== Fiji ==
Defunct airlines of Fiji include:

Airline	Image	IATA	ICAO	Callsign	Commenced operations	Ceased operations	Notes
Air Fiji		PC	FAJ	FIJIAIR	1995	2009	

== Kiribati ==
Defunct airlines of Kiribati include:

Airline	Image	IATA	ICAO	Callsign	Commenced operations	Ceased operations	Notes
Air Tungaru		VK	TUN		1977	1994	

== Norfolk Island ==
Defunct airlines of the Norfolk Island include:

Airline	Image	IATA	ICAO	Callsign	Commenced operations	Ceased operations	Notes
Norfolk Air		N5	NFK	NORFIK AIR	2005	2011	
Norfolk Island Airlines		UG	NIA		1973	1992	
Norfolk Island Airlines (2017)		BNY			2017	2018	leased Boeing 737-300 with Nauru Airlines
Norfolk Jet Express		YE			1997	2004	

== Northern Mariana Islands ==
Defunct airlines of the Northern Mariana Islands include:

Airline	Image	IATA	ICAO	Callsign	Commenced operations	Ceased operations	Notes
Air Marianas					1983	1984	
Fly Marianas					2012	2012	
Pacific Island Aviation		9J	PSA	PACIFIC ISLE	1987	2005	
Saipan Air		Q7			2011	2012	Formed by Tan Holdings (owner of Asia Pacific Airlines). Expected to start operations on 1 July 2012 using ACMI aircraft (wet lease) from Swift Air. However deposits paid to Swift Air "evaporated" when Swift Air entered Chapter 11 and Saipan Air halted its project on 29 June 2012.

== Palau ==
Defunct airlines of Palau include:

Airline	Image	IATA	ICAO	Callsign	Commenced operations	Ceased operations	Notes
Palau Airways		P7	PAU	PALAIRWAYS	2011	2013	
Palau Micronesia Air					2002	2004	
Palau Pacific Airways		ED	AXE	PPA	2014	2018	
Palau Trans Pacific Airlines		GP			2002	2005	

== See also ==
- List of airlines of Oceania

== Bibliography ==
- Howard, Paul (November–December 1999). "Pioneering in the Trusts: Postwar Airline Pioneering in US Trust Territory". Air Enthusiast (84): 35–40. ISSN 0143-5450.
