= List of airlines of Oceania =

This is a list of airlines of Oceania currently in operation.

== Sovereign states ==
=== Federated States of Micronesia ===
- Caroline Islands Air

=== Kiribati ===
- Air Kiribati
- Coral Sun Airways

=== Marshall Islands ===
- Air Marshall Islands

=== Nauru ===
- Nauru Airlines

=== Palau ===
- Belau Air

=== Solomon Islands ===
- Solomon Airlines

=== Tonga ===
- Lulutai Airlines

=== Tuvalu ===
Tuvalu has no currently operating airlines

== Notes ==
Associated states of New Zealand

- Cook Islands - List of airlines of the Cook Islands
- Niue - List of airlines of Niue

Dependencies and other territories

- American Samoa - List of airlines of American Samoa
- Christmas Island - List of airlines of Australia
- Clipperton Island has no airports.
- Cocos Islands - List of airlines of Australia
- Easter Island - List of airlines of Easter Island
- French Polynesia - List of airlines of French Polynesia
- Guam - List of airlines of Guam
- New Caledonia - List of airlines of New Caledonia
- Norfolk Island - List of airlines of Australia
- Northern Mariana Islands - Star Marianas Air
- Pitcairn Islands has no airports.
- Tokelau has no airports.
- Wallis and Futuna has no active airlines.

== See also ==
- List of defunct airlines of Oceania
