= List of airlines of Guam =

This is a list of airlines currently operating in Guam.

== Active ==
Airline	Image	IATA	ICAO	Callsign	Founded	Notes
Asia Pacific Airlines		P9	MGE	MAGELLAN	1999	Cargo airline.

== Defunct ==
Airline	Image	IATA	ICAO	Callsign	Founded	Ceased operations	Notes
Air Micronesia		CS	CMI	AIR MIKE	1968	1992	Rebranded as Continental Mirconesia.
Alliance Air		4G			1991	1993	
Continental Micronesia		CS	CMI	AIR MIKE	1992	2012	Rebranded as a subsidiary United Airlines after its merger. Fully absorbed by 2017.
Fly Guam					2008	2011	
Freedom Air		FP	FRE	FREEDOM	1974	2013	

== See also ==
- List of airlines of Oceania
- List of defunct airlines of Oceania
