= Nauru International Airport =

Airport in Yaren, Nauru

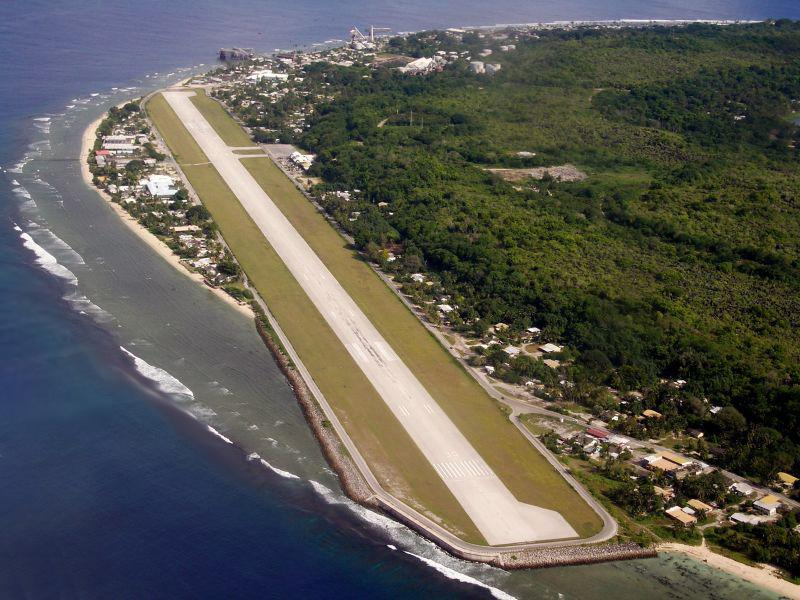
- Aerial view of the runway
- IATA: INU; ICAO: ANYN

Summary
- Airport type: Public
- Serves: Nauru
- Location: Yaren District
- Opened: January 1943; 83 years ago
- Hub for: Nauru Airlines
- Elevation AMSL: 7 m (23 ft)
- Coordinates: 00°32′50.85″S 166°55′08.76″E
- Website: www.nauruairlines.com.au

Map
- Location in Yaren district, Nauru INU/ANYN (Oceania)

Runways
Direction	Length		Surface
Direction	m	ft	Surface
12/30	2,150	7,054	Asphalt

Nauru International Airport (IATA: INU, ICAO: ANYN) is the sole airport in the island nation of Nauru, officially the Republic of Naoero, in the Central Pacific. The airport provides service to regional destinations via the national airline, Nauru Airlines.

== History ==
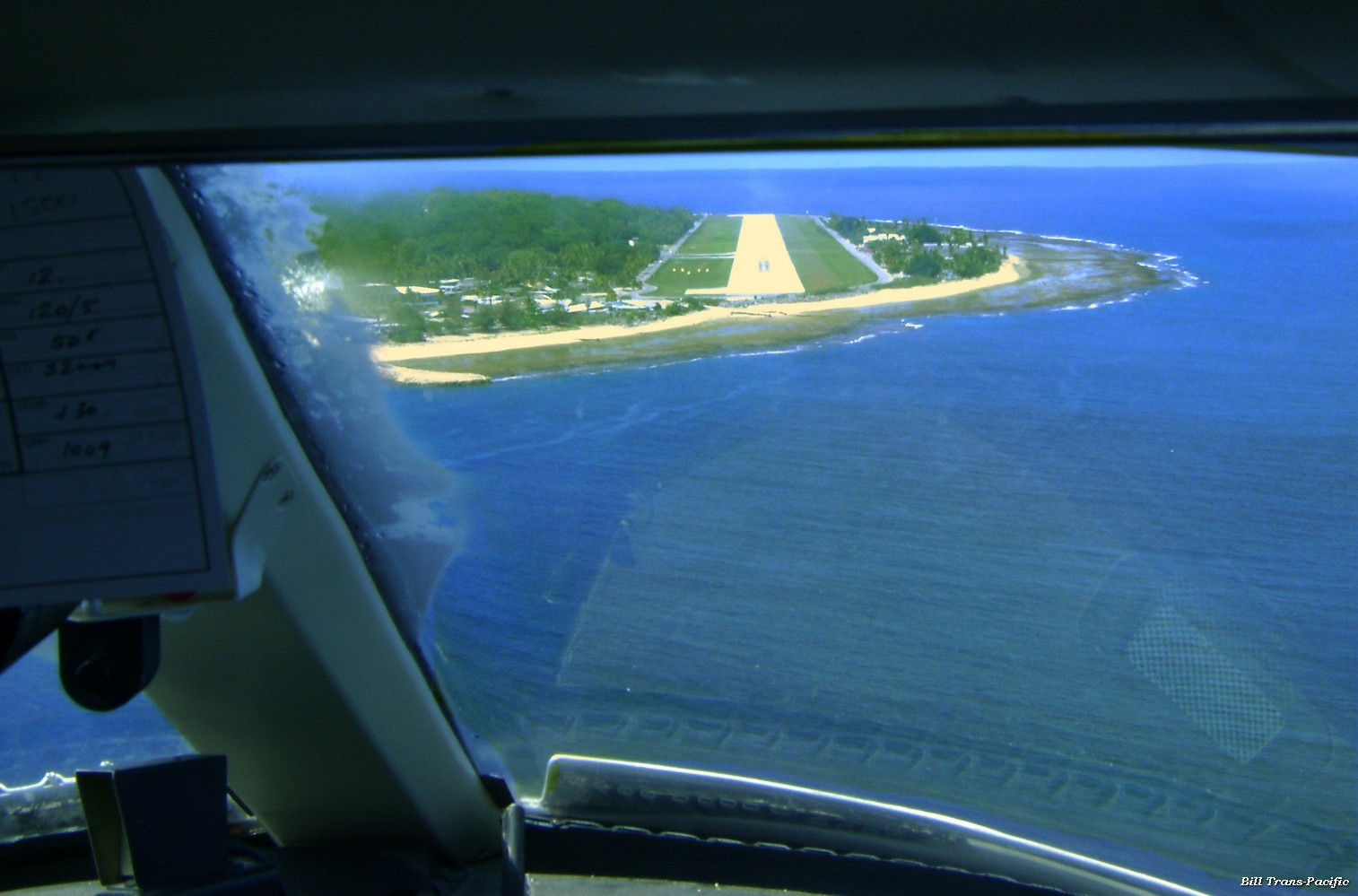
Cockpit view of aircraft on approach

The original airstrip was built during the World War II Japanese occupation of Nauru using forced labour (rōmusha). Operations began in January 1943. The airfield was attacked in 1943 and runway severely damaged by bomb runs in 1944. After the war, it was converted to a civilian airport.

The airport is located in the Yaren district, just north of many of the government buildings, including the Parliament House, police station, and a secondary school. The airport holds the head office of the flag carrier, Nauru Airlines.

Also located at the airport are the Republic of Nauru Civil Aviation Authority, tasked with airport security and operational management; the Directorate of Immigration, tasked with control of incoming and outgoing passengers, and the Nauru Customs Service.

== Terminal ==
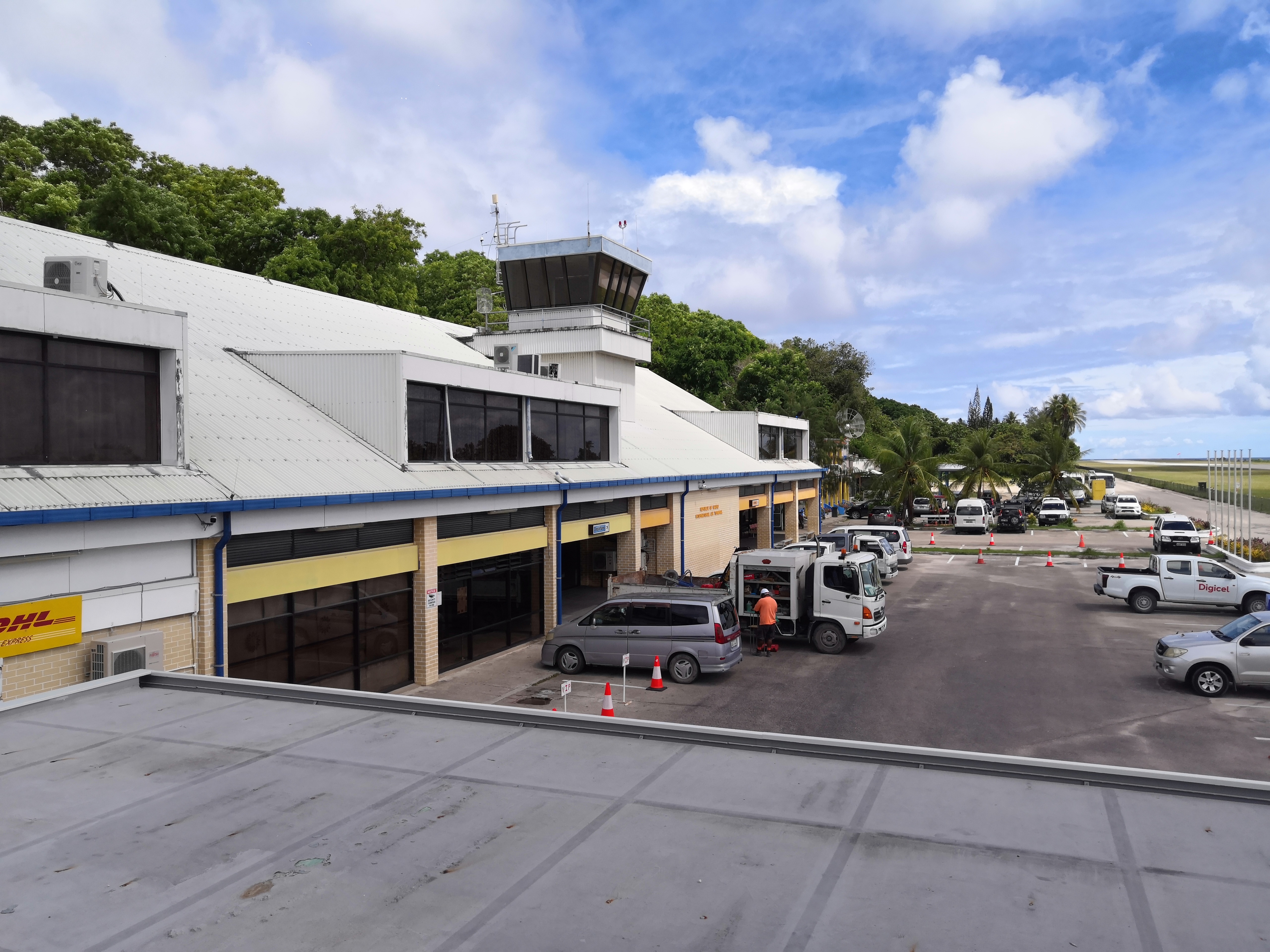
Terminal building

The single terminal has a small check-in counter, waiting areas, eatery, and gift shop on the ground floor.

== Airlines and destinations ==
Nauru International Airport serves as the main hub of the national carrier, Nauru Airlines.

Nauru Airlines connects Nauru to Australia (Brisbane Airport), Fiji (Nadi Airport and Suva Airport), the Federated States of Micronesia (Pohnpei Airport), Kiribati (Tarawa Airport), the Marshall Islands (Majuro Airport), and Palau (Koror Airport).
