= Palau Pacific Airways =

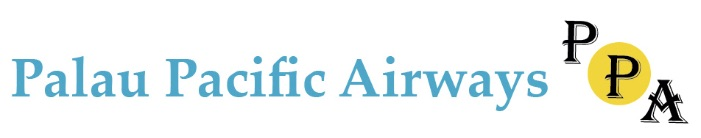
IATA	ICAO	Call sign
ED	AXE	PPA
- Founded: November 2014
- Commenced operations: November 11, 2014
- Ceased operations: 2018
- Hubs: Roman Tmetuchl International Airport
- Fleet size: 1
- Destinations: Charter
- Website: palaupacificairways.com

Palau Pacific Airways (PPA) was a charter airline from Palau.

== History ==
The airline launched scheduled charter flights between Hong Kong and its base Koror on 7 November 2014. It is often confused with Palau Airways although they are not associated with one another. The start-up intended to operate five times weekly charter services to Hong Kong Chek Lap Kok Airport. The carrier wet-leased a Boeing 737-800 aircraft on an annual contract from Slovakian Aircraft, Crew, Maintenance and Insurance (ACMI) operator: Air Explore.

Palau Pacific Airways had expanded to service Taipei, Taiwan on January 30, 2016. The airline shut down on 31 August 2018.

The airline was forced to stop its operations due to a lack of Chinese tourists after China had declared Palau an “illegal tour destination”, because Palau continues to maintain links with Taiwan.

In January 2019, the airline was rebounded as Palau Asia Pacific Air, and it serves both Macau and Hong Kong. The airline is also proposing a new destination to Taiwan Taoyuan International Airport.

== Destinations ==
Palau Pacific Airways served the following destinations:

- Palau - Roman Tmetuchl International Airport base
- Hong Kong - Hong Kong International Airport (charter)
- Macau - Macau International Airport (charter)
- Taipei - Taoyuan International Airport (charter)

== Fleet ==
Palau Pacific Airways operated the following aircraft:

Aircraft	Total	Orders	Passengers	Notes
Airbus A320-200	1	0	178	
