= Peleliu Airfield =

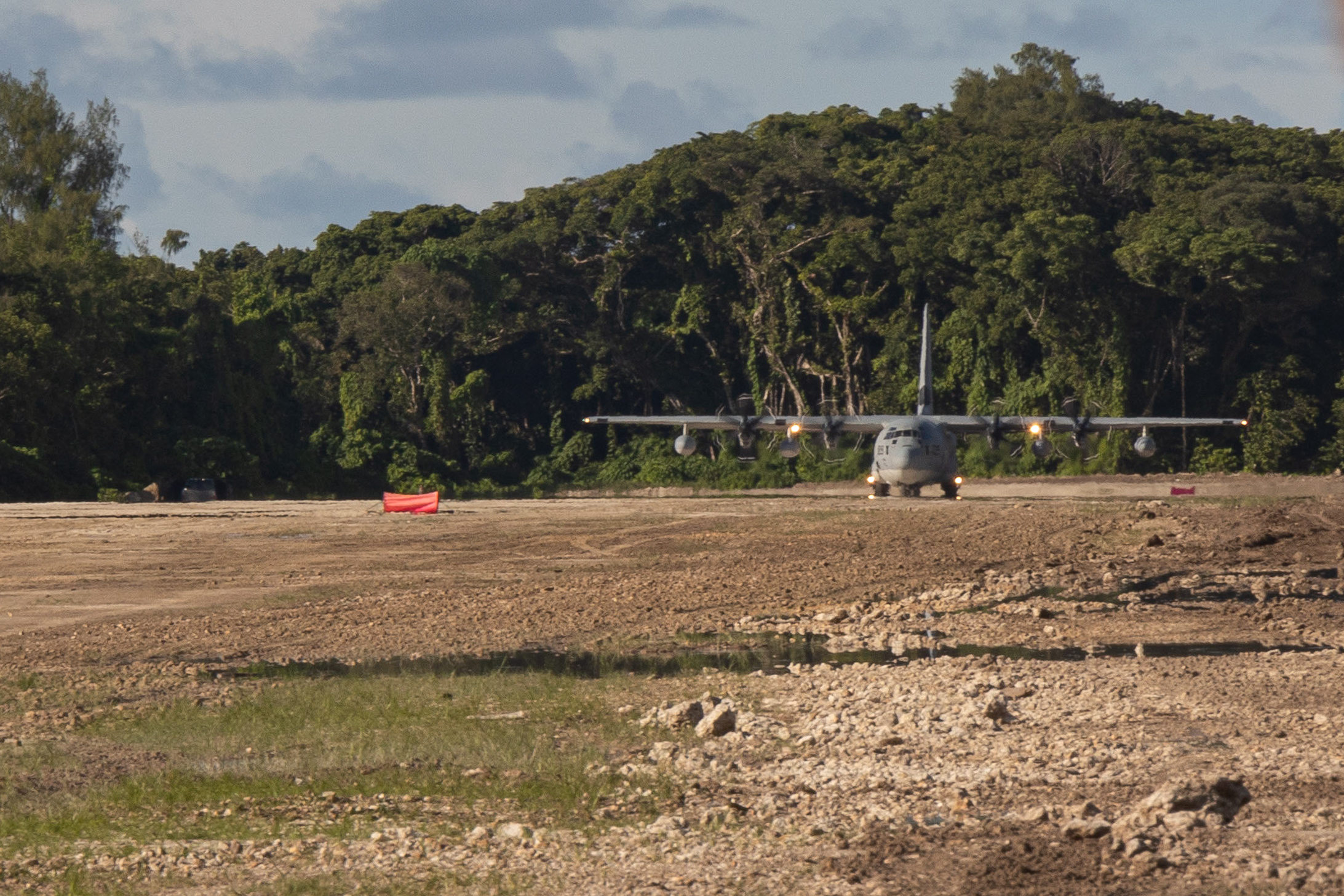
- IATA: none; ICAO: none; FAA LID: C23

Summary
- Airport type: Public
- Owner: Republic of Palau
- Location: Peleliu, Palau
- Built: 1944
- Occupants: U.S. Army Air Forces Seventh Air Force (until 1945)
- Elevation AMSL: 9 ft / 3 m
- Coordinates: 06°59′54″N 134°13′58″E

Map
- Location of the Airport in Palau

Runways
Direction	Length		Surface
Direction	ft	m	Surface
04/22	6,000	1,828	Gravel
- Source: Federal Aviation Administration

Peleliu Airfield (FAA LID: C23) is a small airfield on Peleliu, one of the islands of Palau. It also served as an airfield during World War II.

== History ==
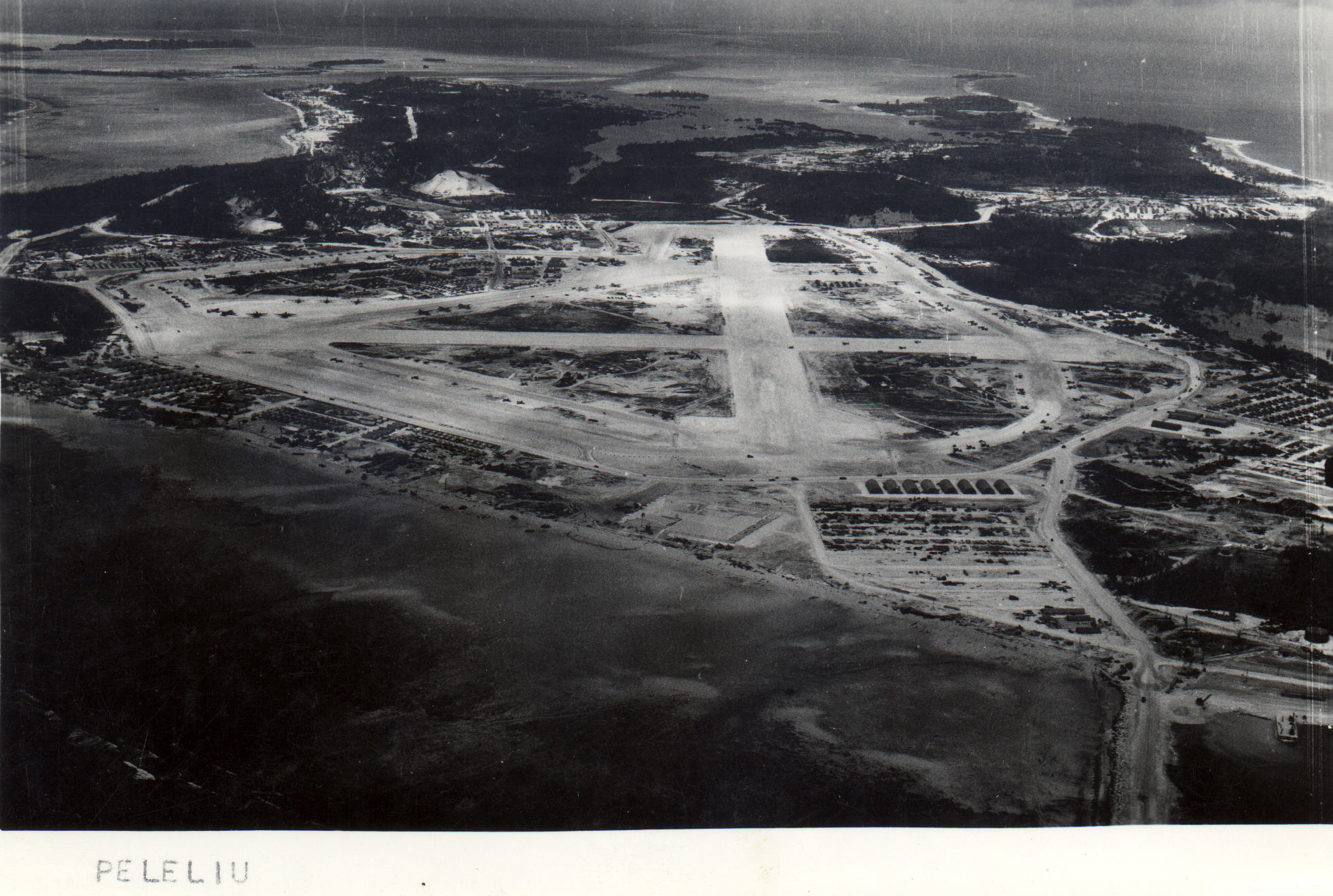
Aerial photo of Peleliu airfield, 16 March 1945

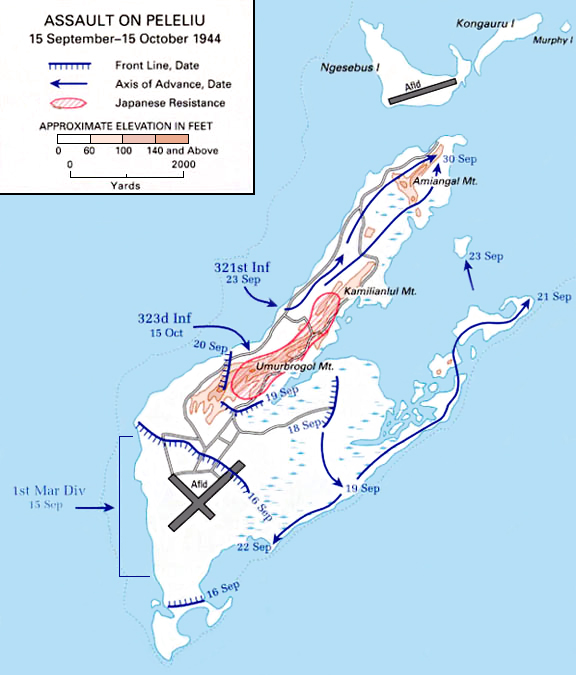
Map of the battle of Peleliu

Peleliu Airfield was built by the Japanese in 1944 with a pair of intersecting runways. During the Battle of Peleliu on 15 September 1944, 11,000 Japanese defended the island when the 1st Marine Division assaulted landing on the southwest corner of the island, just to the west of the airfield. On D+1, the 5th Marines moved to capture the airfield and push toward the eastern shore. They quickly raced across the airfield under heavy artillery fire from the highlands to the north, suffering heavy casualties in the process. After capturing the airfield, they rapidly advanced to the eastern end of Peleliu, leaving the island's southern defenders to be wiped out by the 7th Marines. This area was hotly contested by the Japanese, who still occupied numerous pillboxes. Temperatures remained around 115 °F (46 °C), and the Marines soon suffered high casualties from heat exhaustion. Further complicating their situation, the Marines' only available water supply was contaminated with oil. Still, by D+8 the 5th and 7th Marines accomplished their objectives, holding the airfield and the southern portion of the island.

Having quickly captured the airfield, Seabees from the 33rd and 73rd Naval Construction Battalions had it operational by D+3. The "Grasshoppers" (VMO-1) soon began aerial spotting missions for Marine artillery and Naval gunfire. On 26 September 1944 (D+11), the Corsairs of the VMF-114 landed on the airstrip. The Corsairs began dive-bombing missions across Peleliu, and also brought two more useful weapons to the fight against Japanese fortifications. Corsairs fired rockets, to blow open cave entrances for the infantrymen, and also delivered napalm attacks—only the second time the weapon had been used in the Pacific. The napalm proved useful, burning away vegetation hiding spider holes, and killing their occupants.

After liberation, the Seabees further repaired, expanded and upgraded the airfield. The airbase was under the command of Colonel Karl S. Day. In December 1944, the two runways measured 6,000 by 300 feet (1,829 m × 91 m) and 3,900 by 260 feet (1,189 m × 79 m). A PBY that took off from Peleliu on 3 August 1945 was the first to locate survivors of the USS Indianapolis 4 days after it was sunk.

The USAAF Seventh Air Force moved the F-5-equipped 28th Photographic Reconnaissance Squadron to Peleliu from Kwajalein on 5 October 1944 to carry out long-range photographic missions over the Philippines. The recon squadron remained until April, 1945 when it was moved northwest to Okinawa.

After the end of the war, Peleliu and its airfield were abandoned by the Americans. Today the vegetation on the island, which was largely burnt out by the battle, has regrown and has replaced the scars of war. As it had been heavily defended by the Japanese, there are still tanks, Amtracs, an A6M Zero, canteens, helmets, etc., scattered in the jungle from the war. The airfield still exists but was only usable by light aircraft until the U.S. Marine Corps rehabilitated the runway in 2024, when a KC-130 tanker made its first landing there on June 22.

== Facilities and aircraft ==
The airport resides at an estimated elevation of 9 feet (3 m) above mean sea level. It has one runway designated 4/22 with a gravel surface measuring 6,000 by 40 feet (1,828 x 12 m). For the 12-month period ending on 23 May 1987, the airport had 1,500 air taxi aircraft operations, an average of 125 per month.

== Airlines and destinations ==
=== Passenger ===
Airlines	Destinations
Belau Air	Angaur, Koror
Pacific Mission Aviation	Koror

== See also ==
- USAAF in the Central Pacific
- Peleliu Naval Base
