= Angaur Airstrip =

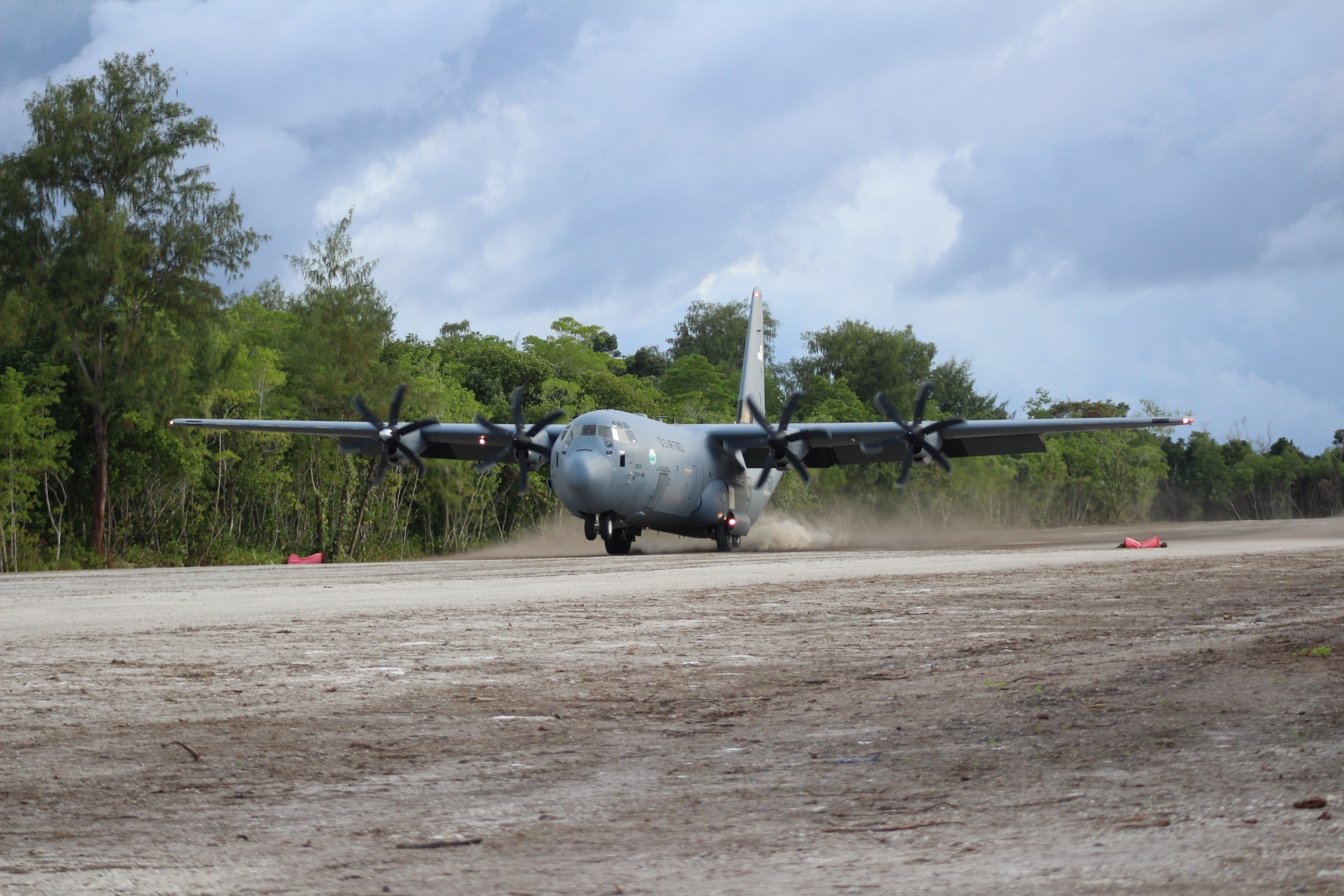
- USAF C-130 lands on Angaur Airfield, 5 September 2020
- IATA: none; ICAO: none; FAA LID: ANG

Summary
- Airport type: Public
- Owner: Republic of Palau
- Location: Angaur, Palau
- Built: 1944
- Occupants: U.S. Army Air Forces Seventh Air Force (until 1945)
- Elevation AMSL: 22 ft (6.7 m)
- Coordinates: 06°54′23″N 134°08′42″E

Map
- Location within Palau

Runways
Direction	Length		Surface
Direction	ft	m	Surface
05/23	7,000	2,133	Gravel
- Source: Federal Aviation Administration

Angaur Airstrip (Japanese: アンガウル飛行場, Hepburn: Angauru hikōjō, (FAA LID: ANG)) is a small airstrip on Angaur, one of the islands of Palau. It also served as an airfield during World War II.

== History ==
=== World War II ===
The day the island was declared secured on September 20, 1944, construction of the airfield began on the eastern edge of the island. As there was no existing airfield to build on, two Army engineering battalions had to clear jungle and level the terrain to create the airfield. On 19 October 1944 the airfield with its 7,000 feet (2,100 m) runway aligned NE/SW together with taxiways and hardstands for 120 aircraft were ready for use.

The 494th Bombardment Group operating B-24J Liberator bombers arrived at Angaur on 16 October and commenced operations on 3 November. The Wing remained at Angaur until June 1945 when it moved to Yontan Airfield on Okinawa.

The 22nd Bombardment Group operating B-24s was based at Angaur from November 1944 until January 1945 when it moved to Guiuan Airfield in the Philippines.

=== Postwar ===
In April 2010 the Palau Senate passed a resolution asking the President to offer Angaur airstrip as a site for the relocation of Marine Corps Air Station Futenma on Okinawa.

In 2020 a joint U.S. civil/military team carried out the Angaur Airfield Joint Improvement Project to improve the runway with the work completed by 27 August. The runway improvements give Palau a secondary airfield capable of handling cargo aircraft to back up to Roman Tmetuchl International Airport.

== Facilities and aircraft ==
The airport resides at an estimated elevation of 20 feet (6.1 m) above mean sea level. It has one runway designated 5/23 with a gravel surface measuring 7,000 feet (2,100 m) by 150 feet (46 m). For the 12-month period ending May 23, 1987, the airport had 1,500 air taxi aircraft operations, an average of 125 per month.

== Airlines and destinations ==
Airlines	Destinations
Belau Air	Koror, Peleliu
Pacific Mission Aviation	Koror

== See also ==
- USAAF in the Central Pacific
