= List of airlines of American Samoa =

This is a list of airlines operating in American Samoa.

== Active ==
Airline	Image	IATA	ICAO	Callsign	Founded	Notes
Pago Wings					2023	Planned

== Defunct ==
Airline	Image	IATA	ICAO	Callsign	Founded	Ceased operations	Notes
Inter Island Airways		JY	IWY	INTER ISLAND	1993	2014	
Samoa Airlines		MB			1982	1986	Operated demilitarized Douglas C-47 Skytrain-45s
Samoan Air Lines					1959	1960	Operated DC-3 from Pago Pago
South Pacific Island Airways		HK	SPI	SOUTH PACIFIC	1973	1987	

== See also ==
- List of airlines
- List of defunct airlines of Oceania
