= Peterborough/Sibson Airfield =

Airfield in Cambridgeshire, England

Peterborough/Sibson Airfield Sibson Aerodrome
- IATA: none; ICAO: EGSP

Summary
- Airport type: Private
- Operator: NSF Sibson
- Location: Peterborough, Cambridgeshire, England
- Elevation AMSL: 130 ft / 40 m
- Coordinates: 52°33′21″N 000°23′11″W

Map
- Location in Cambridgeshire

Runways
Direction	Length		Surface
Direction	m	ft	Surface
06/24	935	3,068	Grass
15/33	551	1,808	Grass

Peterborough/Sibson Airfield (ICAO: EGSP), also known as Sibson Aerodrome, is an unlicensed aerodrome located 6 NM (11 km; 6.9 mi) west of Peterborough, Cambridgeshire, England and 1 km (0.62 mi) south of Sibson.

The aerodrome was previously licensed by the CAA (Ordinary Licence number P5877) for flights for the public transport of passengers and for flying instruction as authorised by the licensee (Northamptonshire School of Flying Limited). It became unlicensed in 2013.

== Based businesses ==
Sibson Aerodrome is home to Peterborough Flying School Ltd. which is a CAA/EASA Approved Training Organisation.

The flying school operates a varied fleet of aircraft including:

- 1 x Cessna A150 (Long Range)
- 1 x Cessna A150 (Aerobat)
- 1 x Cessna A150 (Aerobat) RollsRoyce 130hp
- 1 x Cessna A150
- 1 x Piper PA28-160 Cherokee

There are many other varied types which are privately owned based at the airfield.

UK Parachuting, previously known as Skydive Sibson and more recently Skydive Airkix, is a very active parachuting centre which has used Sibson Aerodrome for many years. Jumps usually take place from a Cessna 208 aircraft, which is based at the airfield.

== Present airfield ==
The present airfield lies to the north of the original site. The original airfield lay to the south of the one surviving T1 type hangar on the airfield. Little evidence of the original site exists, as the land was returned to farming after the war.

Sibson Aerodrome is the only surviving satellite airfield of RAF Peterborough, now Westwood, Cambridgeshire.
