= No. 7 Flying Training School RAF =

Former Royal Air Force flying training school

Coordinates: 52°43′46″N 0°39′5″W

No. 7 Flying Training School
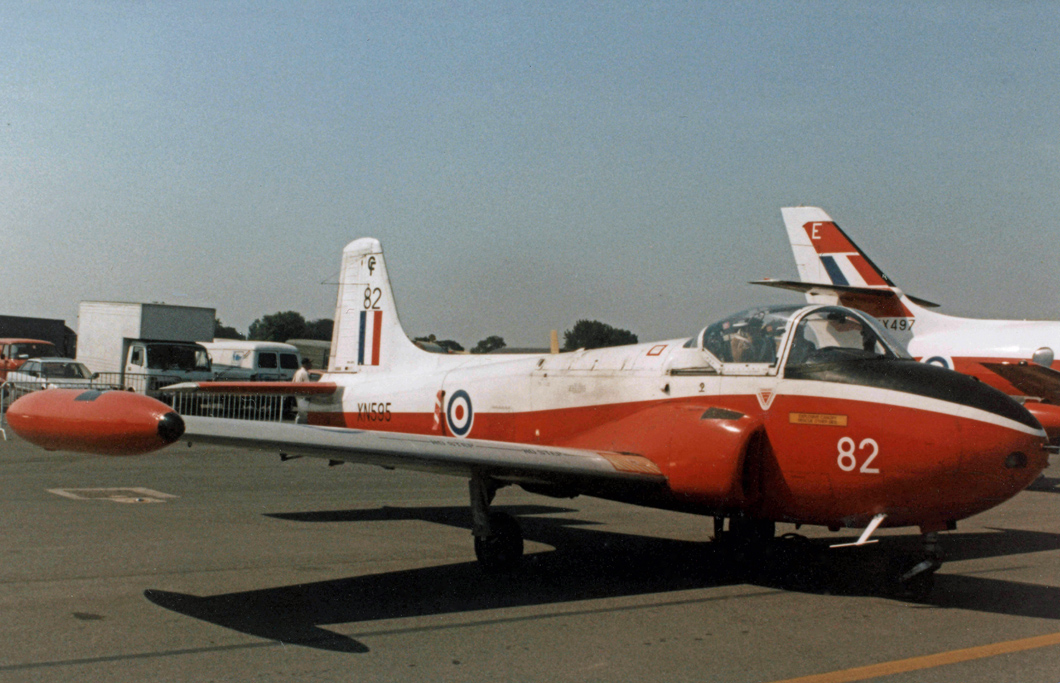
- Hunting Jet Provost T.3A XP595 of No. 7 Flying Training School in 1989
- Active: 2 Dec 1935 - 26 Aug 1940; 21 Dec 1944 - 14 Apr 1954; 1 Jun 1954 - 15 Aug 1960; 13 Mar 1962 - 30 Nov 1966; 2 Apr 1979 - 31 Mar 1992; 1 Apr 1992 – 30 Sep 1994
- Country: United Kingdom
- Branch: Royal Air Force
- Role: Pilot training

No. 7 Flying Training School (7 FTS) is a former Royal Air Force flying training school that operated between 1935 and 1994.

From 1948 to 1954, No 7 Flying Training School was located at RAF Cottesmore, flying Tiger Moths, Harvards, Prentices and Balliols.

During 1950 many improvements were made to the hangars and buildings at RAF Valley and on 1 April 1951 No. 202 Advanced Flying School was reformed at Valley, within No. 25 Group RAF, to train fighter pilots on de Havilland Vampire and Gloster Meteor jet aircraft. Vampire FB.5 and T.11 and Meteor T.7 marks were used until the unit was re-designated No. 7 Flying Training School (FTS) on 1 June 1954. On 15 August 1960 the unit was renumbered No. 4 Flying Training School RAF.

The School was based at RAF Church Fenton, Yorkshire between 1962 and 1966 and again between 1979 and 1992, equipped with Hunting/BAC Jet Provost T.3A and T.5A trainers. Its final iteration came at RAF Chivenor, Devon when 2 Tactical Weapons Unit was redesignated as 7 FTS with the BAe Hawk T.1 operated by 19(R) and 92(R) Squadrons. It was disbanded for the final time on 30 September 1994 with the closure of Chivenor as an RAF station and its transfer to the Royal Marines.

== History ==
=== First formation ===
2 Dec 1935 - Aug 1940

The flying training school was formed on 2 December 1935 at RAF Peterborough under No. 23 Group RAF, using Avro Tutors, Hawker Harts, Hawker Audaxs and Hawker Furys until 3 September 1939 when after the outbreak of the Second World War the school was renamed to No. 7 Service Flying Training School RAF. The Advanced Training Squadron of the school for armament training was detached to various airfields for training. RAF Sibson was briefly used as a relief landing ground. The school moved to Canada to become No. 31 Service Flying Training School, Canada RAF from 26 August 1940.

=== Second formation ===
21 Dec 1944 – 14 Apr 1954

The school was reformed on 21 December 1944 as No. 7 SFTS at Peterborough from the disbanded No. 7 (Pilots) Advanced Flying Unit RAF with a relief landing ground at Sibson, a satellite airfield at RAF Sutton Bridge and a detachment at RAF Calveley. Their flew North American Harvards, Airspeed Oxfords & Avro Ansons. The school moved to RAF Kirton-in-Lindsey on 15 April 1946 and reverting to its original name on 1 January 1948 with the unit receiving de Havilland Tiger Moths and Percival Prentices. The unit moved to RAF Cottesmore on 16 April 1948 as part of No. 23 Group using RAF Wittering, RAF Woolfox Lodge and RAF Spitalgate as relief landing grounds. The Boulton Paul Balliol replaced the Harvard during February 1952 and the unit was disbanded on 14 April 1954.

=== Third formation ===
1 Jun 1954 – 15 Aug 1960

The unit was reformed at RAF Valley on 1 June 1954 using the assets of No. 202 Advanced Flying School RAF still under 23 Group. The school flew de Havilland Vampires and Gloster Meteors and used RAF Mona as a relief landing ground. The school was transferred to No. 25 Group RAF on 1 January 1957 and was renumbered as No. 4 Flying Training School RAF on 15 August 1960.

=== Fourth formation ===
13 Mar 1962 – 30 Nov 1966

The school was reformed at RAF Church Fenton on 13 March 1962 as No. 7 (Basic) Advanced Flying School RAF as part of 23 Group. The unit flew BAC Jet Provosts and Vampires, using RAF Elvington as a relief landing ground. The unit was disbanded on 30 November 1966 with the Vampire element moving to No. 3 Flying Training School RAF.

=== Fifth formation ===
2 Apr 1979 – 31 Mar 1992

The unit was reformed at Church Fenton again using Elvington as a RLG and flying Jet Provosts until 31 March 1992 when the unit was disbanded.

=== Sixth formation ===
1 Apr 1992 – 30 Sep 1994

The unit formed for the last time on 1 April 1992 at RAF Chivenor using the assets of No. 2 Tactical Weapons Unit RAF with Nos. 63 & 151 Shadow Squadrons flying the British Aerospace Hawk while under RAF Support Command control. The shadow squadrons were renumbered No. 19 Squadron RAF and No. 92 Squadron RAF on 1 September 1992 and the unit was finally disbanded in October 1994.

== Related units ==
- History of No. 31 Service Flying Training School, Canada RAF

The school was formed on 10 September 1940 at RCAF Station Kingston, Kingston, Ontario, Canada with Fairey Battles and Harvards using Gananoque and Sandhurst as relief landing grounds, before the unit was disbanded on 14 August 1944.

- History of No. 7 (Pilots) Advanced Flying Unit RAF

The unit was formed at Peterborough on 1 June 1942 under No. 21 Group with Miles Masters, Ansons, Hawker Hurricanes and Oxfords. The unit used relief landing grounds at RAF Sibson, RAF Horsey Toll, RAF Sutton Bridge, RAF Polebrook and RAF Kings Cliffe.

- History of No. 202 Advanced Flying School RAF

The school was formed on 15 March 1947 from No. 21 OTU at RAF Finningley under No. 91 Group with Vickers Wellingtons until 1 December 1947 when it was disbanded into No. 201 Advanced Flying School RAF. The school was reformed on 1 April 1951 at RAF Valley under No. 23 using Vampires and Meteors until it became 7 FTS on 1 June 1954.

- History of No. 2 Tactical Weapons Unit RAF

The unit was formed on 31 July 1978 at RAF Lossiemouth with Hawker Hunters and Jet Provosts until 1 April 1981 when it was disbanded. The unit was reformed from the Chivenor detachment of No. 1 Tactical Weapons Unit as part of No. 11 Group RAF which included No. 63 Squadron RAF. No. 151 Squadron RAF joined during September 1981 and was disbanded while under the command of RAF Strike Command on 1 April 1992 to become 7 FTS.

- History of the Refresher Flying Flight

The unit was reformed during April 1984.
