= RAF Sibson =

Former RAF Base in Cambridgeshire, England

RAF Sibson
- Near Sibson, Cambridgeshire in England

Site information
- Type: Royal Air Force satellite station
- Owner: Air Ministry
- Operator: Royal Air Force
- Controlled by: RAF Flying Training Command

Location
- Shown within Cambridgeshire RAF Sibson (the United Kingdom)
- Coordinates: 52°32′53″N 0°23′13″W

Site history
- Built: 1940
- In use: July 1940 - 1 October 1946
- Battles/wars: European theatre of World War II

Airfield information
Runways
Direction	Length and surface
00/00	Grass
00/00	Grass

Royal Air Force Sibson or more simply RAF Sibson is a former Royal Air Force satellite station located in Sibson, Cambridgeshire, England, west of Peterborough.

The following units were here at some point:

- No. 2 Central Flying School RAF
- No. 7 (Pilots) Advanced Flying Unit RAF
- No. 7 Service Flying Training School RAF
- No. 13 Elementary Flying Training School RAF
- No. 25 (Polish) Elementary Flying Training School RAF
- No. 2859 Squadron RAF Regiment
- No. 4183 Anti-Aircraft Flight RAF Regiment
