= Asia Pacific Airlines (Guam) =

Cargo airline of the United States

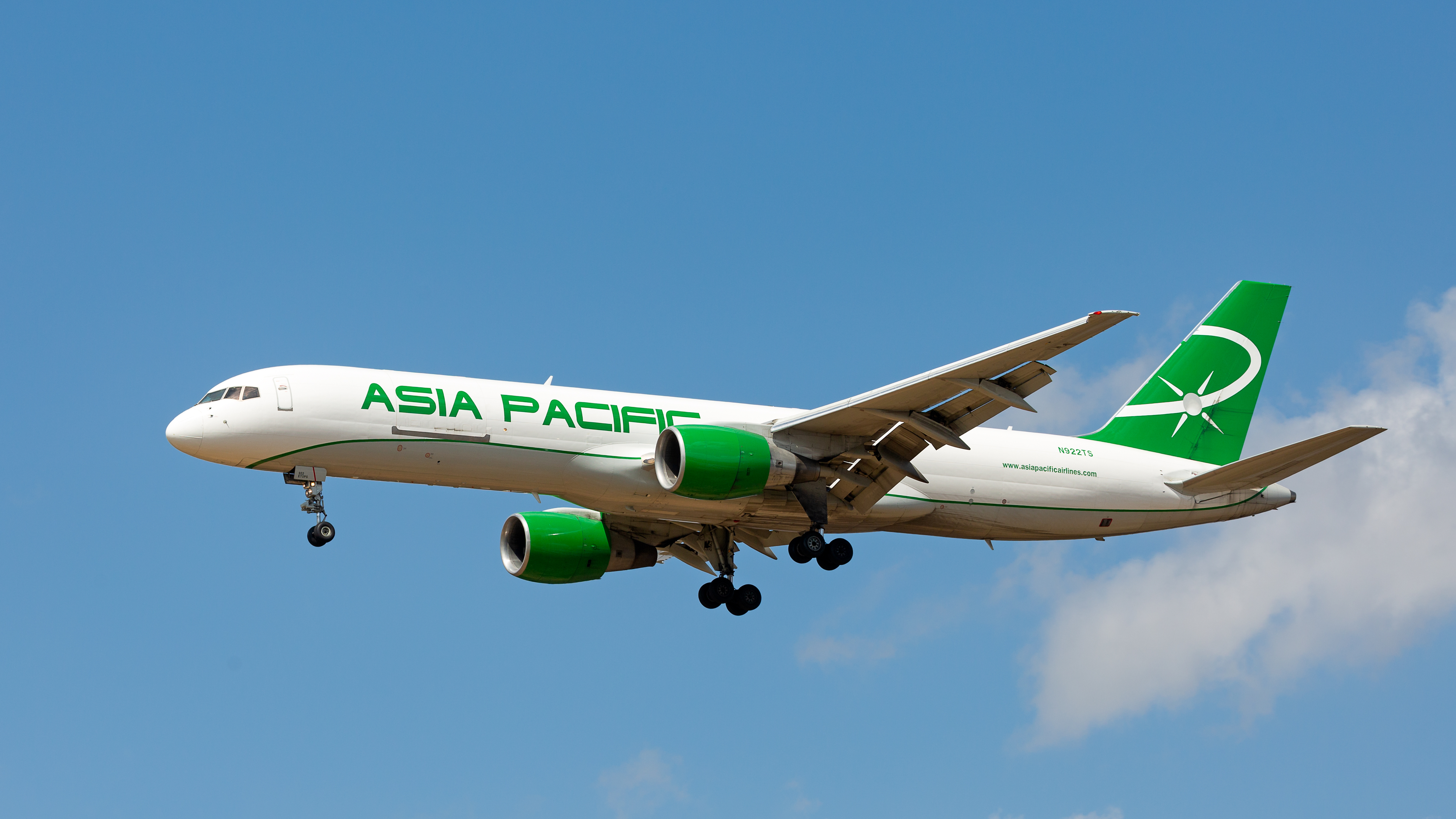
IATA	ICAO	Call sign
P9	MGE	MAGELLAN
- Founded: June 5, 1998; 28 years ago
- Commenced operations: June 3, 1999; 27 years ago
- AOC #: I5PA400I
- Operating bases: Guam; Honolulu
- Fleet size: 5
- Destinations: 12
- Parent company: Tan Holdings Corporation
- Headquarters: Tamuning, Guam, U.S.
- Website: www.asiapacificairlines.com

Asia Pacific Airlines is a cargo airline headquartered in Tamuning, Guam, United States. It operates cargo charter services from Guam and Honolulu. Its main base is Antonio B. Won Pat International Airport.

== History ==
The airline was established on June 5, 1998, and started operations with the Boeing 727-200 on June 3, 1999. It was formed as Aero Micronesia, Inc. and is an affiliate company of the Tan Holdings Corporation. The primary aspect of the airline's operation was transport for the US Postal Service, and other cargo, throughout Micronesia, as well as the importation of fresh high grade tuna for transshipment to worldwide fish markets.

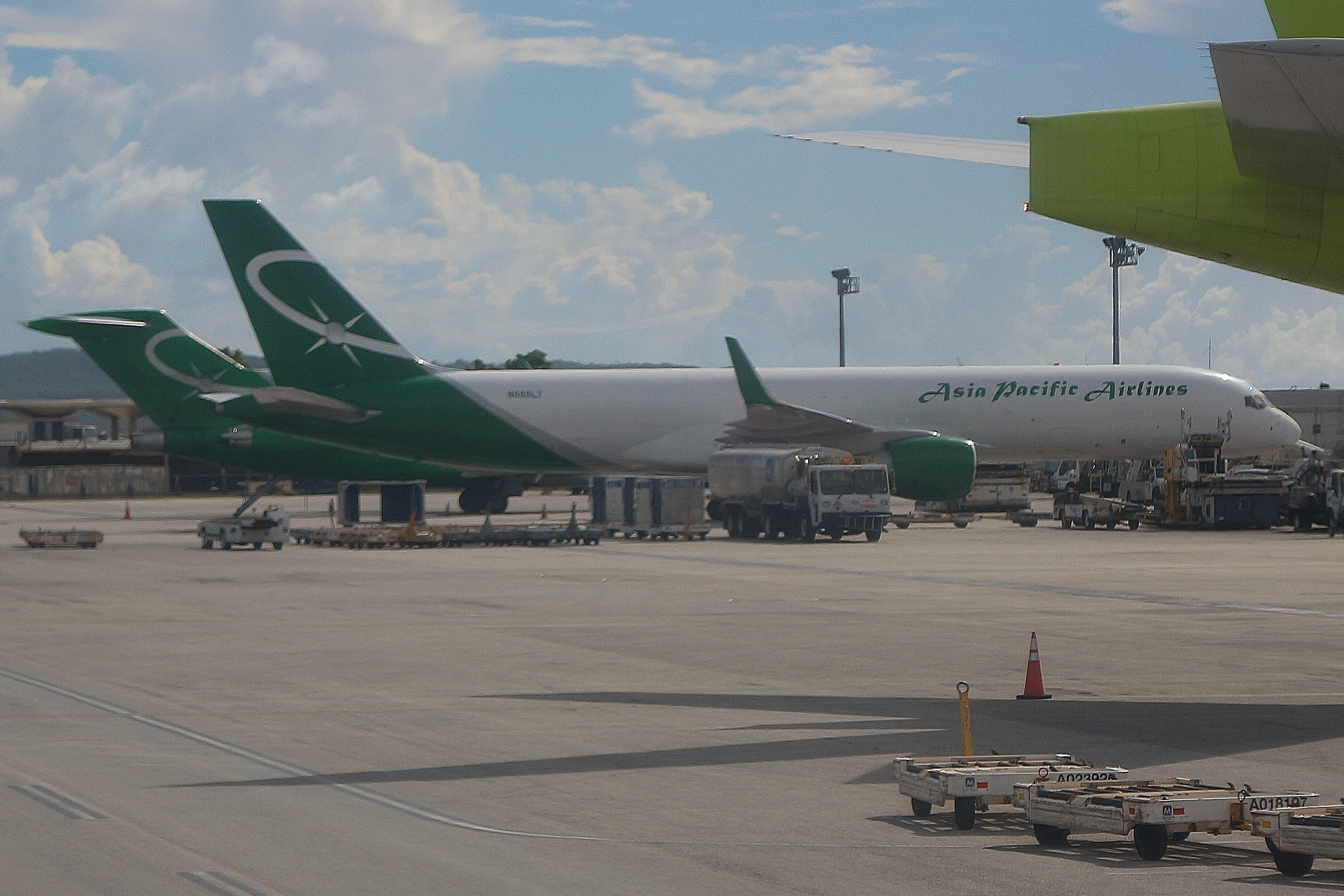
Boeing 757-200F

As of January 2015, the airline had begun the process of bringing the Boeing 757-200 into service as part of fleet modernization and expansion.

In February 2023, the Federal Aviation Administration suspended the operating authority of the airline, after they "failed to produce records showing that the two individuals who provide proficiency checks for company pilots were properly trained and qualified for the past two years," making any approvals of the airline's pilots invalid. The grounding led to supply chain disruptions across Micronesia, particularly in the Marshall Islands, where the airline was the sole air cargo carrier. Mail disruptions and shortages of medical supplies were reported, leading to state of emergency being declared by President David Kabua. The airline resumed operations on May 5, 2023.

== Destinations ==
Asia Pacific Airlines flies to the following destinations:

Country	City	Airport	Notes
American Samoa	Pago Pago	Pago Pago International Airport	
Guam	Hagåtña	Antonio B. Won Pat International Airport	Hub
Federated States of Micronesia	Pohnpei	Pohnpei International Airport	
Federated States of Micronesia	Weno	Chuuk International Airport	
Federated States of Micronesia	Kosrae	Kosrae International Airport	
Federated States of Micronesia	Yap	Yap International Airport	
Marshall Islands	Kwajalein	Bucholz Army Airfield	
Marshall Islands	Majuro	Marshall Islands International Airport	
Palau	Koror	Roman Tmetuchl International Airport	
Philippines	Manila	Ninoy Aquino International Airport	
United States	Greensboro/High Point	Piedmont Triad International Airport	
United States	Honolulu	Daniel K. Inouye International Airport	Hub
United States	Ontario	Ontario International Airport	
United States	Portland	Portland International Airport	
United States	Seattle	King County International Airport	
United States	Spokane	Spokane International Airport	

== Fleet ==
=== Current fleet ===
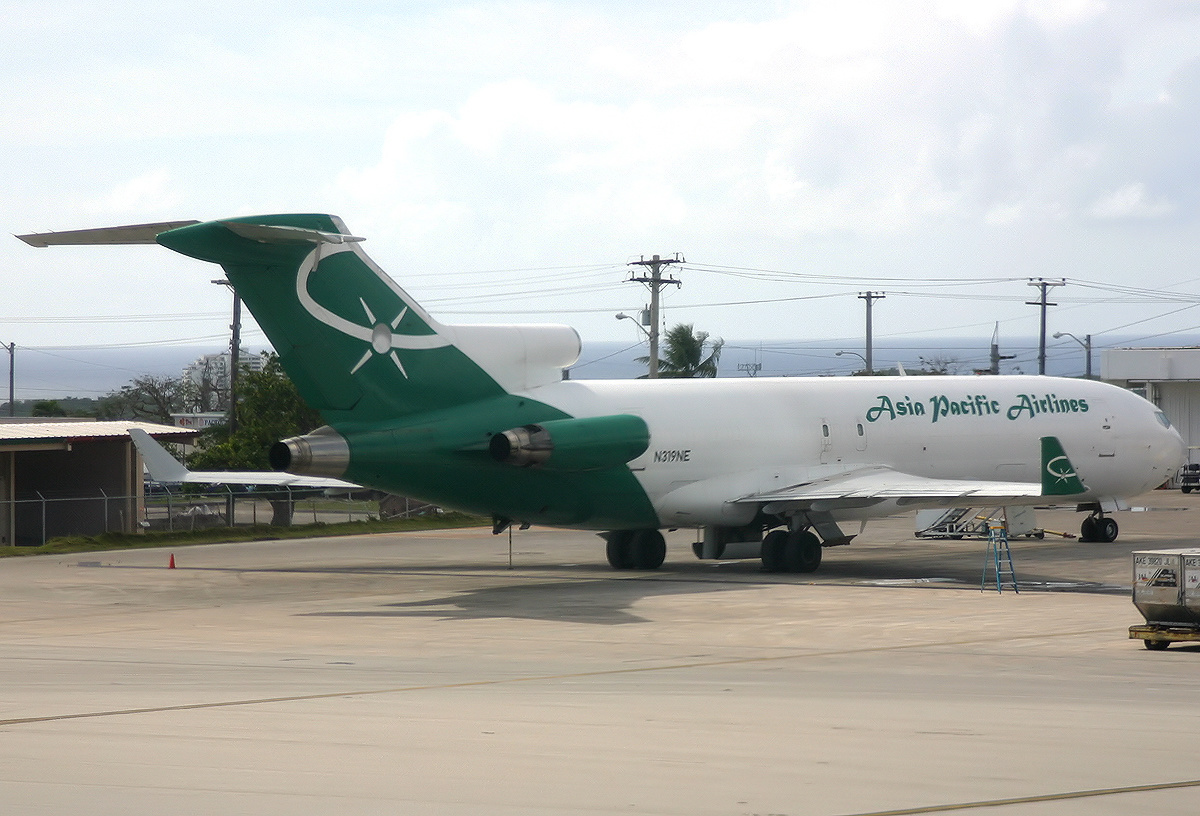
A former Asia Pacific Airlines Boeing 727-200F parked in Guam

As of July 2026, Asia Pacific Airlines operates the following aircraft:

Asia Pacific Airlines fleet
Aircraft	In service	Orders	Notes
Boeing 757-200PCF	4	—	
Boeing 757-200PF	1	—	
Total	5	—	

=== Former fleet ===
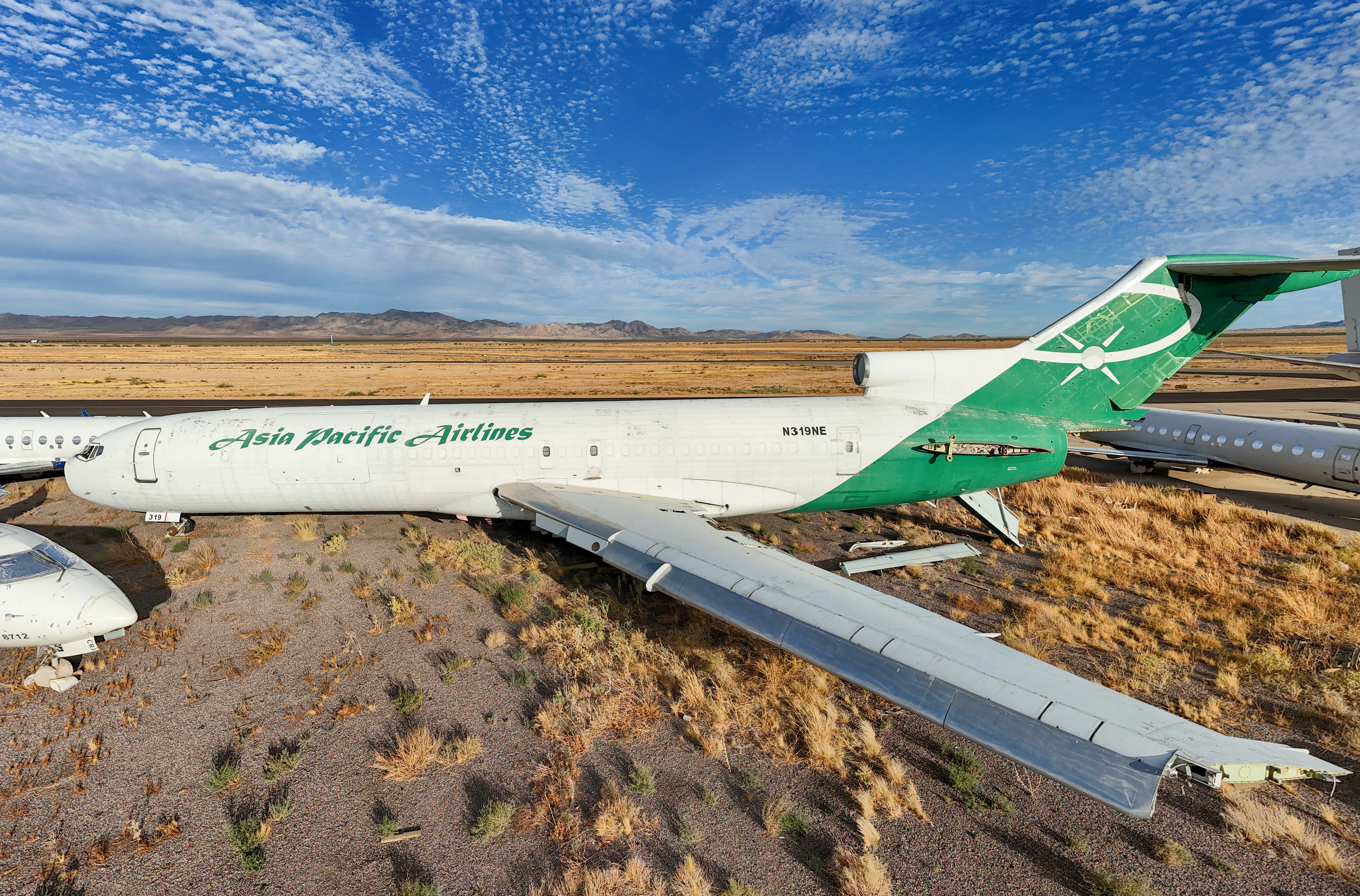
The same former Asia Pacific Airlines Boeing 727-200F stored in Kingman, AZ

As of August 2025, Asia Pacific Airlines operated 3 Boeing 757-200PCF and 1 Boeeing 757-200PF

The airline also previously operated the following aircraft as of August 2016:

- 2 Boeing 727-200F
- 1 Boeing 727-200F Super27
- 1 Boeing 757-200

== Accidents and incidents ==
- On February 26, 2016, a Boeing 727-200F (registered N86425) landed in Antonio B. Won Pat International Airport from Guam to Pohnpei without a nose wheel landing gear.

== See also ==
- List of airlines of the United States
