= RAF Peterborough =

Former Royal Air Force installation in Cambridgeshire, England

RAF Peterborough
- Peterborough, Cambridgeshire in England
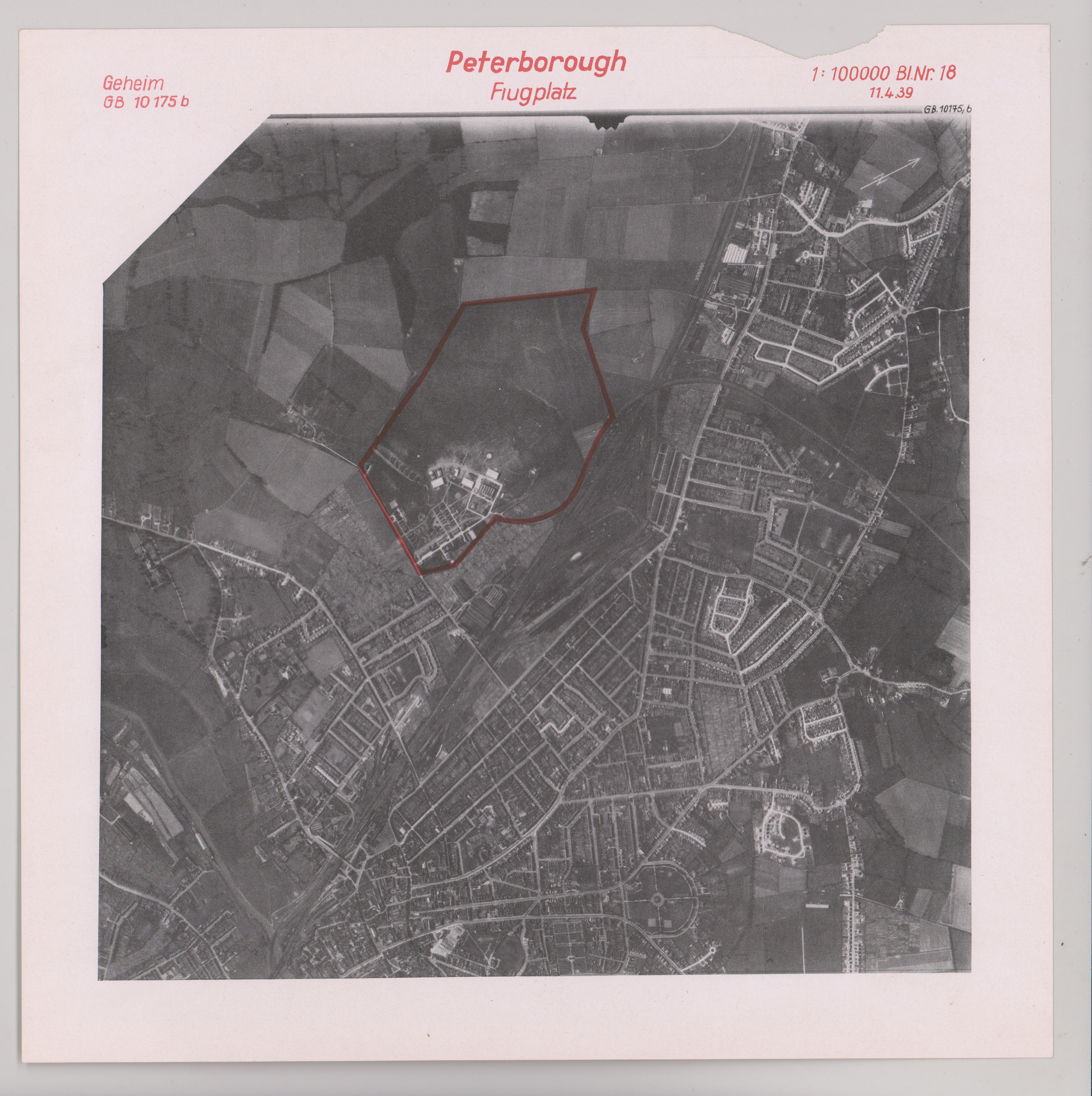
- RAF Peterborough on a target dossier of the German Luftwaffe, 1939

Site information
- Type: Royal Air Force installation
- Owner: Ministry of Defence
- Operator: Royal Air Force

Location
- Shown within Cambridgeshire
- Coordinates: 52°35′19″N 000°16′53″W

Site history
- Built: 1932
- In use: 1932-1964

Airfield information
- Elevation: 24 metres (79 ft) AMSL

Royal Air Force Peterborough or more simply RAF Peterborough is a former Royal Air Force installation in Cambridgeshire located 2 miles (3.2 km) northwest of Peterborough city centre and 9.4 miles (15.1 km) southeast of Stamford, Lincolnshire, England.

== History ==
The following units were here at some point:

- No. 1 Aircraft Storage Unit RAF
- No. 1 Pupil Pilots Pool RAF
- No. 7 Flying Training School RAF
- No. 7 (Pilots) Advancing Flying Unit RAF
- No. 7 Service Flying Training School RAF
- No. 17 Elementary Flying Training School RAF
- No. 25 (Polish) Elementary Flying Training School RAF

== Current use ==
The site is currently used for industrial work, and HMP Peterborough prison.

== See also ==
- List of former Royal Air Force stations
