= Palau Micronesia Air =

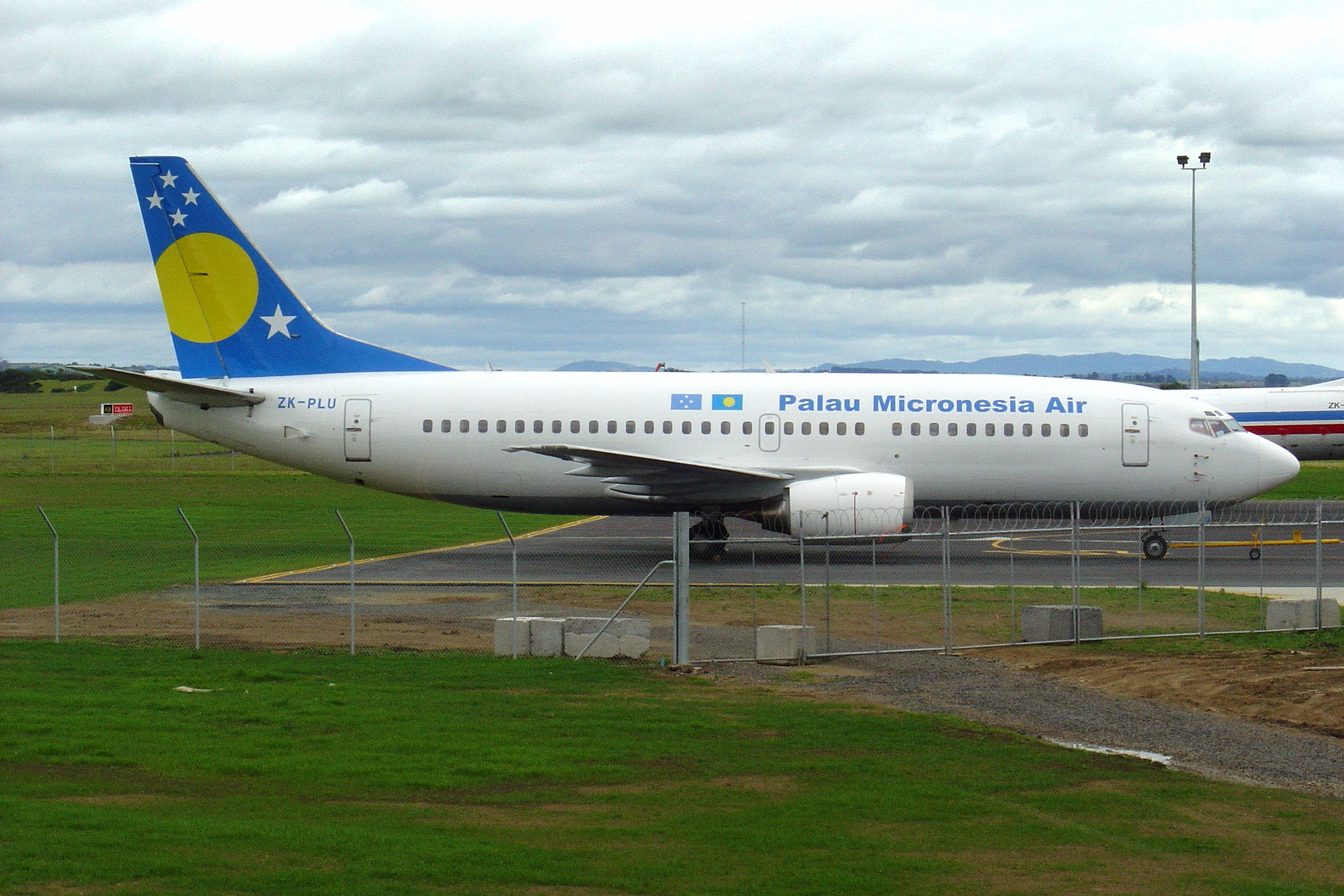
- Palau Micronesia Air Boeing 737 at Auckland Airport, January 2005
IATA	ICAO	Call sign
-	-	-
- Founded: September 2002
- Ceased operations: 23 December 2004
- Fleet size: See Fleet below
- Destinations: See Services below -->
- Headquarters: Palau

Palau Micronesia Air was an airline based in Palau. It operated services under the Air New Zealand air operators certificate. It suspended operations in December 2004.

== History ==
The airline was established in September 2002. In October 2003 Air New Zealand reached an understanding with Palau Micronesia Air committing to provide a range of support services for the new company, including operating its aircraft under the Air New Zealand air operators certificate. Operations started on 5 August 2004. It suspended operations on 23 December 2004, attributing it to high costs and under-performing sales.

== Services ==
It served Palau, Guam, Saipan, Micronesia, Australia and the Philippines. It was the first airline to provide direct service between Palau and Australia.
