= Norfolk Jet Express =

Airline of Norfolk Island, Australia (1997–2005)

IATA	ICAO	Call sign
YE	—	—
- Founded: May 1997
- Ceased operations: 7 June 2005
- Headquarters: Norfolk Island, Australia
- Key people: Gregg Prechelt (CEO); David Bobberman (COO)

Norfolk Jet Express Pty Ltd was an airline based on Norfolk Island offering scheduled, international, domestic, passenger and cargo services. It ceased operations in June 2005 due to financial difficulties.

== History ==
Norfolk Jet Express was established in May 1997 by Norfolk Island resident and businessman Gregg Prechelt. It started operations in the same month and ceased on 7 June 2005 after voluntary liquidation.

== Services ==
Norfolk Jet Express provided services from Norfolk Island to Brisbane and Sydney using the Air Nauru Boeing 737-400 and Alliance Airlines Fokker 100 aircraft to Auckland at one stage.

== Fleet ==
The aircraft fleet firstly consisted of just one single BAe 146-100 then progressed to a Fokker 100 (wet-leased from Alliance Airlines) and a Boeing 737-400 (leased from Air Nauru).

== See also ==
- List of defunct airlines of Australia
- Aviation in Australia
