= List of airlines of the Cook Islands =

This is a list of airlines of the Cook Islands.

== Current airlines ==
| Airline | IATA | ICAO | Callsign | Image | Founded |
|---|---|---|---|---|---|
| Air Rarotonga | GZ | RAR | | | 1978 |

== Defunct airlines ==
| Airline | IATA | ICAO | Image | Callsign | Commenced operations | Ceased operations | Notes |
|---|---|---|---|---|---|---|---|
| Cook Islands International | | | | COOKISLAND | 1986 | 1992 | |
