= Belau Air =

Palauan airline

IATA	ICAO	Call sign
-	-	BELAU
- Founded: 1989
- Hubs: Roman Tmetuchl International Airport
- Fleet size: 1
- Destinations: 3
- Headquarters: Koror City, Koror, Palau
- Website: http://www.underwatercolours.com/belauair/

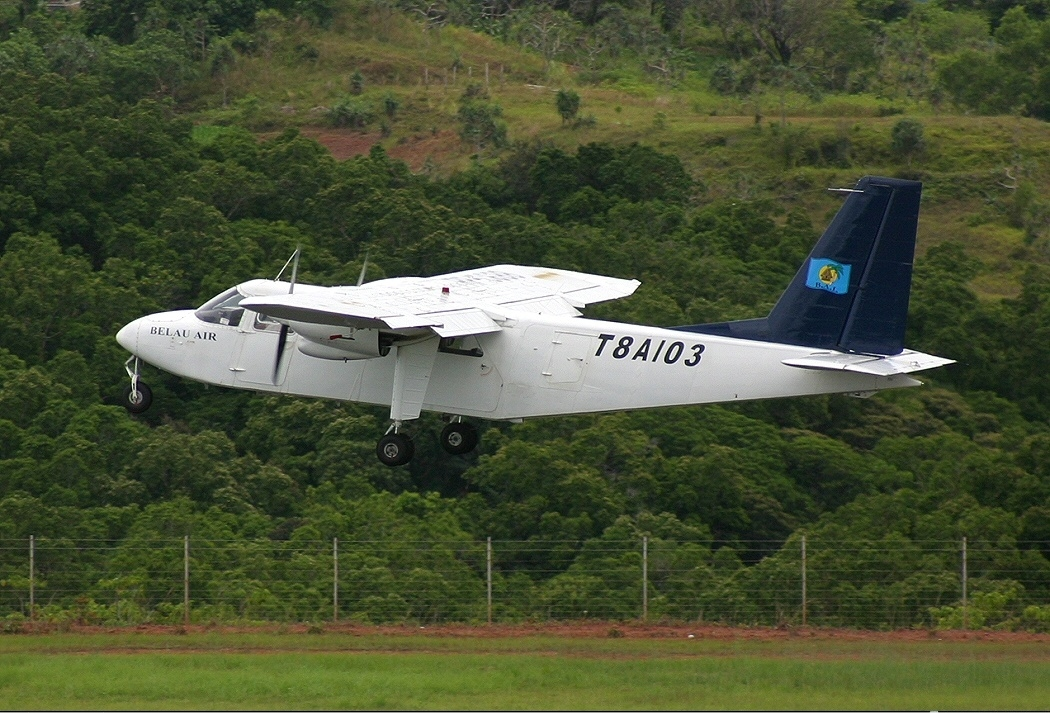
Islander of Belau Air in 2004

Belau Air, Inc. is a Palauan airline with its headquarters in Koror City. Belau Air is the only air carrier operating solely throughout the island nation of Palau, having its hub at Roman Tmetuchl International Airport in the state of Airai nearby the country's main city and former capital Koror. Belau Air currently owns only one small plane, a modified Cessna 206, which can hold up to five passengers. The service makes daily flights to the Palauan states of Peleliu and Angaur, both of which are small island communities southwest of the State of Koror. The plane is also used for tourism and offers tours throughout Palau's Rock Islands. The airline does not travel internationally, and other airlines are used to travel into and out of Palau. The Airline provides a Shuttle Service to transport passengers from the Roman Tmetuchl International Airport in Airai to Koror.

== Destinations ==
Country	City	Airport
Palau	Angaur	Angaur Airstrip
Palau	Koror	Roman Tmetuchl International Airport ^{[Hub]}
Palau	Peleliu	Peleliu Airfield
