= Nauru Airlines =

Flag carrier of Nauru

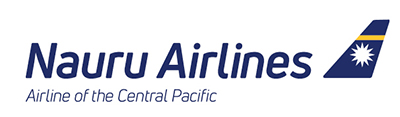

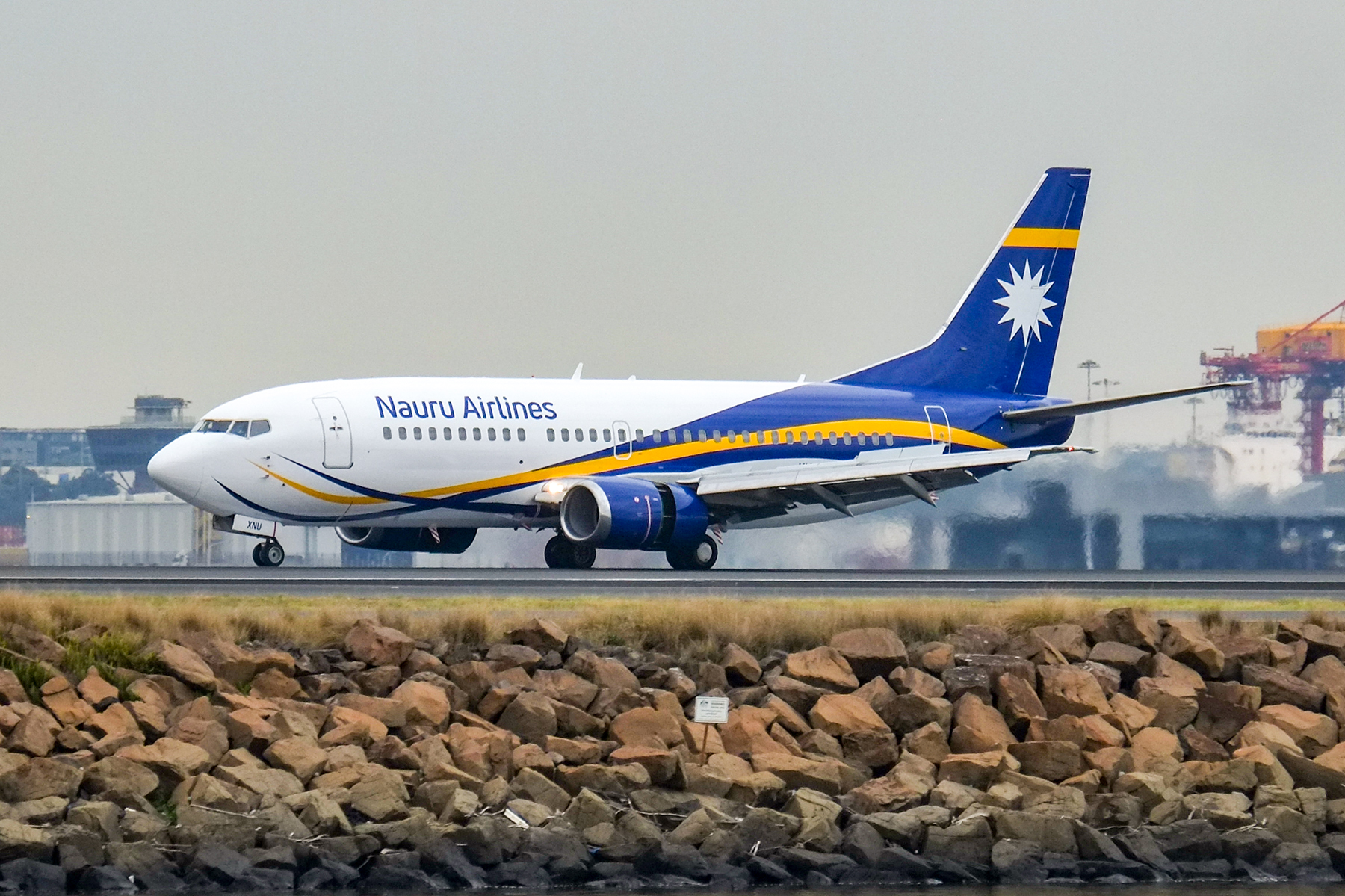
| IATA | ICAO | Call sign |
|---|---|---|
| ON | RON | AIR NAURU |
- Founded: 17 September 1969; 57 years ago (as Air Nauru)
- Commenced operations: 14 February 1970; 56 years ago
- Hubs: Nauru International Airport
- Fleet size: 7
- Destinations: 10 (2026)
- Headquarters: Nauru International Airport; Yaren District, Nauru
- Key people: Ingo Eoe (CEO)
- Website: www.nauruair.com

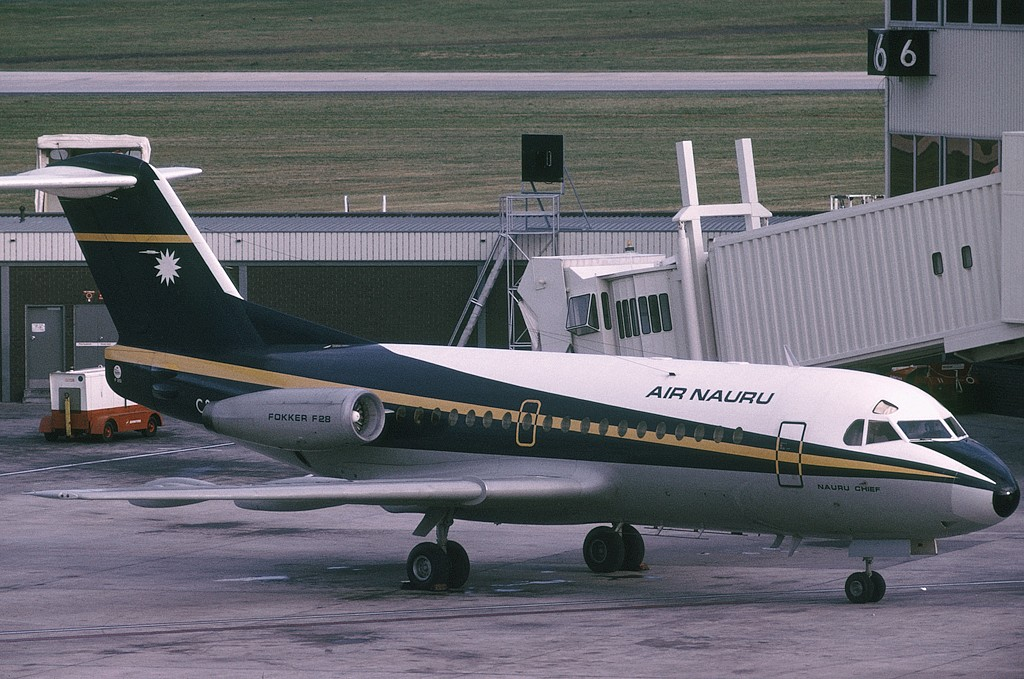
Air Nauru Fokker F28 Fellowship at Melbourne Airport, Australia (1973)

Nauru Air Corporation, trading as Nauru Airlines (formerly trading as Our Airline and Air Nauru), is the flag carrier of Nauru, officially the Republic of Naoero. It operates scheduled international services to other Pacific islands and Australia. Its main base is Nauru International Airport. Its head office is on the premises of Nauru International Airport, Yaren District and its operations office is in Brisbane in the Australian state of Queensland. In August 2014, the airline changed its name from Our Airline to Nauru Airlines.

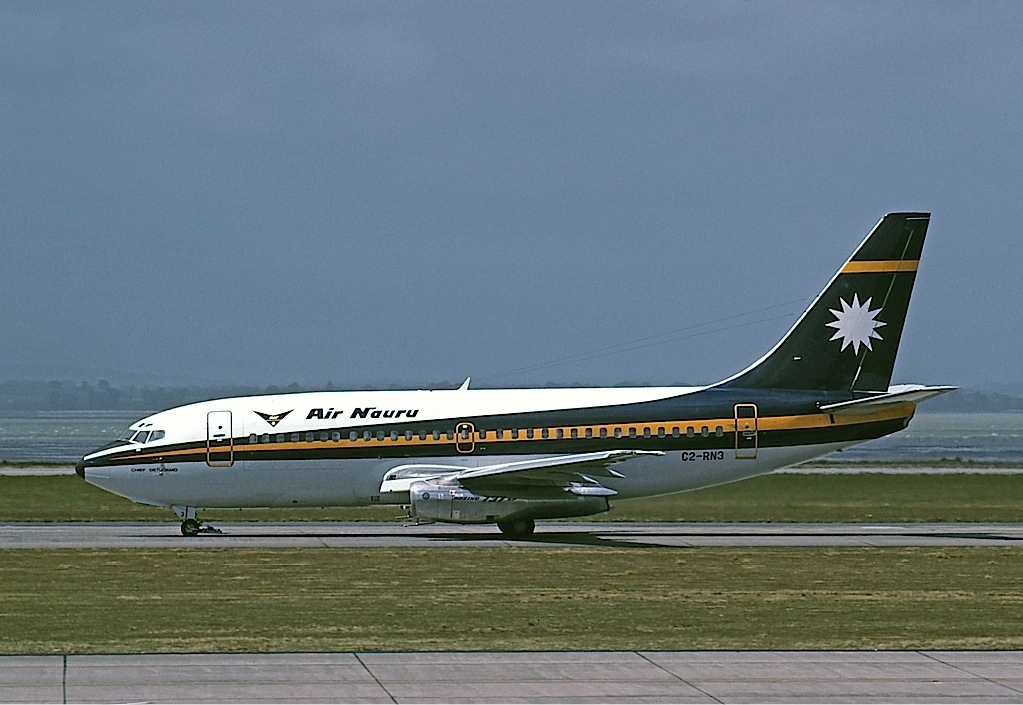
Air Nauru 737-200 (1985)

== History ==
Former Air Nauru logo

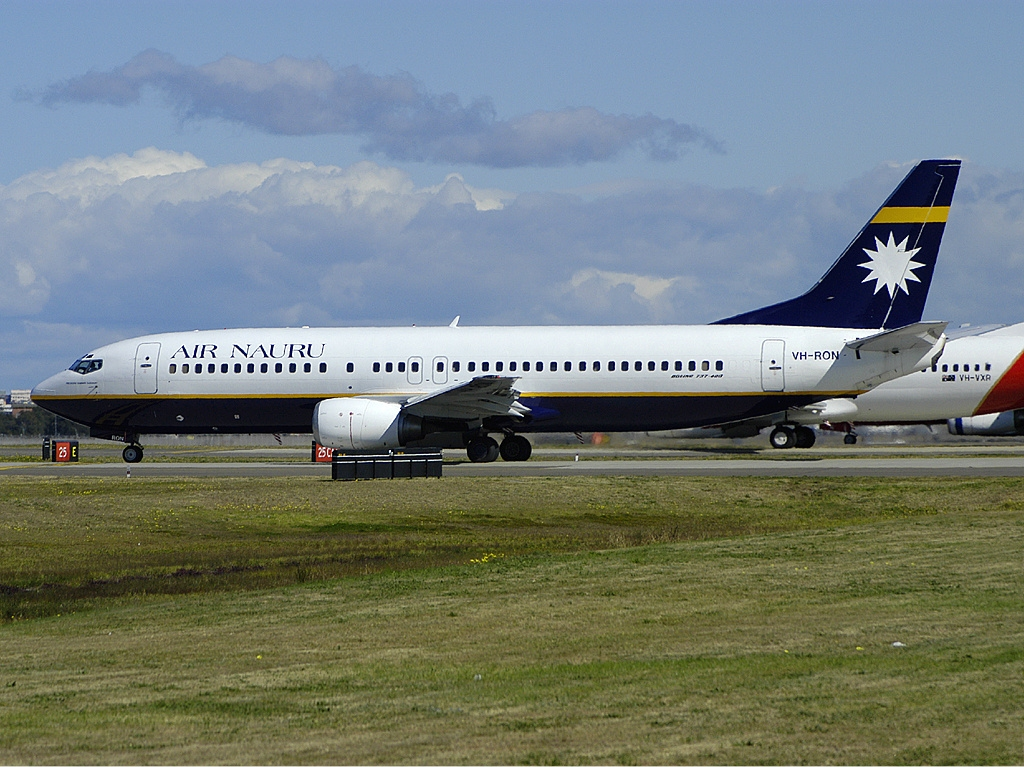
Air Nauru Boeing 737-400 at Sydney Airport, Australia (2003)

Nauru Airlines was established as Air Nauru on 17 September 1969, and started operations on 14 February 1970. Regular scheduled services commenced after the delivery in January 1972 of the airline's first Fokker F28 Fellowship twin jet, which was followed by a second. A Boeing 737-200C was added to the fleet in 1975 and a Boeing 727-100 entered service on 16 June 1976. Later in the 1970s, the two Fellowships were sold and more Boeings were added to the fleet.

By 1983, the fleet included seven aircraft: two Boeing 727-100s and five Boeing 737-200s; since the entire population of Nauru at this time was about 8,000, the airline was in the position of having seating capacity equal to 10% of the Nauruan population. The airline had a bad reputation for cancelling flights at the whim of its government owners, including using the Boeing 727s for low-level searches for Nauruan fisherman lost at sea while relatives on board were served alcohol by the flight attendants. From this high point (at least in terms of fleet numbers) the airline gradually contracted in size, leasing some aircraft and selling others.

In 1988, the fleet consisted of three Boeing 737-200s with the one remaining 727-100 leased out to Trans Australia Airlines. At this time, the airline was badly affected by an industrial dispute with its pilots and was operating without a set timetable, a situation that lasted for several months. The majority of the airline's pilots struck in May 1988 after the secretary of the Nauru Airline Pilots' Association, Captain Thomas Reid, was dismissed by the government. The strike also affected the island of Kiribati, which provided the fastest and cheapest air link to Australia.

To replace the striking pilots, the airline tried to recruit pilots from Australia and New Zealand, however the pilots' associations in these two countries refused. An agreement with the Indian government was reached to send 20 Indian Airlines pilots to fly for Air Nauru on a rotation basis.

In the early 1990s, an Air Nauru 737 was chartered to operate the Auckland-Niue route of Niue Airlines, the latter company's only service.

In 1993, two of the 737-200s were replaced by a pair of Boeing 737-400s, leaving the Boeing 737-200C to soldier on for a little while longer while the runway in Tarawa was being rebuilt. The 737-400s were built to Qantas standards, and were maintained by the Australian flag carrier. One of 737-400s was sold to Qantas in June 1995 as part of a move to rationalize services. The airline, by now operating only a single 737-400, was corporatised in July 1996 as the Nauru Air Corporation (NAC).

Mismanagement of the island's wealth and the resulting economic troubles caused the airline to lose large amounts of money, and on some occasions become insolvent. Its operations were also suspended for brief periods in the 1990s because of concerns raised by Australia over the airworthiness and safety record of its aircraft. Airline offices and equipment were also frequently repossessed by the Australian government for Nauru's repeated defaults on foreign loans. The airline became in dispute with the Export-Import Bank of the United States in 2002, and in December 2005, the High Court of Australia upheld an earlier decision to allow the bank to seize Air Nauru's only aircraft, leaving Nauru and the island nation of Kiribati without air services. The aircraft was seized by creditors at Melbourne Airport on 18 December 2005. Following the acquisition of a replacement aircraft (a Boeing 737-300) in mid 2006, the airline was rebranded as Our Airline and relaunched on 14 October 2006. Our Airline was renamed Nauru Airlines on 1 August 2014.

Nauru Airlines is now wholly owned by the state and had 65 employees in July 2012.

== Destinations ==
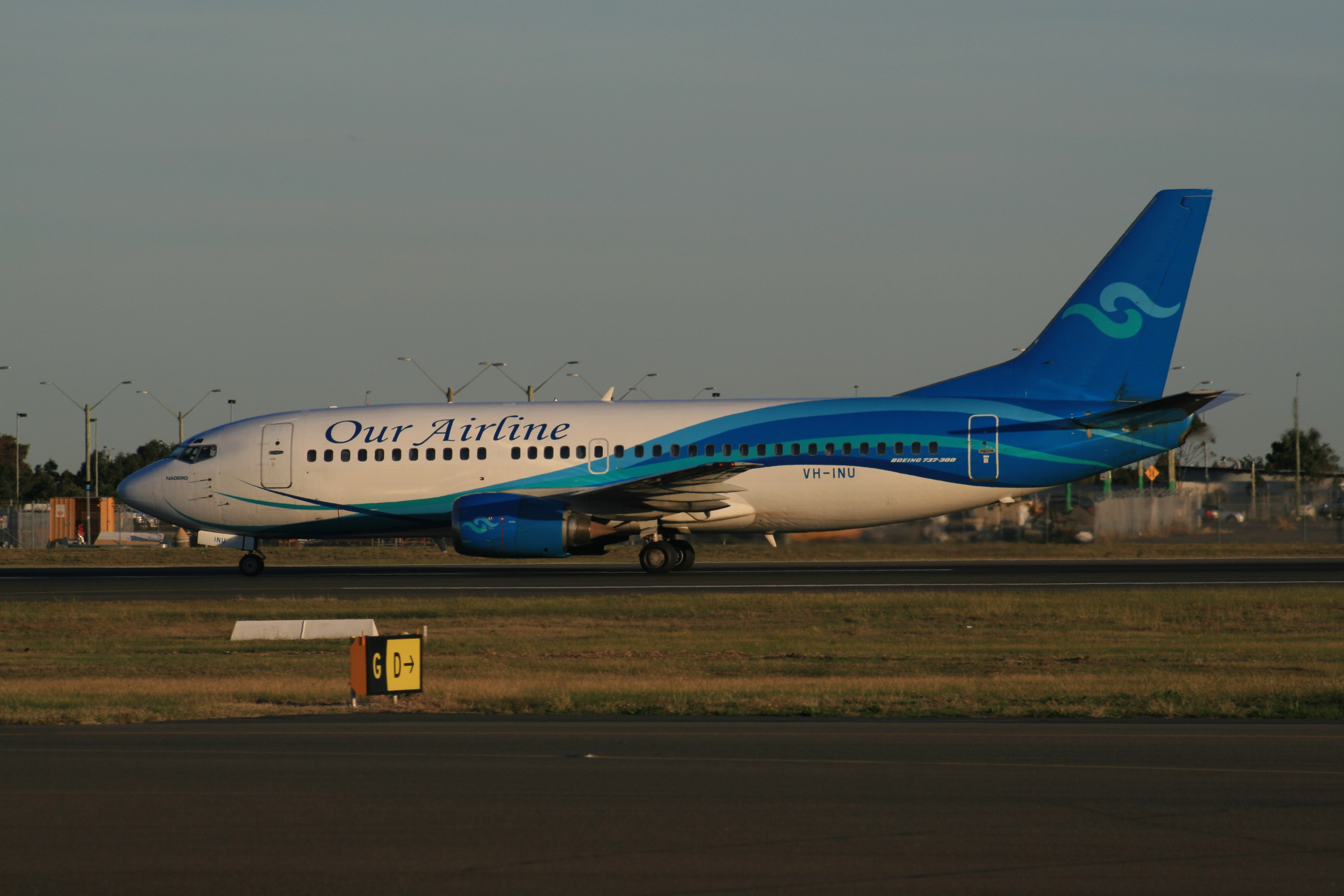
Nauru Airline Boeing 737-300 taxiing at Sydney Airport, Australia (2007)

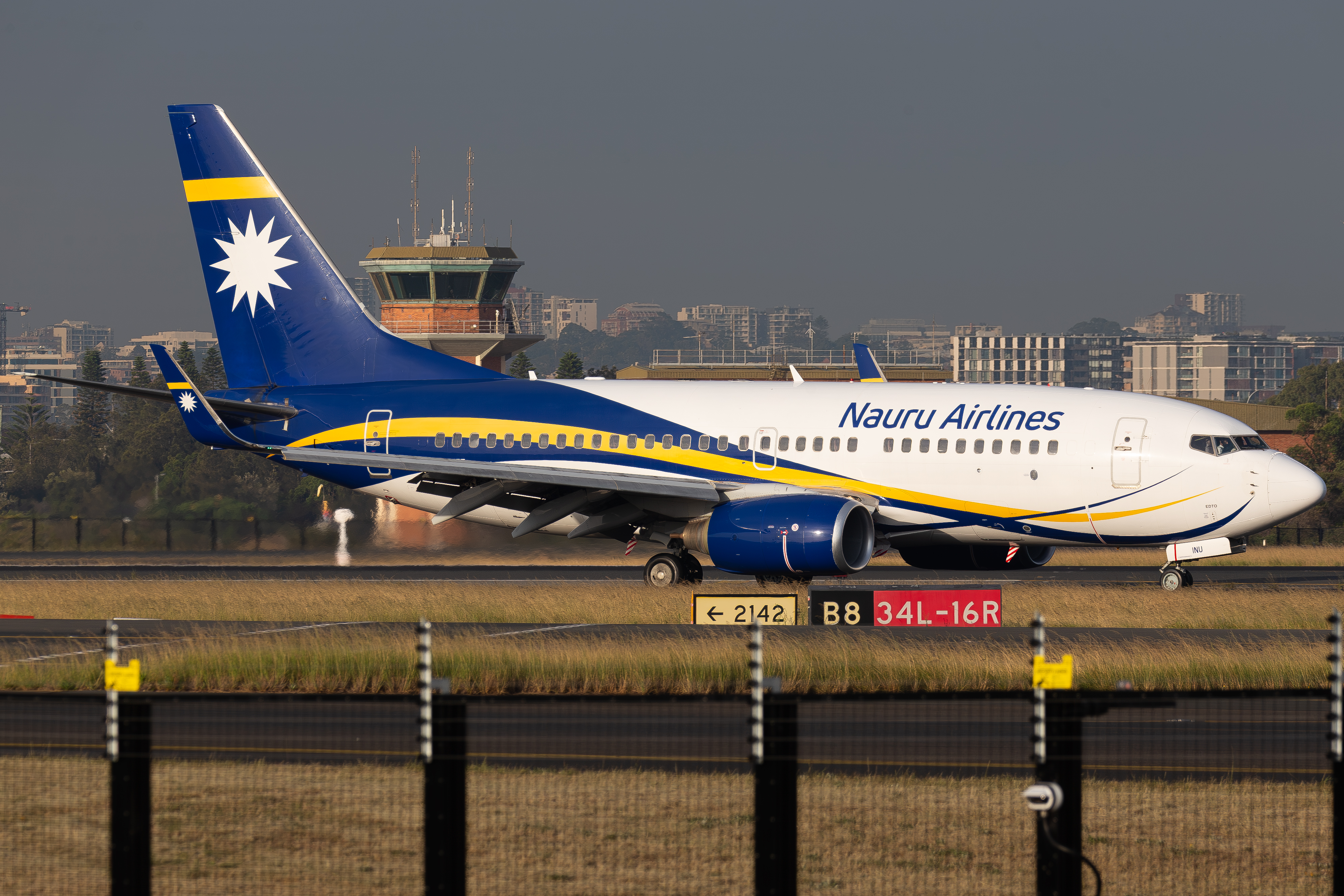
Boeing 737-700 VH-INU taxiing at Sydney Airport, 2025

Nauru Airlines serves the following destinations as of September 2025:

| Country | City | Airport |
|---|---|---|
| Australia | Brisbane | Brisbane Airport |
| Federated States of Micronesia | Pohnpei | Pohnpei International Airport |
| Fiji | Nadi | Nadi International Airport |
| Fiji | Suva | Nausori International Airport |
| Kiribati | Kiritimati | Cassidy International Airport |
| Kiribati | Tarawa | Bonriki International Airport |
| Marshall Islands | Majuro | Marshall Islands International Airport |
| Nauru | Yaren | Nauru International Airport ^{[Base]} |
| Palau | Koror | Roman Tmetuchl International Airport |
| Philippines | Clark | Clark International Airport |

=== Historical destinations ===
Air Nauru once had a notably comprehensive network in the Asia-Pacific, with services to:

- Auckland
- Melbourne
- Sydney
- Hong Kong
- Kagoshima
- Taipei
- Okinawa
- Manila
- Singapore
- Guam
- Saipan
- Koror
- Chuuk
- Pohnpei
- Kosrae
- Majuro
- Tarawa
- Honolulu
- Honiara
- Port Vila
- Nouméa
- Apia
- Pago Pago
- Nadi
- Tonga
- Kanton Island
- Niue
- Rarotonga

The average load factor throughout the network was only around 20%, with many flights carrying few or no passengers. The Nauru government subsidized the airline with profits from phosphate mining. Due to the phosphate reserves depleting in the early 1990s, along with the mismanagement of the island's mineral reserves, the airline began to cease services to unprofitable destinations.

=== Relaunch of services ===
Since relaunching services in 2006, the airline has repeatedly adjusted its route map. When the airline initially resumed services in 2006, it offered a twice-weekly service from Brisbane to Honiara, Nauru, Tarawa, and Majuro. These were quickly curtailed, with flights to Majuro eliminated. The Tarawa extension was suspended from July 2008 to November 2009 because, along with the high fuel prices of the time, operating the Tarawa flight was not profitable without a connecting destination. The Tarawa extension was suspended again in 2011 because of disputes, but it was resumed in early 2012. Meanwhile, Honiara service was suspended around the same time.

Although it had been reported in early 2007 that Our Airline would begin services between Nauru and Fiji in the very near future, the airline instead provided once weekly Tarawa to Nadi service on behalf of Air Kiribati beginning in November 2009. However, the service between Nauru and Fiji which began in 2010 ceased in December 2011 due to a dispute between the governments of Kiribati and Fiji. This was replaced with a bi-weekly direct flight between Nauru and Nadi, in Fiji.

As of December 2019, Nauru Airlines served four destinations from its base in Nauru: Brisbane, Majuro, Nadi, and Tarawa. However, three of these destinations have since been discontinued and the airline currently only has limited service to Brisbane. Thus, the Nauru Airlines service between Brisbane and Nauru is now the only scheduled service of any airline to Nauru.

In May 2023, Nauru Airlines applied to the US Department of Transportation for permission to fly scheduled cargo and passenger flights to Guam using Boeing 737 equipment. In 2017, the airline successfully obtained a five-year foreign carrier's permit allowing such flights but due to COVID-19 and other reasons, never used the permit. The filing also said the airline was in the final stages of securing a Boeing 737-800SF which will be registered as VH-8TG (msn 33003).

=== Airline partnerships ===
Nauru Airlines currently has a interline partnership with Air Kiribati.

== Services provided to Norfolk Island ==
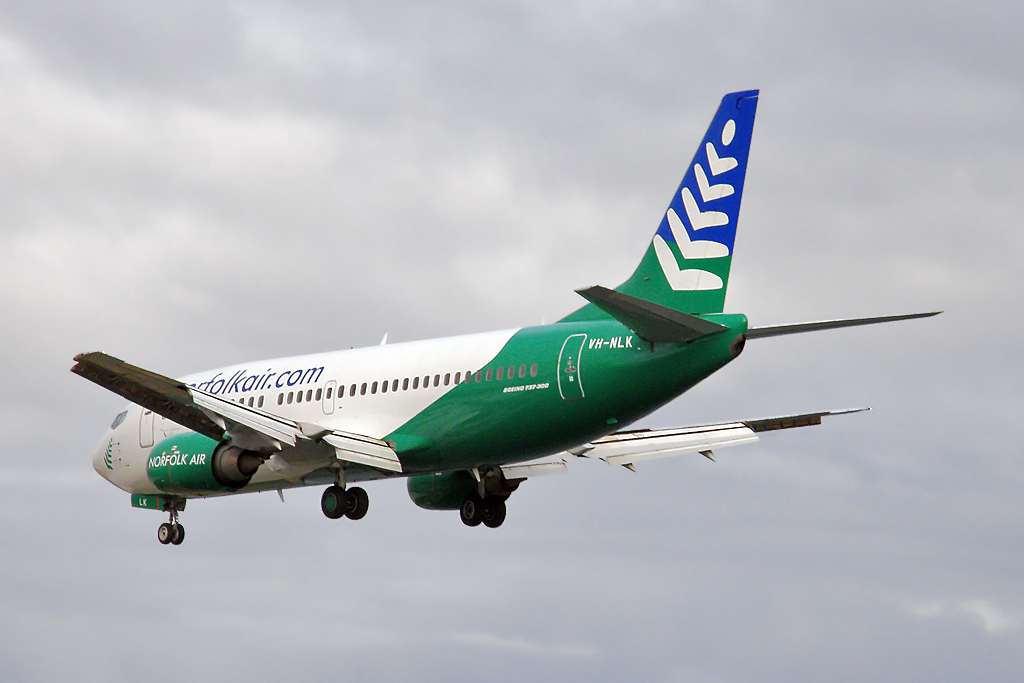
Nauru Airlines Boeing 737-300 operating for Norfolk Air (2010)

Norfolk Island's Norfolk Jet Express and Norfolk Air had chartered Nauru Airlines to fly services between Norfolk Island and Brisbane, Newcastle, Melbourne and Sydney. Norfolk Jet Express went out of business on 4 June 2005. A government operated airline, called Norfolk Air, was then established but with no aircraft of its own, Qantas operated the flights from 11 June 2005 using Air Nauru's Boeing 737-400. This arrangement ceased later that year, when the aircraft was seized due to Air Nauru's own financial problems. Other airlines filled the gap for Norfolk Air, but Air Nauru again started providing aircraft for Norfolk Air flights in April 2009. The Norfolk government closed down Norfolk Air in March 2012, with a new agreement that Air New Zealand would take over the Norfolk Island flights, using its own aircraft.

== Fleet ==
As of August 2025, Nauru Airline operates an all-Boeing 737 fleet composed of the following aircraft:

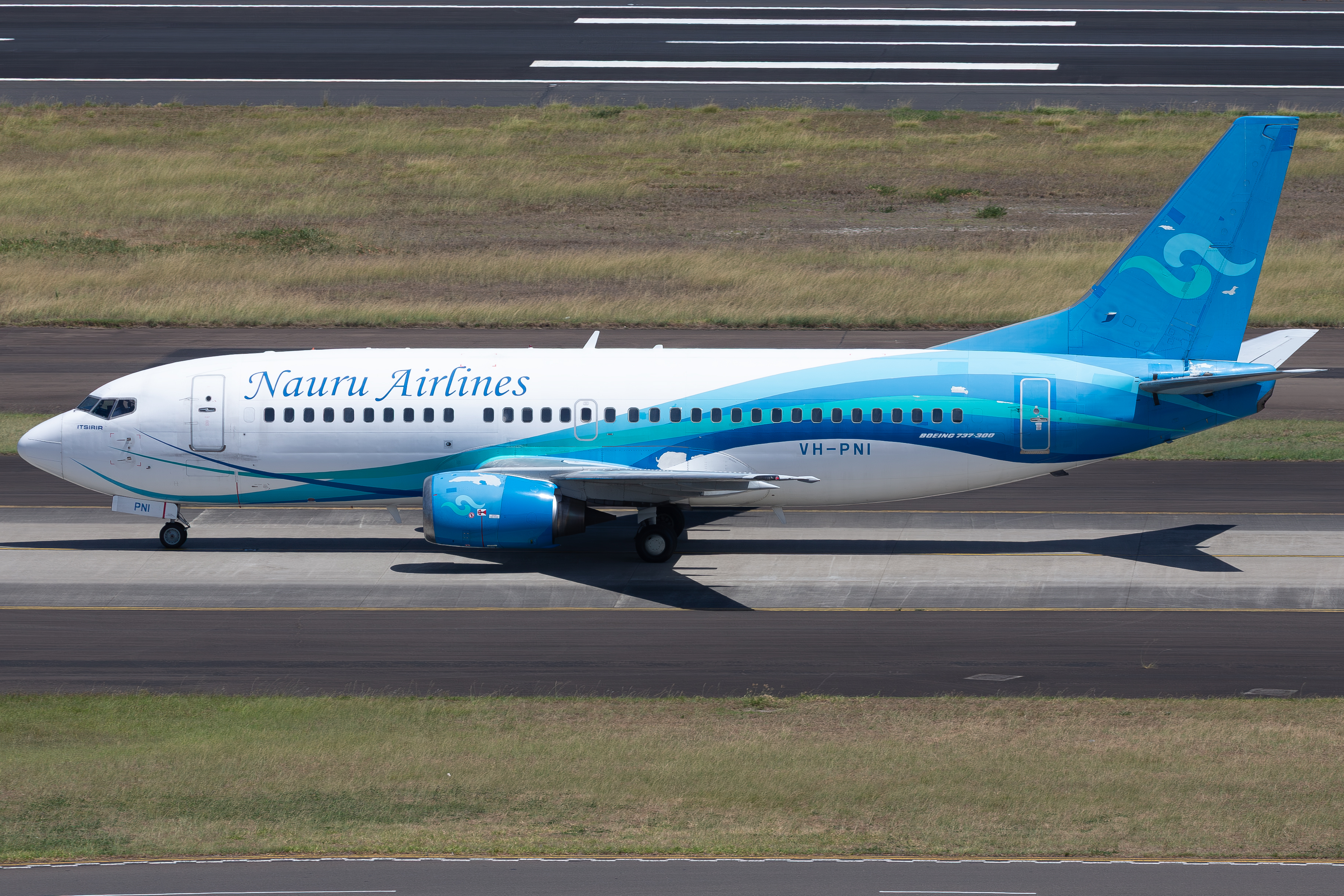
Boeing 737-300 VH-PNI, taxiing at Sydney Airport, 2025

Nauru Airlines fleet
| Aircraft | In service | Orders | Passengers | | | Notes |
| Aircraft | In service | Orders | J | Y | Total | Notes |
|---|---|---|---|---|---|---|
| Boeing 737-300 | 2 | — | 12 | 108 | 120 | |
| Boeing 737-300SF | 2 | — | Freighter | | | |
| Boeing 737-700 | 1 | — | 8 | 108 | 116 | |
| Boeing 737-800 | 1 | — | 10 | 168 | 178 | |
| Boeing 737-800SF | 1 | — | Freighter | | | |
| Total | 7 | — | | | | |

Previously operated jet aircraft:

- Boeing 727-100
- Boeing 737-200
- Boeing 737-400
- Dassault Falcon 20
- Fokker F28-1000 Fellowship

In March 2006, the government of the Republic of China, reportedly as a reward for Nauru's diplomatic recognition of the ROC instead of the People's Republic of China, assisted Air Nauru with the purchase of a second-hand Boeing 737, which was expected to be in operation by mid 2006, after several logistical delays. This purchase was put on hold in May 2006 due to OzJet and Air Pacific (now Fiji Airways) having started on the routes formerly operated by Air Nauru. In October 2006, the new Boeing plane came into service. The plane was registered as VH-INU and named as 'Naoero'. In 2008, the Airline bought their second Boeing 737-300 adorned with a full Norfolk Air livery, remaining till now despite Norfolk Air's current state of closure. The plane was registered as VH-NLK. Later in March 2013, the airline purchased a Boeing 737-300 from GECAS. The plane was painted in the 'Our Airline' livery in Melbourne, making its first visit to Brisbane Airport on 3 September 2013.
