= Tan Holdings Corporation =

Guamanian company

- Founded: 1991; 35 years ago on Saipan, Northern Mariana Islands
- Headquarters: Guam, United States
- Key people: Tan Siu Lin (chairperson)

Tan Holdings Corporation is a holding company with operations on Guam, USA, in the Commonwealth of the Northern Mariana Islands (CNMI), which is also a territory of the United States, in the Federated States of Micronesia, Palau, and more recently, in Papua New Guinea. It is known for its abuse of Chinese laborers on Saipan resulting with Levi's severing all ties with the company once the conditions of the workers came to light.

== History ==
Established in Saipan in 1991, Tan Holdings Corporation serves as the umbrella organization to businesses established as early as 1972 in Guam by the Tan family, led by its patriarch, Tan Siu Lin.

From its first company in 1972 which distributed films to local cinemas, Tan Siu Lin with the support of his wife Lam Pek Kim and their children, built their business to include real estate and shipping. Today, the family-run business has evolved to include cargo airlines, commercial fishing, ground handling service, hotels, information technology, financial services, logistics services, publishing, retail and wholesale distribution, amusement, and fast food.

Jerry Tan, third son to Tan Siu Lin and Lam Pek Kim, and who is based in Saipan, serves as the company's COO and President. He has, for the past decade or so, been heading the company's activities and thrusts across the western pacific. The company's Executive Vice-President is George Chiu, who is based in Guam.

In the 1980s–1990s, at the height of the garment industry in Saipan, the Tan family's garment operations were one of the largest on-island. However, in 2005 when the garment quota on China was lifted, factories in Saipan began to shift operations back to China, where labor was much cheaper. Saipan saw the last of its factories close down in 2008.

In 1992, Cited for sub-minimum wages, seven-day work weeks with 12-hour shifts, poor living conditions and other indignities, Tan Holdings Corporation, Levi Strauss' Marianas subcontractor, paid what were then the largest fines in U.S. labor history, distributing more than $9 million in restitution to some 1,200 employees. Tan Holdings launched the airline company Asia Pacific Airlines in 1998.

In 2002, Tan Holdings Corporation established the Tan Holdings Foundation, an organization whose sole existence was to promote and support the philanthropic efforts and aspirations of Dr. Tan Siu Lin and his family.

With the loss of garment manufacturing as a key industry, Tan Holdings shifted its focus to tourism, heavily investing in the industry and promoting the islands to China, Korea and Russia, as well as to the CNMI's traditional market, Japan.

After failing to launch Saipan Airlines in 2012, Tan Holdings sued Arizona-based Swift Air for refusing to reimburse its security deposit on the failed contract.

Tan Holdings is the owner of Tango Inc. which operates movie theaters and opened its second location in 2006. In 2019, Tan Holdings sold 80% of Guam's Century Insurance to South Korea-based DB Insurance. In 2021, the group signed an agreement with Intercontinental Hotels Group to turn The Fiesta Resort Guam into a Crowne Plaza Resort.

== See also ==
- Jack Abramoff CNMI scandal
- Latte FC
