= Palau Airways =

Flight company

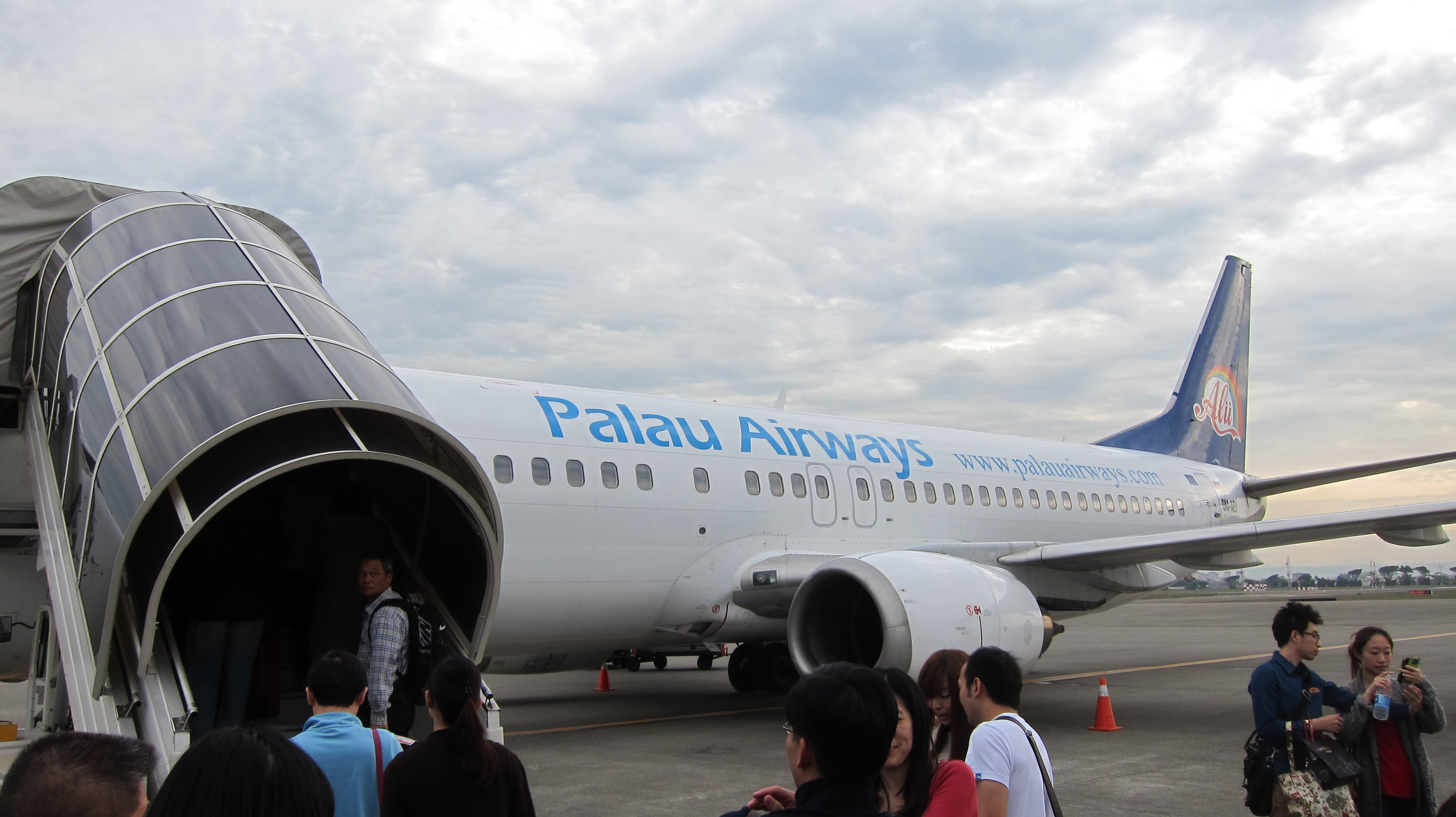
IATA	ICAO	Call sign
P7	PAU	PALAIRWAYS
- Founded: 2011
- Ceased operations: 2013
- Hubs: Roman Tmetuchl International Airport
- Frequent-flyer program: N/A
- Alliance: N/A
- Fleet size: 1
- Destinations: 2
- Parent company: N/A
- Headquarters: Roman Tmetuchl International Airport
- Key people: Teo Yong-Hwee, CEO
- Website: http://www.palauairways.com

Palau Airways Corp. was an airline based in Palau. Their head office was Room #209 in the RMTRI Building in Koror. With the Taiwan branch having been located in Shilin District, Taipei.

== Destinations ==
- Palau
  - Koror – Roman Tmetuchl International Airport
- Taiwan
  - Taipei – Taiwan Taoyuan International Airport
- Hong Kong
  - Hong Kong – Hong Kong International Airport

Besides these destinations, the airline also had plans to expand to Japan, South Korea, Philippines and Australia.

== History ==
=== Beginning ===
The airline was founded in 2011 but did not begin their operations until 6 May 2012.

=== Cease of operations ===
After a drop in passengers, Palau Airways shut down on 11 November 2018.
