= Edmund Kalau =

German Christian missionary (1928–2014)

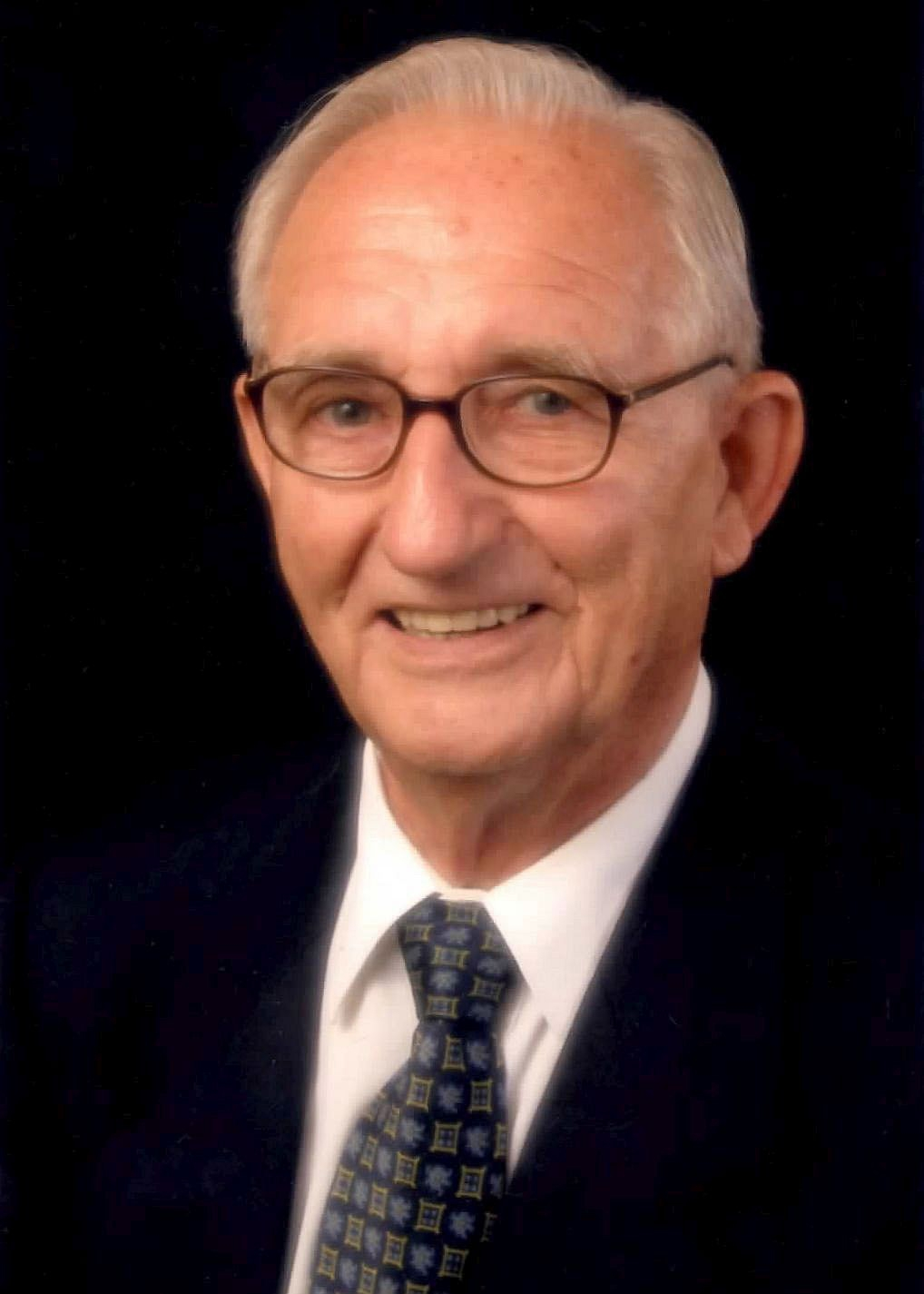
- Edmund Kalau in 2008
- Born: 9 July 1928; East Prussia
- Died: 8 January 2014 (aged 85); Tamuning, Guam
- Education: Philadelphia University, Peterborough Flying School, Nyack Missionary College
- Occupations: Aviator; missionary; pastor
- Years active: 1954–2004
- Spouse: Elisabeth Grünewald

Edmund J. Kalau (9 July 1928 – 8 January 2014) was a German aviator, missionary, and pastor. Initially an atheist and member of the Hitler Youth, he converted to Christianity after encountering a Russian doctor following World War II. As an adult, Kalau served as a missionary in Micronesia with his wife, Elizabeth. They founded the Pacific Missionary Aviation (PMA) to facilitate air travel throughout Micronesia.

== Biography ==
=== Early life and World War II ===
Kalau was born on 9 July 1928 in East Prussia. At the age of 10 he joined the Hitler Youth, and went on to attend Hitler Youth Leadership High School and the Hitler Youth Flying Corps. After World War II, he encountered a Russian doctor who converted him from atheism to Christianity.

During his life, Kalau studied anthropology at the Philadelphia University, and earned a U.S. pilot's license and mechanics license at Peterborough Flying School.

=== Missionary work ===
In 1950 Kalau entered the Theological Seminary of Liebenzell Mission to begin a four-year training to become a missionary. He married Elisabeth Grünewald on 15 October 1954. He was ordained in 1954 and trained in Schooley's Mountain, New Jersey and at the Nyack Missionary College.

Kalau and his wife arrived in Palau in January 1956. Kalau established a Lutheran Servicemen's Center in Anigua, Guam in the late 1950s, which eventually developed into the Lutheran Church of Guam. After three years on Palau, they joined Johannes Aigesiil and his wife to serve on Yap. As part of an effort to fight alcoholism on Yap, Kalau helped construct a youth center.

=== Pacific Missionary Aviation ===
Logo of Pacific Missionary Aviation

A part of the Kalaus' missionary work in Micronesia involved ferrying sick people to district hospitals on the mainland. They established the Pacific Missionary Aviation (PMA) in 1974 to provide faster transport to the people of Micronesia. This strained the Kalaus' relation with the Liebenzell Mission and they eventually severed ties.

The PMA started with a twin-engine plane. It was incorporated in Guam on 24 April 1974 and began aviation services the next year. It expanded to the Philippines in 1982 under the name Flying Medical Samaritans (FMS) to avoid confusion with the Philippine Military Academy. By 1992, the PMA had eight aircraft and two medical vessels. Edmund acted as president until 1999 when he gave the position to his son Norbert.

The PMA is nonprofit and nondenominational service agency. It is considered part of the Restoration Movement. The PMA provides services such as emergency medical evacuations, search and rescue operations, medicine and food drops, church support, and passenger and cargo support.

Kalau and his wife retired in August 2004. He served as a pastor for the PMA's mission church in Guam, the Pacific Mission Fellowship. He died on 8 January 2014 in Tamuning, Guam.
