= Roman Tmetuchl International Airport =

Airport in Palau

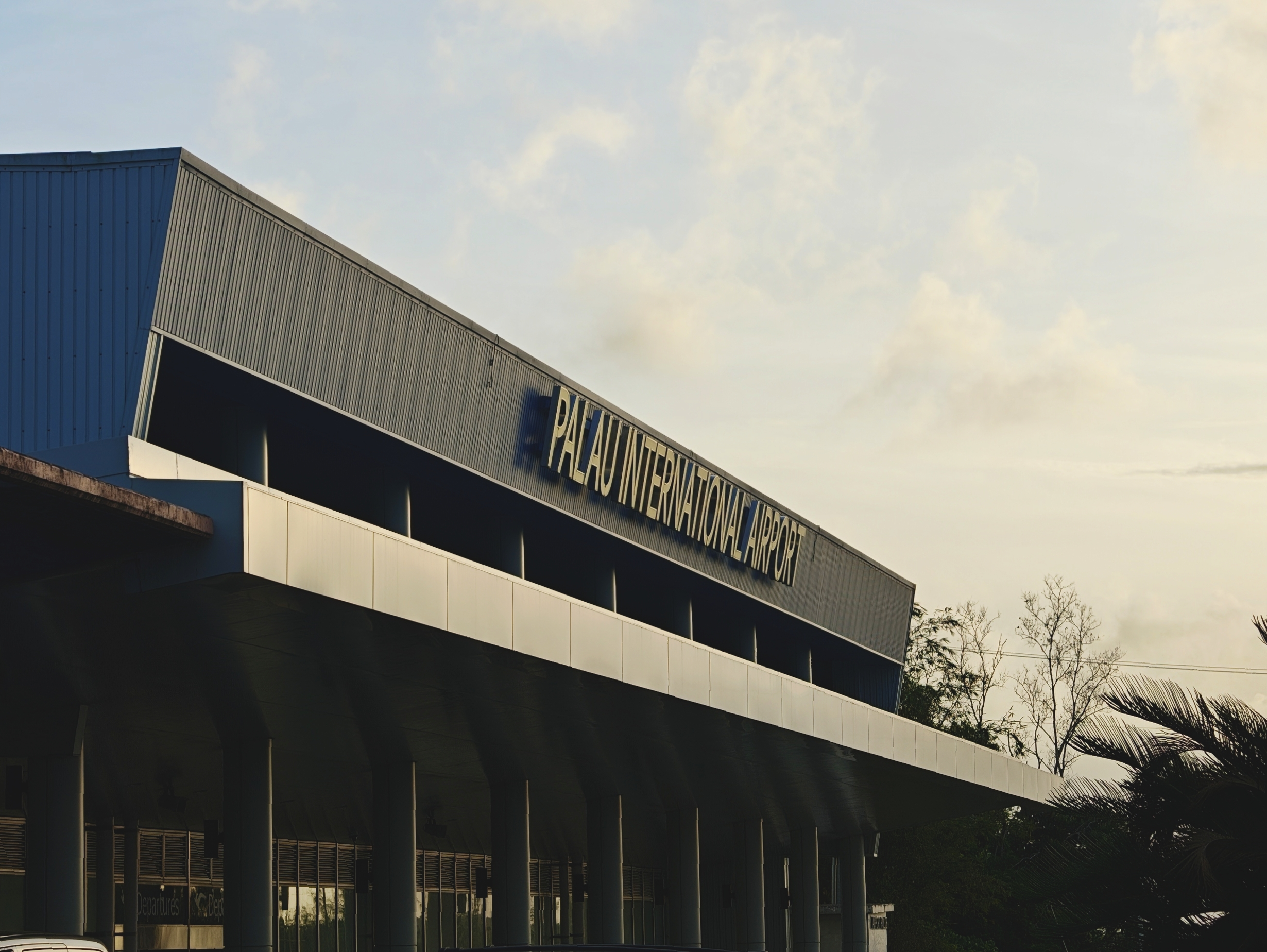

- IATA: ROR; ICAO: PTRO; FAA LID: ROR

Summary
- Airport type: Public
- Owner: Republic of Palau
- Location: Yelch, Airai, Babeldaob Island, Palau
- Elevation AMSL: 176 ft (54 m)
- Coordinates: 07°22′02″N 134°32′39″E
- Website: www.palau-airport.com

Maps
- FAA airport diagram
- Interactive map of Roman Tmetuchl International Airport

Runways
Direction	Length		Surface
Direction	ft	m	Surface
09/27	7,200	2,195	Asphalt/concrete
- Sources: FAA, DAFIF

Roman Tmetuchl International Airport (IATA: ROR, ICAO: PTRO, FAA LID: ROR), also known as Palau International Airport, is the main airport of Palau. It is located in Yelch, Airai State on Babeldaob island, near the former capital Koror. The airport is 4 miles (6 km) from Koror and 15 miles (25 km) from Ngerulmud.

== Overview ==
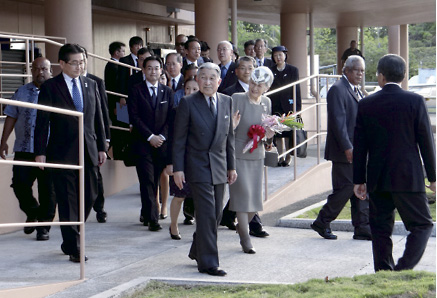
Emperor Akihito and Empress Michiko of Japan at the airport on 8 April 2015

The airport covers an area of 480 acres (190 ha) at an elevation of 176 feet (54 m) above mean sea level. It has one runway designated 9/27 with an asphalt and concrete surface measuring 7,200 by 150 feet (2,194 x 45 m). For the 12-month period ending December 13, 2004, the airport had 1,142 aircraft operations, an average of 95 per month: 78% scheduled commercial, 10% air taxi, 8% general aviation and 4% military.

== History ==
According to the Official Airline Guide (OAG), the only airline serving the airport in the fall of 1993 was Continental Micronesia (formerly Air Micronesia), a division of Continental Airlines, operating nonstop Boeing 727-200 jet service from Guam, Manila, Taipei and Yap, Caroline Islands.

A resolution adopted by the Senate of Palau in May 2006 renamed Palau International Airport as the Roman Tmetuchl International Airport, in honor of the late local politician and businessman Roman Tmetuchl. It is also known as Babelthuap/Koror Airport or Airai Airport.

Delta Air Lines provided scheduled service to Tokyo-Narita until 2018. Following Delta's withdrawal from the Palau market, Skymark Airlines announced that it would start charter service from Narita to Palau, and upgrade these flights to scheduled service in mid-2019. Skymark subsequently also stopped flying to Palau, but Air Niugini flies the route and, after April of 2025, so does United Airlines.

== Airlines and destinations ==
Airlines	Destinations
Belau Air	Angaur, Peleliu
Caroline Islands Air	Yap
China Airlines	Taipei–Taoyuan
Greater Bay Airlines	Charter: Hong Kong
Hong Kong Airlines	Charter: Hong Kong
Pacific Missionary Aviation	Angaur, Peleliu, Yap
Philippine Airlines	Manila
Qantas	Brisbane
United Airlines	Guam, Manila, Tokyo–Narita
