= List of airports by IATA code: K =

The DST column shows the months in which Daylight Saving Time, a.k.a. Summer Time, begins and ends. A blank DST box usually indicates that the location stays on Standard Time all year, although in some cases the location stays on Summer Time all year. If a location is currently on DST, add one hour to the time in the Time column.

IATA	ICAO	Airport name	Location served	Time	DST
-KA-
KAA	FLKS	Kasama Airport	Kasama, Zambia	UTC+02:00	
KAB	FVKB	Kariba Airport	Kariba, Zimbabwe	UTC+02:00	
KAC	OSKL	Kamishly Airport	Qamishli (Kamishly), Syria	UTC+02:00	Mar–Oct
KAD	DNKA	Kaduna Airport	Kaduna, Nigeria	UTC+01:00	
KAE		Kake Seaplane Base	Kake, Alaska, United States	UTC−09:00	Mar–Nov
KAF		Karato Airport	Karato, Papua New Guinea	UTC+11:00	
KAG	RKNN	Gangneung Air Base	Gangneung, South Korea	UTC+09:00	
KAI	SYKA	Kaieteur International Airport	Kaieteur, Guyana	UTC−04:00	
KAJ	EFKI	Kajaani Airport	Kajaani, Finland	UTC+02:00	Mar–Oct
KAK		Kar Airport	Kar, Papua New Guinea	UTC+10:00	
KAL	PAKV	Kaltag Airport	Kaltag, Alaska, United States	UTC−09:00	Mar–Nov
KAM	ODKM	Kamaran Airport	Kamaran, Yemen	UTC+03:00	
KAN	DNKN	Mallam Aminu Kano International Airport	Kano, Nigeria	UTC+01:00	
KAO	EFKS	Kuusamo Airport	Kuusamo, Finland	UTC+02:00	Mar–Oct
KAP	FZSK	Kapanga Airport	Kapanga, Democratic Republic of the Congo	UTC+02:00	
KAQ	AYKH	Kamulai Airport	Kamulai, Papua New Guinea	UTC+10:00	
KAR	SYKM	Kamarang Airport	Kamarang, Guyana	UTC−04:00	
KAS	FYKB	Karasburg Airport	Karasburg, Namibia	UTC+01:00	Sep–Apr
KAT	NZKT	Kaitaia Airport	Kaitaia, New Zealand	UTC+12:00	Sep–Apr
KAU	EFKA	Kauhava Airfield	Kauhava, Finland	UTC+02:00	Mar–Oct
KAV	SVKA	Kavanayén Airport	Kavanayén, Venezuela	UTC−04:00	
KAW	VYKT	Kawthaung Airport	Kawthaung, Myanmar	UTC+06:30	
KAX	YKBR	Kalbarri Airport	Kalbarri, Western Australia, Australia	UTC+08:00	
KAY	NFNW	Wakaya Airport	Wakaya Island, Fiji	UTC+12:00	Nov–Jan
KAZ	WAMK	Kuabang Airport	Kao, Indonesia	UTC+09:00	
-KB-
KBA	GFKB	Kabala Airport	Kabala, Sierra Leone	UTC±00:00	
KBB		Kirkimbie Airport	Kirkimbie Station, Northern Territory, Australia	UTC+09:30	
KBC		Birch Creek Airport (FAA: Z91)	Birch Creek, Alaska, United States	UTC−09:00	Mar–Nov
KBD		Kimberley Downs Airport	Kimberley Downs, Western Australia, Australia	UTC+08:00	
KBE		Bell Island Hot Springs Seaplane Base	Bell Island, Alaska, United States	UTC−09:00	Mar–Nov
KBF	WABK	Karubaga Airport	Karubaga, Indonesia	UTC+09:00	
KBG	HUKF	Kabalega Falls Airport	Kabalega Falls, Uganda	UTC+03:00	
KBI	FKKB	Kribi Airport	Kribi, Cameroon	UTC+01:00	
KBJ	YKCA	Kings Canyon Airport	Kings Canyon, Northern Territory, Australia	UTC+09:30	
KBK	VEKI	Kushinagar International Airport	Kushinagar, India	UTC+05:30	
KBL	OAKB	Kabul International Airport	Kabul, Afghanistan	UTC+04:30	
KBM	AYKB	Kabwum Airport	Kabwum, Papua New Guinea	UTC+10:00	
KBN	FZWT	Tunta Airport	Kabinda, Democratic Republic of the Congo	UTC+01:00	
KBO	FZRM	Kabalo Airport	Kabalo, Democratic Republic of the Congo	UTC+02:00	
KBP	UKBB	Boryspil International Airport	Kyiv, Ukraine	UTC+02:00	Mar–Oct
KBQ	FWKG	Kasungu Airport	Kasungu, Malawi	UTC+02:00	
KBR	WMKC	Sultan Ismail Petra Airport	Kota Bharu, Kelantan, Malaysia	UTC+08:00	
KBS	GFBO	Bo Airport	Bo, Sierra Leone	UTC±00:00	
KBT		Kaben Airport	Kaben, Maloelap Atoll, Marshall Islands	UTC+12:00	
KBU	WRBK	Gusti Syamsir Alam Airport (Stagen Airport)	Kotabaru, Indonesia	UTC+07:00	
KBV	VTSG	Krabi Airport	Krabi, Thailand	UTC+07:00	
KBW		Chignik Bay Seaplane Base (FAA: Z78)	Chignik, Alaska, United States	UTC−09:00	Mar–Nov
KBX	WASU	Kambuaya Airport	Ayamaru, Indonesia	UTC+09:00	
KBY	YKBY	Streaky Bay Airport	Streaky Bay, South Australia, Australia	UTC+09:30	Oct–Apr
KBZ	NZKI	Kaikoura Aerodrome	Kaikōura, New Zealand	UTC+12:00	Sep–Apr
-KC-
KCA	ZWKC	Kuqa Qiuci Airport	Kuqa, Xinjiang, China	UTC+06:00	
KCB	SMTP	Tepoe Airstrip	Kasikasima, Suriname	UTC−03:00	
KCC		Coffman Cove Seaplane Base	Coffman Cove, Alaska, United States	UTC−09:00	Mar–Nov
KCD		Kamur Airport	Kamur, Indonesia	UTC+09:00	
KCE	YCSV	Collinsville Airport	Collinsville, Queensland, Australia	UTC+10:00	
KCF		Kadanwari Airport	Kadanwari, Pakistan	UTC+05:00	
~~KCG~~		~~Chignik Fisheries Airport~~ (closed)	Chignik, Alaska, United States		
KCH	WBGG	Kuching International Airport	Kuching, Sarawak, Malaysia	UTC+08:00	
KCJ		Komaio Airport	Komaio, Papua New Guinea	UTC+10:00	
KCK	UIKK	Kirensk Airport	Kirensk, Irkutsk Oblast, Russia	UTC+08:00	
KCL		Chignik Lagoon Airport (Chignik Flats Airport)	Chignik Lagoon, Alaska, United States	UTC−09:00	Mar–Nov
KCM	LTCN	Kahramanmaraş Airport	Kahramanmaraş, Turkey	UTC+03:00	
KCN		Chernofski Harbor Seaplane Base	Chernofski Harbor, Alaska, United States	UTC−09:00	Mar–Nov
KCO	LTBQ	Cengiz Topel Naval Air Station	İzmit, Turkey	UTC+03:00	
KCP		Kamianets-Podilskyi Airport	Kamianets-Podilskyi, Ukraine	UTC+02:00	Mar–Oct
KCQ		Chignik Lake Airport (FAA: A79)	Chignik Lake, Alaska, United States	UTC−09:00	Mar–Nov
KCR		Colorado Creek Airport	Colorado Creek, Alaska, United States	UTC−09:00	Mar–Nov
KCS	YKCS	Kings Creek Station Airport	Kings Creek Station, Northern Territory, Australia	UTC+09:30	
KCT	VCCK	Koggala Airport	Koggala, Sri Lanka	UTC+05:30	
KCU	HUMI	Masindi Airport	Masindi, Uganda	UTC+03:00	
KCZ	RJOK	Kōchi Ryōma Airport	Kōchi, Shikoku, Japan	UTC+09:00	
-KD-
KDA	GOGK	Kolda North Airport	Kolda, Senegal	UTC±00:00	
KDB	YKBL	Kambalda Airport	Kambalda, Western Australia, Australia	UTC+08:00	
KDC	DBBK	Kandi Airport	Kandi, Benin	UTC+01:00	
KDD	OPKH	Khuzdar Airport	Khuzdar, Pakistan	UTC+05:00	
KDE	AYOW	Koroba Airport	Koroba, Papua New Guinea	UTC+10:00	
KDH	OAKN	Kandahar International Airport	Kandahar, Afghanistan	UTC+04:30	
KDI	WAWW	Haluoleo Airport	Kendari, Indonesia	UTC+08:00	
KDJ	FOGJ	Ndjolé Ville Airport	Ndjolé, Gabon	UTC+01:00	
KDK	PAKD	Kodiak Municipal Airport	Kodiak, Alaska, United States	UTC−09:00	Mar–Nov
KDL	EEKA	Kärdla Airport	Kärdla, Estonia	UTC+02:00	Mar–Oct
KDM	VRMT	Kaadedhdhoo Airport	Kaadedhdhoo Island, Gaafu Dhaalu Atoll, Maldives	UTC+05:00	
KDN	FOGE	Ndendé Airport	Ndendé, Gabon	UTC+01:00	
KDO	VRMK	Kadhdhoo Airport	Kadhdhoo Island, Laamu Atoll, Maldives	UTC+05:00	
KDP	AYNN	Kandep Airport	Kandep, Papua New Guinea	UTC+10:00	
KDQ	AYTO	Kamberatoro Airport	Kamberatoro, Papua New Guinea	UTC+10:00	
KDR	AYKC	Kandrian Airport	Kandrian, Papua New Guinea	UTC+10:00	
KDS		Kamaran Downs Airport	Kamaran Downs, Queensland, Australia	UTC+10:00	
KDT	VTBK	Kamphaeng Saen Airport	Kamphaeng Saen, Thailand	UTC+07:00	
KDU	OPSD	Skardu Airport	Skardu, Pakistan	UTC+05:00	
KDV	NFKD	Vunisea Airport	Vunisea, Kadavu Island, Fiji	UTC+12:00	Nov–Jan
KDW		Victoria Reservoir Seaplane Base	Kandy, Sri Lanka	UTC+05:30	
KDX	HSLI	Kadugli Airport	Kaduqli (Kadugli), Sudan	UTC+03:00	
KDY	UEMH	Teply Klyuch Airport	Khandyga, Yakutia, Russia	UTC+09:00	
KDZ		Polgolla Reservoir Seaplane Base	Kandy, Sri Lanka	UTC+05:30	
-KE-
KEA	UTAE	Kerki Airport	Kerki, Turkmenistan	UTC+05:00	
KEB		Nanwalek Airport	Nanwalek, Alaska, United States	UTC−09:00	Mar–Nov
KEC	FZQG	Kasenga Airport	Kasenga, Democratic Republic of the Congo	UTC+02:00	
KED	GQNK	Kaédi Airport	Kaédi, Mauritania	UTC±00:00	
KEE	FCOK	Kelle Airport	Kellé, Republic of the Congo	UTC+01:00	
KEF	BIKF	Keflavík International Airport	Reykjavík, Iceland	UTC±00:00	
KEG	AYLG	Keglsugl Airport	Keglsugl, Papua New Guinea	UTC+10:00	
KEH		Kenmore Air Harbor (FAA: S60)	Kenmore, Washington, United States	UTC−08:00	Mar–Nov
KEI	WAKP	Kepi Airport	Kepi, Indonesia	UTC+09:00	
KEJ	UNEE	Kemerovo International Airport	Kemerovo, Kemerovo Oblast, Russia	UTC+07:00	
KEK		Ekwok Airport	Ekwok, Alaska, United States	UTC−09:00	Mar–Nov
KEL	EDHK	Kiel Airport	Kiel, Schleswig-Holstein, Germany	UTC+01:00	Mar–Oct
KEM	EFKE	Kemi-Tornio Airport	Kemi / Tornio, Finland	UTC+02:00	Mar–Oct
KEN	GFKE	Kenema Airport	Kenema, Sierra Leone	UTC±00:00	
KEO	DIOD	Odienné Airport	Odienné, Ivory Coast	UTC±00:00	
KEP	VNNG	Nepalgunj Airport	Nepalgunj, Nepal	UTC+05:45	
KEQ	WASE	Kebar Airport	Kebar, Indonesia	UTC+09:00	
KER	OIKK	Kerman Airport	Kerman, Iran	UTC+03:30	Mar–Sep
KES	CZEE	Kelsey Airport	Kelsey, Manitoba, Canada	UTC−06:00	Mar–Nov
KET	VYKG	Kengtung Airport	Kengtung, Myanmar	UTC+06:30	
KEU	HKKE	Keekorok Airport	Keekorok, Kenya	UTC+03:00	
KEV	EFHA	Halli Airport	Kuorevesi, Finland	UTC+02:00	Mar–Oct
KEW		Keewaywin Airport (TC LID: CPV8)	Keewaywin, Ontario, Canada	UTC−06:00	Mar–Nov
KEX	AYNB	Kanabea Airport	Kanabea, Papua New Guinea	UTC+10:00	
KEY	HKKR	Kericho Airport	Kericho, Kenya	UTC+03:00	
KEZ		Kelani River-Peliyagoda Waterdrome	Colombo, Sri Lanka	UTC+05:30	
-KF-
KFA	GQNF	Kiffa Airport	Kiffa, Mauritania	UTC±00:00	
KFE	YFDF	Fortescue Dave Forrest Airport	Cloudbreak, Western Australia, Australia	UTC+08:00	
KFG	YKKG	Kalkgurung Airport	Kalkarindji, Northern Territory, Australia	UTC+09:30	
KFM		Kirby Lake Airport	Wood Buffalo, Alberta, Canada	UTC−06:00	Mar–Nov
KFP	PAKF	False Pass Airport	False Pass, Alaska, United States	UTC−09:00	Mar–Nov
KFS	LTAL	Kastamonu Airport	Kastamonu, Turkey	UTC+03:00	
KFZ	LAKU	Kukës International Airport	Kukës, Albania	UTC+01:00	Mar–Oct
-KG-
KGA	FZUA	Kananga Airport	Kananga, Democratic Republic of the Congo	UTC+02:00	
KGB	AYOE	Konge Airport	Konge, Papua New Guinea	UTC+10:00	
KGC	YKSC	Kingscote Airport	Cygnet River, South Australia, Australia	UTC+09:30	Oct–Apr
KGD	UMKK	Khrabrovo Airport	Kaliningrad, Kaliningrad Oblast, Russia	UTC+02:00	
KGE	AGKG	Kaghau Airport	Kaghau Island, Solomon Islands	UTC+11:00	
KGF	UAKK	Sary-Arka Airport	Karaganda, Kazakhstan	UTC+06:00	
KGG	GOTK	Kédougou Airport	Kédougou, Senegal	UTC±00:00	
KGH	AYJO	Yongai Airport	Yongai, Papua New Guinea	UTC+10:00	
KGI	YPKG	Kalgoorlie-Boulder Airport	Kalgoorlie, Western Australia, Australia	UTC+08:00	
KGJ	FWKA	Karonga Airport	Karonga, Malawi	UTC+02:00	
KGK	PAJZ	Koliganek Airport (FAA: JZZ)	Koliganek, Alaska, United States	UTC−09:00	Mar–Nov
KGL	HRYR	Kigali International Airport (Kanombe Airport)	Kigali, Rwanda	UTC+02:00	
KGM		Kungim Airport	Kungim, Papua New Guinea	UTC+10:00	
KGN	FZOK	Kasongo Lunda Airport	Kasongo Lunda, Democratic Republic of the Congo	UTC+01:00	
KGO	UKKG	Kirovohrad Airport	Kropyvnytskyi, Ukraine	UTC+02:00	Mar–Oct
KGP	USRK	Kogalym International Airport	Kogalym, Khanty-Mansi Autonomous Okrug, Russia	UTC+05:00	
KGR		Kulgera Airport	Kulgera, Northern Territory, Australia	UTC+09:30	
KGS	LGKO	Kos Island International Airport	Kos, Greece	UTC+02:00	Mar–Oct
KGT	ZUKD	Kangding Airport	Kangding, Sichuan, China	UTC+08:00	
KGU	WBKG	Keningau Airport	Keningau, Sabah, Malaysia	UTC+08:00	
KGW	AYKQ	Kagi Airport	Kagi, Papua New Guinea	UTC+10:00	
KGX	PAGX	Grayling Airport	Grayling, Alaska, United States	UTC−09:00	Mar–Nov
KGY	YKRY	Kingaroy Airport	Kingaroy, Queensland, Australia	UTC+10:00	
KGZ		Glacier Creek Airport	Glacier Creek, Alaska, United States	UTC−09:00	Mar–Nov
-KH-
KHA	OITH	Khaneh Airport (Piranshahr Airport)	Piranshahr (Khaneh), Iran	UTC+03:30	Mar–Sep
KHC	UKFK	Kerch Airport (Voykovo Airport)	Kerch, Ukraine	UTC+03:00	
KHD	OICK	Khorramabad Airport	Khorramabad, Iran	UTC+03:30	Mar–Sep
KHE	UKOH	Kherson International Airport	Kherson, Ukraine	UTC+02:00	Mar–Oct
KHG	ZWSH	Kashgar Airport (Kashi Airport)	Kashgar, Xinjiang, China	UTC+06:00	
KHH	RCKH	Kaohsiung International Airport	Kaohsiung, Taiwan	UTC+08:00	
KHI	OPKC	Jinnah International Airport	Karachi, Pakistan	UTC+05:00	
KHJ	EFKJ	Kauhajoki Airfield	Kauhajoki, Finland	UTC+02:00	Mar–Oct
KHK	OIBQ	Kharg Airport	Kharg Island, Iran	UTC+03:30	Mar–Sep
KHL		The Yangtze River Delta International Airport Modern Logistics Center	Kunshan, Suzhou, Jiangsu, China	UTC+08:00	
KHM	VYKI	Khamti Airport	Khamti, Myanmar	UTC+06:30	
KHN	ZSCN	Nanchang Changbei International Airport	Nanchang, Jiangxi, China	UTC+08:00	
KHO		Khoka Moya Airport	Manyeleti, South Africa	UTC+02:00	
KHR	ZMHH	Kharkhorin Airport	Kharkhorin, Mongolia	UTC+08:00	Mar–Sep
KHS	OOKB	Khasab Airport	Khasab, Oman	UTC+04:00	
KHT	OAKS	Khost Airfield	Khost, Afghanistan	UTC+04:30	
KHU		Kremenchuk Airport	Kremenchuk, Ukraine	UTC+02:00	Mar–Oct
KHV	UHHH	Khabarovsk Novy Airport	Khabarovsk, Khabarovsk Krai, Russia	UTC+10:00	
KHW	FBKR	Khwai River Airport	Khwai River Lodge, Botswana	UTC+02:00	
KHX		Kihihi Airstrip	Kihihi, Uganda	UTC+03:00	
KHY	OITK	Khoy Airport	Khoy, Iran	UTC+03:30	Mar–Sep
KHZ	NTKA	Kauehi Aerodrome	Kauehi, Tuamotus, French Polynesia	UTC−10:00	
-KI-
KIA		Kaiapit Airport	Kaiapit, Papua New Guinea	UTC+10:00	
KIB		Ivanof Bay Seaplane Base	Ivanof Bay, Alaska, United States	UTC−09:00	Mar–Nov
KIC	KKIC	Mesa Del Rey Airport	King City, California, United States	UTC−08:00	Mar–Nov
KID	ESMK	Kristianstad Airport	Kristianstad, Sweden	UTC+01:00	Mar–Oct
KIE	AYIQ	Aropa Airport	Kieta, Papua New Guinea	UTC+11:00	
KIF		Kingfisher Lake Airport	Kingfisher Lake, Ontario, Canada	UTC−06:00	Mar–Nov
KIG		Koingnaas Airport	Koingnaas, South Africa	UTC+02:00	
KIH	OIBK	Kish International Airport	Kish Island, Iran	UTC+03:30	Mar–Sep
KII	AYLI	Kibuli Airport	Kibuli, Papua New Guinea	UTC+10:00	
KIJ	RJSN	Niigata Airport	Niigata, Honshu, Japan	UTC+09:00	
KIK	ORKK	Kirkuk Airport	Kirkuk, Iraq	UTC+03:00	
KIL		Kilwa Airport	Kilwa, Democratic Republic of the Congo	UTC+02:00	
KIM	FAKM	Kimberley Airport	Kimberley, South Africa	UTC+02:00	
KIN	MKJP	Norman Manley International Airport	Kingston, Jamaica	UTC−05:00	
KIO		Kili Airport (FAA: Q51)	Kili Island, Marshall Islands	UTC+12:00	
KIP	KCWC	Kickapoo Downtown Airport (FAA: CWC)	Wichita Falls, Texas, United States	UTC−06:00	Mar–Nov
KIQ	AYRA	Kira Airport	Kira, Papua New Guinea	UTC+10:00	
KIR	EIKY	Kerry Airport (Farranfore Airport)	Kerry, Ireland	UTC±00:00	Mar–Oct
KIS	HKKI	Kisumu International Airport	Kisumu, Kenya	UTC+03:00	
KIT	LGKC	Kithira Island National Airport	Kythira, Greece	UTC+02:00	Mar–Oct
KIU		Kiunga Airport	Kiunga, Kenya	UTC+03:00	
KIW	FLSO	Southdowns Airport	Kitwe, Zambia	UTC+02:00	
KIX	RJBB	Kansai International Airport	Osaka, Honshu, Japan	UTC+09:00	
KIY	HTKI	Kilwa Masoko Airport	Kilwa Masoko, Tanzania	UTC+03:00	
KIZ		Kikinonda Airport	Kikinonda, Papua New Guinea	UTC+10:00	
-KJ-
KJA	UNKL	Yemelyanovo International Airport	Krasnoyarsk, Krasnoyarsk Krai, Russia	UTC+07:00	
KJB	VOKU	Kurnool Airport	Orvakal, Andhra Pradesh, India	UTC+05:30	
KJH		Kaili Huangping Airport	Kaili, Guizhou, China	UTC+08:00	
KJI	ZWKN	Kanas Airport	Burqin, Xinjiang, China	UTC+06:00	
KJK	EBKT	Kortrijk–Wevelgem International Airport	Kortrijk, Belgium	UTC+01:00	Mar–Oct
KJP	ROKR	Kerama Airport	Fukaji Island, Kerama Islands, Japan	UTC+09:00	
KJT	WICA	Kertajati International Airport	Majalengka, West Java, Indonesia	UTC+07:00	
KJU		Kamiraba Airport	Kamiraba, Papua New Guinea	UTC+10:00	
KJX		Blangpidie Airport	Blangpidie, Southwest Aceh Regency, Indonesia	UTC+07:00	
-KK-
KKA	PAKK	Koyuk Alfred Adams Airport	Koyuk, Alaska, United States	UTC−09:00	Mar–Nov
KKB		Kitoi Bay Seaplane Base	Kitoi Bay, Alaska, United States	UTC−09:00	Mar–Nov
KKC	VTUK	Khon Kaen Airport	Khon Kaen, Thailand	UTC+07:00	
KKD	AYKO	Kokoda Airport	Kokoda, Papua New Guinea	UTC+10:00	
KKE	NZKK	Kerikeri Airport (Bay of Islands Airport)	Kerikeri, New Zealand	UTC+12:00	Sep–Apr
KKG		Konawaruk Airport	Konawaruk, Guyana	UTC−04:00	
KKH	PADY	Kongiganak Airport (FAA: DUY)	Kongiganak, Alaska, United States	UTC−09:00	Mar–Nov
KKI		Akiachak Airport (FAA: Z13)	Akiachak, Alaska, United States	UTC−09:00	Mar–Nov
KKJ	RJFR	Kitakyushu Airport	Kitakyushu, Kyushu, Japan	UTC+09:00	
KKK		Kalakaket Creek Air Station (FAA: 1KC)	Kalakaket Creek, Alaska, United States (Google Earth view)	UTC−09:00	Mar–Nov
KKL		Karluk Lake Seaplane Base	Karluk Lake, Alaska, United States	UTC−09:00	Mar–Nov
KKM	VTBL	Khok Kathiam Air Force Base	Lopburi, Thailand	UTC+07:00	
KKN	ENKR	Kirkenes Airport, Høybuktmoen	Kirkenes, Norway	UTC+01:00	Mar–Oct
KKO	NZKO	Kaikohe Aerodrome	Kaikohe, New Zealand	UTC+12:00	Sep–Apr
KKP	YKLB	Koolburra Airport	Koolburra, Queensland, Australia	UTC+10:00	
KKQ	USDP	Krasnoselkup Airport	Krasnoselkup, Yamalo-Nenets Autonomous Okrug, Russia	UTC+05:00	
KKR	NTGK	Kaukura Airport	Kaukura Atoll, Tuamotus, French Polynesia	UTC−10:00	
KKS	OIFK	Kashan Airport	Kashan, Isfahan, Iran	UTC+03:30	
KKT		Kentland Municipal Airport (FAA: 50I)	Kentland, Indiana, United States	UTC−06:00	Mar–Nov
KKU		Ekuk Airport	Ekuk, Alaska, United States	UTC−09:00	Mar–Nov
KKW	FZCA	Kikwit Airport	Kikwit, Democratic Republic of the Congo	UTC+01:00	
KKX	RJKI	Kikai Airport (Kikaiga Shima Airport)	Kikai, Satsunan Islands, Japan	UTC+09:00	
KKY	EIKK	Kilkenny Airport	Kilkenny, Ireland	UTC±00:00	Mar–Oct
KKZ	VDKK	Koh Kong Airport	Koh Kong, Cambodia	UTC+07:00	
-KL-
KLB	FLKL	Kalabo Airport	Kalabo, Zambia	UTC+02:00	
KLC	GOOK	Kaolack Airport	Kaolack, Senegal	UTC±00:00	
KLD	UUEM	Migalovo Air Base	Tver, Tver Oblast, Russia	UTC+03:00	
KLE	FKKH	Kaélé Airport	Kaélé, Cameroon	UTC+01:00	
KLF	UUBC	Grabtsevo Airport	Kaluga, Kaluga Oblast, Russia	UTC+03:00	
KLG	PALG	Kalskag Airport	Kalskag, Alaska, United States	UTC−09:00	Mar–Nov
KLH	VAKP	Kolhapur Airport	Kolhapur, Maharashtra, India	UTC+05:30	
KLI	FZFP	Kotakoli Air Base	Kotakoli, Democratic Republic of the Congo	UTC+01:00	
KLK	HKFG	Kalokol Airport (Fergusons Gulf Airport)	Kalokol, Kenya	UTC+03:00	
KLL		Levelock Airport (FAA: 9Z8)	Levelock, Alaska, United States	UTC−09:00	Mar–Nov
KLM	OINE	Kalaleh Airport	Kalaleh, Iran	UTC+03:30	Mar–Sep
KLN	PALB	Larsen Bay Airport (FAA: 2A3)	Larsen Bay, Alaska, United States	UTC−09:00	Mar–Nov
KLO	RPVK	Kalibo International Airport	Kalibo, Philippines	UTC+08:00	
KLQ	WIPV	Keluang Airport	Keluang, Indonesia	UTC+07:00	
KLR	ESMQ	Kalmar Airport	Kalmar, Sweden	UTC+01:00	Mar–Oct
KLS	KKLS	Southwest Washington Regional Airport	Kelso, Washington, United States	UTC−08:00	Mar–Nov
KLU	LOWK	Klagenfurt Airport	Klagenfurt, Austria	UTC+01:00	Mar–Oct
KLV	LKKV	Karlovy Vary Airport	Karlovy Vary, Czech Republic	UTC+01:00	Mar–Oct
KLW	PAKW	Klawock Airport (FAA: AKW)	Klawock, Alaska, United States	UTC−09:00	Mar–Nov
KLX	LGKL	Kalamata International Airport	Kalamata, Greece	UTC+02:00	Mar–Oct
KLY	FZOD	Kamisuku Airport	Kalima, Democratic Republic of the Congo	UTC+02:00	
KLZ	FAKZ	Kleinzee Airport	Kleinzee, South Africa	UTC+02:00	
-KM-
KMA	AYKM	Kerema Airport	Kerema, Papua New Guinea	UTC+10:00	
KMB		Koinambe Airport	Koinambe, Papua New Guinea	UTC+10:00	
KMC	OEKK	King Khaled Military City Airport	King Khalid Military City, Saudi Arabia	UTC+03:00	
KME	HRZA	Kamembe Airport	Cyangugu, Rwanda	UTC+02:00	
KMF	AYKD	Kamina Airport	Kamina, Papua New Guinea	UTC+10:00	
KMG	ZPPP	Kunming Changshui International Airport	Kunming, Yunnan, China	UTC+08:00	
KMH	FAKU	Johan Pienaar Airport	Kuruman, South Africa	UTC+02:00	
KMI	RJFM	Miyazaki Airport	Miyazaki, Kyushu, Japan	UTC+09:00	
KMJ	RJFT	Kumamoto Airport	Mashiki, Kyushu, Japan	UTC+09:00	
KMK	FCPA	Makabana Airport	Makabana, Republic of the Congo	UTC+01:00	
KML	YKML	Kamileroi Airport	Kamileroi, Queensland, Australia	UTC+10:00	
KMM		Kimaam Airport	Kimaam, Indonesia	UTC+09:00	
KMN	FZSB	Kamina Airport (Kamina Ville Airport)	Kamina, Democratic Republic of the Congo	UTC+02:00	
KMO	PAMB	Manokotak Airport (FAA: MBA)	Manokotak, Alaska, United States	UTC−09:00	Mar–Nov
KMP	FYKT	Keetmanshoop Airport	Keetmanshoop, Namibia	UTC+01:00	Sep–Apr
KMQ	RJNK	Komatsu Airport (Kanazawa Airport)	Komatsu, Honshu, Japan	UTC+09:00	
KMR	AYRI	Karimui Airport	Karimui, Papua New Guinea	UTC+10:00	
KMS	DGSI	Kumasi Airport	Kumasi, Ghana	UTC±00:00	
KMT		Kampot Airport	Kampot, Cambodia	UTC+07:00	
KMU	HCMK	Kismayo Airport (Kisimayu Airport)	Kismayo, Somalia	UTC+03:00	
KMV	VYKL	Kalaymyo Airport (Kalemyo Airport)	Kalaymyo, Myanmar	UTC+06:30	
KMW	UUBA	Kostroma Airport	Kostroma, Kostroma Oblast, Russia	UTC+03:00	
KMX	OEKM	King Khalid Air Base	Khamis Mushait, Saudi Arabia	UTC+03:00	
KMY		Moser Bay Seaplane Base	Moser Bay, Alaska, United States	UTC−09:00	Mar–Nov
KMZ	FLKO	Kaoma Airport	Kaoma, Zambia	UTC+02:00	
-KN-
KNA	SCVM	Viña del Mar Airport	Viña del Mar, Chile	UTC−04:00	Aug–May
KNB	KKNB	Kanab Municipal Airport	Kanab, Utah, United States	UTC−07:00	Mar–Nov
KND	FZOA	Kindu Airport	Kindu, Democratic Republic of the Congo	UTC+02:00	
KNE	AYKJ	Kanainj Airport	Kanainj, Papua New Guinea	UTC+10:00	
KNF	EGYM	RAF Marham	King's Lynn, England, United Kingdom	UTC±00:00	Mar–Oct
KNG	WASK	Kaimana Airport	Kaimana, Indonesia	UTC+09:00	
KNH	RCBS	Kinmen Airport (Shang Yi Airport)	Kinmen, Taiwan	UTC+08:00	
KNI	YKNG	Katanning Airport	Katanning, Western Australia, Australia	UTC+08:00	
KNJ	FCBK	Kindamba Airport	Kindamba, Republic of the Congo	UTC+01:00	
KNK	PFKK	Kokhanok Airport (FAA: 9K2)	Kokhanok, Alaska, United States	UTC−09:00	Mar–Nov
KNL		Kelanoa Airport	Kelanoa, Papua New Guinea	UTC+10:00	
KNM	FZTK	Kaniama Airport	Kaniama, Democratic Republic of the Congo	UTC+02:00	
KNN	GUXN	Kankan Airport (Diankana Airport)	Kankan, Guinea	UTC±00:00	
KNO	WIMM	Kualanamu International Airport	Medan, Indonesia	UTC+07:00	
KNP	FNCP	Kapanda Airport	Capanda, Angola	UTC+01:00	
KNQ	NWWD	Koné Airport	Koné, New Caledonia	UTC+11:00	
KNR	OIBJ	Jam Airport	Kangan, Iran	UTC+03:30	Mar–Sep
KNS	YKII	King Island Airport	King Island, Tasmania, Australia	UTC+10:00	Oct–Apr
KNT	KTKX	Kennett Memorial Airport (FAA: TKX)	Kennett, Missouri, United States	UTC−06:00	Mar–Nov
KNU	VIKA	Kanpur Airport (Chakeri Air Force Station)	Kanpur, Uttar Pradesh, India	UTC+05:30	
KNW	PANW	New Stuyahok Airport	New Stuyahok, Alaska, United States	UTC−09:00	Mar–Nov
KNX	YPKU	East Kimberley Regional Airport	Kununurra, Western Australia, Australia	UTC+08:00	
KNZ	GAKA	Kéniéba Airport	Kéniéba, Mali	UTC±00:00	
-KO-
KOA	PHKO	Kona International Airport at Keāhole	Kailua / Kona, Hawaii, United States	UTC−10:00	
KOC	NWWK	Koumac Airport	Koumac, New Caledonia	UTC+11:00	
KOD		Kotabangun Airport	Kotabangun, Indonesia	UTC+08:00	
KOE	WATT	El Tari Airport	Kupang, Indonesia	UTC+08:00	
KOF	FAKP	Komatipoort Airport	Komatipoort, South Africa	UTC+02:00	
KOG	VLKG	Khong Island Airport	Khong, Laos	UTC+07:00	
KOH	YKLA	Koolatah Airport	Koolatah, Queensland, Australia	UTC+10:00	
KOI	EGPA	Kirkwall Airport	Kirkwall, Scotland, United Kingdom	UTC±00:00	Mar–Oct
KOJ	RJFK	Kagoshima Airport	Kagoshima, Kyushu, Japan	UTC+09:00	
KOK	EFKK	Kokkola-Pietarsaari Airport	Kokkola / Jakobstad, Finland	UTC+02:00	Mar–Oct
KOL		Koumala Airport	Koumala, Central African Republic	UTC+01:00	
KOM		Komo-Manda Airport	Komo-Manda, Papua New Guinea	UTC+10:00	
KON		Kontum Airport	Kon Tum, Vietnam	UTC+07:00	
KOO	FZRQ	Kongolo Airport	Kongolo, Democratic Republic of the Congo	UTC+02:00	
KOP	VTUW	Nakhon Phanom Airport	Nakhon Phanom, Thailand	UTC+07:00	
KOQ	EDCK	Köthen Airport	Köthen, Saxony-Anhalt, Germany	UTC+01:00	Mar–Oct
KOR	AYRO	Kakoro Airport	Kakoro, Papua New Guinea	UTC+10:00	
KOS	VDSV	Sihanoukville International Airport (Kaong Kang Airport)	Sihanoukville, Cambodia	UTC+07:00	
KOT	PFKO	Kotlik Airport (FAA: 2A9)	Kotlik, Alaska, United States	UTC−09:00	Mar–Nov
KOU	FOGK	Koulamoutou Airport	Koulamoutou, Gabon	UTC+01:00	
KOV	UACK	Kokshetau Airport	Kokshetau, Kazakhstan	UTC+06:00	
KOW	ZSGZ	Ganzhou Huangjin Airport	Ganzhou, Jiangxi, China	UTC+08:00	
KOX	WABN	Kokonao Airport	Kokonao, Indonesia	UTC+09:00	
KOY		Olga Bay Seaplane Base	Olga Bay, Alaska, United States	UTC−09:00	Mar–Nov
KOZ		Ouzinkie Airport (FAA: 4K5)	Ouzinkie, Alaska, United States	UTC−09:00	Mar–Nov
-KP-
KPA	AYKG	Kopiago Airport	Kopiago, Papua New Guinea	UTC+10:00	
KPB		Point Baker Seaplane Base	Point Baker, Alaska, United States	UTC−09:00	Mar–Nov
KPC	PAPC	Port Clarence Coast Guard Station	Port Clarence, Alaska, United States	UTC−09:00	Mar–Nov
KPE	AYYP	Yapsiei Airport	Yapsiei, Papua New Guinea	UTC+10:00	
KPF	AYDL	Kondubol Airport	Kondubol, Papua New Guinea	UTC+10:00	
KPG		Kurupung Airport	Kurupung, Guyana	UTC−04:00	
KPI	WBGP	Kapit Airport	Kapit, Sarawak, Malaysia	UTC+08:00	
KPL		Kapal Airport	Kapal, Papua New Guinea	UTC+10:00	
KPM	AYAQ	Kompiam Airport	Kompiam, Papua New Guinea	UTC+10:00	
KPN	PAKI	Kipnuk Airport (FAA: IIK)	Kipnuk, Alaska, United States	UTC−09:00	Mar–Nov
KPO	RKTH	Pohang Airport	Pohang, South Korea	UTC+09:00	
KPP	YKPR	Kalpowar Airport	Kalpowar, Queensland, Australia	UTC+10:00	
KPR		Port Williams Seaplane Base	Port Williams, Alaska, United States	UTC−09:00	Mar–Nov
KPS	YKMP	Kempsey Airport	Kempsey, New South Wales, Australia	UTC+10:00	Oct–Apr
KPT		Jackpot Airport (Hayden Field) (FAA: 06U)	Jackpot, Nevada, United States	UTC−07:00	Mar–Nov
KPV	PAPE	Perryville Airport (FAA: PEV)	Perryville, Alaska, United States	UTC−09:00	Mar–Nov
KPW	UHMK	Keperveyem Airport	Keperveyem, Chukotka, Russia	UTC+12:00	
KPY		Port Bailey Seaplane Base	Port Bailey, Alaska, United States	UTC−09:00	Mar–Nov
-KQ-
KQA	PAUT	Akutan Airport	Akutan, Alaska, United States	UTC−09:00	Mar–Nov
KQH	VIKG	Ajmer Kishangarh Airport	Kishangarh, Rajasthan, India	UTC+05:30	
KQL	AYOL	Kol Airport	Kol, Papua New Guinea	UTC+10:00	
KQR	YKAR	Karara Airport	Karara, Western Australia, Australia	UTC+08:00	
KQT	UTDT	Bokhtar International Airport	Bokhtar, Tajikistan	UTC+05:00	
-KR-
KRA	YKER	Kerang Airport	Kerang, Victoria, Australia	UTC+10:00	Oct–Apr
KRB	YKMB	Karumba Airport	Karumba, Queensland, Australia	UTC+10:00	
KRC	WIPH	Depati Parbo Airport	Kerinci, Indonesia	UTC+07:00	
KRD		Kurundi Airport	Kurundi Station, Northern Territory, Australia	UTC+09:30	
KRE	HBBO	Kirundo Airport	Kirundo, Burundi	UTC+02:00	
KRF	ESNK	Höga Kusten Airport (Kramfors-Sollefteå Airport)	Kramfors / Sollefteå, Sweden	UTC+01:00	Mar–Oct
KRG	SYKS	Karasabai Airport	Karasabai, Guyana	UTC−04:00	
KRI	AYKK	Kikori Airport	Kikori, Papua New Guinea	UTC+10:00	
KRJ	AYQA	Karawari Airport	Karawari, Papua New Guinea	UTC+10:00	
KRK	EPKK	John Paul II International Airport Kraków–Balice	Kraków, Poland	UTC+01:00	Mar–Oct
KRL	ZWKL	Korla Airport	Korla, Xinjiang, China	UTC+06:00	
KRM	SYKR	Karanambo Airport	Karanambo, Guyana	UTC−04:00	
KRN	ESNQ	Kiruna Airport	Kiruna, Sweden	UTC+01:00	Mar–Oct
KRO	USUU	Kurgan Airport	Kurgan, Kurgan Oblast, Russia	UTC+05:00	
KRP	EKKA	Karup Airport	Karup, Denmark	UTC+01:00	Mar–Oct
KRQ	UKCK	Kramatorsk Airport	Kramatorsk, Ukraine	UTC+03:00	
KRR	URKK	Krasnodar International Airport (Pashkovsky Airport)	Krasnodar, Krasnodar Krai, Russia	UTC+03:00	
KRS	ENCN	Kristiansand Airport, Kjevik	Kristiansand, Norway	UTC+01:00	Mar–Oct
KRT	HSSK	Khartoum International Airport	Khartoum, Sudan	UTC+03:00	
KRU	AYEA	Kerau Airport	Kerau, Papua New Guinea	UTC+10:00	
KRV		Kimwarer Airport (Kerio Valley Airport)	Kimwarer, Kenya	UTC+03:00	
KRW	UTAK	Turkmenbashi International Airport	Türkmenbaşy, Turkmenistan	UTC+05:00	
KRX	AYKR	Karkar Airport	Karkar Island, Papua New Guinea	UTC+10:00	
KRY	ZWKM	Karamay Airport	Karamay, Xinjiang, China	UTC+06:00	
KRZ	FZBT	Basango Mboliasa Airport	Kiri, Democratic Republic of the Congo	UTC+01:00	
-KS-
KSA	PTSA	Kosrae International Airport (FAA: TTK)	Kosrae, Federated States of Micronesia	UTC+11:00	
KSB	AYNM	Kasanombe Airport	Kasanombe, Papua New Guinea	UTC+10:00	
KSC	LZKZ	Košice International Airport	Košice, Slovakia	UTC+01:00	Mar–Oct
KSD	ESOK	Karlstad Airport	Karlstad, Sweden	UTC+01:00	Mar–Oct
KSE	HUKS	Kasese Airport	Kasese, Uganda	UTC+03:00	
KSF	EDVK	Kassel Airport	Kassel, Hesse, Germany	UTC+01:00	Mar–Oct
KSG		Kisengam Airport	Kisengam, Papua New Guinea	UTC+10:00	
KSH	OICC	Shahid Ashrafi Esfahani Airport (Kermanshah Airport)	Kermanshah, Iran	UTC+03:30	Mar–Sep
KSI	GUKU	Kissidougou Airport	Kissidougou, Guinea	UTC±00:00	
KSJ	LGKS	Kasos Island Public Airport	Kasos Island, Greece	UTC+02:00	Mar–Oct
KSK	ESKK	Karlskoga Airport	Karlskoga, Sweden	UTC+01:00	Mar–Oct
KSL	HSKA	Kassala Airport	Kassala, Sudan	UTC+03:00	
KSM	PASM	St. Mary's Airport	St. Mary's, Alaska, United States	UTC−09:00	Mar–Nov
KSN	UAUU	Kostanay Airport	Kostanay, Kazakhstan	UTC+06:00	
KSO	LGKA	Kastoria National Airport (Aristotelis Airport)	Kastoria, Greece	UTC+02:00	Mar–Oct
KSP	AYOP	Kosipe Airport	Kosipe, Papua New Guinea	UTC+10:00	
KSQ	UTSL	Karshi Airport	Karshi, Uzbekistan	UTC+05:00	
KSR	WAWH	H. Aroeppala Airport	Selayar Islands, Sulawesi, Indonesia	UTC+09:00	
KSS	GASK	Sikasso Airport	Sikasso, Mali	UTC±00:00	
KST	HSKI	Rabak Airport	Kosti, Sudan	UTC+03:00	
KSU	ENKB	Kristiansund Airport, Kvernberget	Kristiansund, Norway	UTC+01:00	Mar–Oct
KSV	YSPV	Springvale Airport	Springvale, Queensland, Australia	UTC+10:00	
KSW	LLKS	Kiryat Shmona Airport	Kiryat Shmona, Israel	UTC+02:00	Mar–Oct
KSX	AYYR	Yasuru Airport	Yasuru, Papua New Guinea	UTC+10:00	
KSY	LTCF	Kars Harakani Airport	Kars, Turkey	UTC+03:00	
KSZ	ULKK	Kotlas Airport	Kotlas, Arkhangelsk Oblast, Russia	UTC+03:00	
-KT-
KTA	YPKA	Karratha Airport	Karratha, Western Australia, Australia	UTC+08:00	
KTB		Thorne Bay Seaplane Base	Thorne Bay, Alaska, United States	UTC−09:00	Mar–Nov
KTC		Katiola Airport	Katiola, Ivory Coast	UTC±00:00	
KTD	RORK	Kitadaito Airport	Kitadaito, Daitō Islands, Japan	UTC+09:00	
KTE	WMKE	Kerteh Airport	Kerteh, Terengganu, Malaysia	UTC+08:00	
KTF	NZTK	Takaka Aerodrome	Takaka, New Zealand	UTC+12:00	Sep–Apr
KTG	WIOK	Rahadi Osman Airport (Ketapang Airport)	Ketapang, Indonesia	UTC+07:00	
KTH		Tikchik Lodge Seaplane Base (FAA: AK56)	Tikchik, Alaska, United States	UTC−09:00	Mar–Nov
KTI	VDTI	Techo International Airport	Kandal, Cambodia	UTC+07:00	
KTJ		Kichwa Tembo Airport	Kichwa Tembo, Kenya	UTC+03:00	
KTK		Kunua Airport	Kunua, Papua New Guinea	UTC+11:00	
KTL	HKKT	Kitale Airport	Kitale, Kenya	UTC+03:00	
KTM	VNKT	Tribhuvan International Airport	Kathmandu, Nepal	UTC+05:45	
KTN	PAKT	Ketchikan International Airport	Ketchikan, Alaska, United States	UTC−09:00	Mar–Nov
KTO	SYKT	Kato Airport	Kato, Guyana	UTC−04:00	
KTP	MKTP	Tinson Pen Aerodrome	Kingston, Jamaica	UTC−05:00	
KTQ	EFIT	Kitee Airfield	Kitee, Finland	UTC+02:00	Mar–Oct
KTR	YPTN	RAAF Base Tindal	Katherine, Northern Territory, Australia	UTC+09:30	
KTS	PFKT	Brevig Mission Airport	Brevig Mission, Alaska, United States	UTC−09:00	Mar–Nov
KTT	EFKT	Kittilä Airport	Kittilä, Finland	UTC+02:00	Mar–Oct
KTU	VIKO	Kota Airport	Kota, Rajasthan, India	UTC+05:30	
KTV	SVKM	Kamarata Airport	Kamarata, Venezuela	UTC−04:00	
KTW	EPKT	Katowice International Airport	Katowice, Poland	UTC+01:00	Mar–Oct
KTX	GAKO	Koutiala Airport	Koutiala, Mali	UTC±00:00	
KTY	VCCN	Katukurunda Airport	Kalutara, Sri Lanka	UTC+05:30	
-KU-
KUA	WMKD	Sultan Haji Ahmad Shah Airport (RMAF Kuantan)	Kuantan, Pahang, Malaysia	UTC+08:00	
KUC	NGKT	Kuria Airport	Kuria, Kiribati	UTC+12:00	
KUB	WBAK	Anduki Airfield	Seria, Belait District, Brunei	UTC+8:00	
KUD	WBKT	Kudat Airport	Kudat, Sabah, Malaysia	UTC+08:00	
KUE	AGKU	Kukundu Airport	Kolombangara, Western Province, Solomon Islands	UTC+11:00	
KUF	UWWW	Kurumoch International Airport	Samara, Samara Oblast, Russia	UTC+04:00	
KUG	YKUB	Kubin Airport	Moa Island, Queensland, Australia	UTC+10:00	
KUH	RJCK	Kushiro Airport	Kushiro, Hokkaido, Japan	UTC+09:00	
KUK	PFKA	Kasigluk Airport (FAA: Z09)	Kasigluk, Alaska, United States	UTC−09:00	Mar–Nov
KUL	WMKK	Kuala Lumpur International Airport	Kuala Lumpur,^{1} Malaysia	UTC+08:00	
KUM	RJFC	Yakushima Airport	Yakushima, Ōsumi Islands, Japan	UTC+09:00	
KUN	EYKA	Kaunas International Airport	Kaunas, Lithuania	UTC+02:00	Mar–Oct
KUO	EFKU	Kuopio Airport	Kuopio, Finland	UTC+02:00	Mar–Oct
KUP		Kupiano Airport	Kupiano, Papua New Guinea	UTC+10:00	
KUQ	AYKU	Kuri Airport	Kuri, Papua New Guinea	UTC+10:00	
KUR	OARZ	Razer Airport	Koran va Monjan (Kiran wa Munjan), Afghanistan	UTC+04:30	
KUS	BGKK	Kulusuk Airport	Kulusuk, Greenland	UTC−03:00	Mar–Oct
KUT	UGKO	David the Builder Kutaisi International Airport	Kutaisi, Georgia	UTC+04:00	
KUU	VIBR	Bhuntar Airport (Kullu Manali Airport)	Kullu, Himachal Pradesh, India	UTC+05:30	
KUV	RKJK	Gunsan Airport	Gunsan, South Korea	UTC+09:00	
KUX		Kuyol Airport	Kuyol, Papua New Guinea	UTC+11:00	
KUY		Kamusi Airport	Kamusi, Papua New Guinea	UTC+11:00	
-KV-
KVA	LGKV	Kavala International Airport (Alexander the Great Airport)	Kavala, Greece	UTC+02:00	Mar–Oct
KVB	ESGR	Skövde Airport	Skövde, Sweden	UTC+01:00	Mar–Oct
KVC	PAVC	King Cove Airport	King Cove, Alaska, United States	UTC−09:00	Mar–Nov
KVE		Kitava Island Airport	Kitava Island, Papua New Guinea	UTC+10:00	
KVG	AYKV	Kavieng Airport	Kavieng, Papua New Guinea	UTC+10:00	
KVK	ULMK	Kirovsk-Apatity Airport (Khibiny Airport)	Kirovsk / Apatity, Murmansk Oblast, Russia	UTC+03:00	
KVL	PAVL	Kivalina Airport	Kivalina, Alaska, United States	UTC−09:00	Mar–Nov
KVM	UHMO	Markovo Airport	Markovo, Chukotka, Russia	UTC+12:00	
KVO	LYKV	Morava Airport	Lađevci, Serbia		
KVR		Kavalerovo Airport	Kavalerovo, Primorsky Krai, Russia	UTC+10:00	
KVS		Kunshan City Air Terminal of Shanghai Airport	Kunshan, Suzhou, Jiangsu, China	UTC+08:00	
KVU		Korolevu Seaplane Base	Korolevu, Fiji	UTC+12:00	Nov–Jan
KVX	USKK	Pobedilovo Airport	Kirov, Kirov Oblast, Russia	UTC+03:00	
-KW-
KWA	PKWA	Bucholz Army Airfield	Kwajalein, Marshall Islands	UTC+12:00	
KWB		Dewadaru Airport	Karimun Java, Indonesia	UTC+07:00	
KWD		Kavadja Airport	Kavadja, Central African Republic	UTC+01:00	
KWE	ZUGY	Guiyang Longdongbao International Airport	Guiyang, Guizhou, China	UTC+08:00	
KWF		Waterfall Seaplane Base	Waterfall, Alaska, United States	UTC−09:00	Mar–Nov
KWG	UKDR	Kryvyi Rih International Airport	Kryvyi Rih (Krivoi Rog), Ukraine	UTC+02:00	Mar–Oct
KWH	OAHN	Khwahan Airport	Khwahan, Afghanistan	UTC+04:30	
KWI	OKKK	Kuwait International Airport	Kuwait City, Kuwait	UTC+03:00	
KWJ	RKJJ	Gwangju Airport	Gwangju (Kwangju), South Korea	UTC+09:00	
KWK	PAGG	Kwigillingok Airport (FAA: GGV)	Kwigillingok, Alaska, United States	UTC−09:00	Mar–Nov
KWL	ZGKL	Guilin Liangjiang International Airport	Guilin, Guangxi, China	UTC+08:00	
KWM	YKOW	Kowanyama Airport	Kowanyama, Queensland, Australia	UTC+10:00	
KWN	PAQH	Quinhagak Airport (FAA: AQH)	Quinhagak, Alaska, United States	UTC−09:00	Mar–Nov
KWO	AYKW	Kawito Airport	Kawito, Papua New Guinea	UTC+10:00	
KWP		West Point Village Seaplane Base	West Point, Alaska, United States	UTC−09:00	Mar–Nov
KWR		Kwai Harbour Airport	Kwai Harbour, Solomon Islands	UTC+11:00	
KWS	AGKW	Kwailabesi Airport	Kwailabesi, Solomon Islands	UTC+11:00	
KWT	PFKW	Kwethluk Airport	Kwethluk, Alaska, United States	UTC−09:00	Mar–Nov
KWV		Kurwina Airport	Kurwina, Papua New Guinea	UTC+11:00	
KWX		Kiwai Island Airport	Kiwai Island, Papua New Guinea	UTC+10:00	
KWY		Kiwayu Airport	Kiwayu, Kenya	UTC+03:00	
KWZ	FZQM	Kolwezi Airport	Kolwezi, Democratic Republic of the Congo	UTC+02:00	
-KX-
KXA		Kasaan Seaplane Base	Kasaan, Alaska, United States	UTC−09:00	Mar–Nov
KXB	WAWP	Sangia Nibandera Airport	Kolaka, Indonesia		
KXD	USHK	Kondinskoye Airport	Kondinskoye, Khanty-Mansi Autonomous Okrug, Russia	UTC+05:00	
KXE	FAKD	Klerksdorp Airport (P.C. Pelser Airport)	Klerksdorp, South Africa	UTC+02:00	
KXF	NFNO	Koro Airport	Koro Island, Fiji	UTC+12:00	Nov–Jan
KXK	UHKK	Komsomolsk-on-Amur Airport	Komsomolsk-on-Amur, Khabarovsk Krai, Russia	UTC+10:00	
KXR		Karoola Airport	Karoola, Papua New Guinea	UTC+10:00	
KXU	NTKT	Katiu Airport	Katiu, Tuamotus, French Polynesia	UTC−10:00	
-KY-
KYA	LTAN	Konya Airport	Konya, Turkey	UTC+03:00	
KYD	RCLY	Lanyu Airport	Orchid Island, Taiwan	UTC+08:00	
KYE	OLKA	Rene Mouawad Air Base (Kleyate Airport)	Tripoli, Lebanon	UTC+02:00	Mar–Oct
KYF	YYLR	Yeelirrie Airport	Yeelirrie, Western Australia, Australia	UTC+08:00	
KYI	YYTA	Yalata Airport	Yalata Mission, South Australia, Australia	UTC+09:30	Oct–Apr
KYK	PAKY	Karluk Airport	Karluk, Alaska, United States	UTC−09:00	Mar–Nov
KYO		Tampa North Aero Park (FAA: X39)	Tampa, Florida, United States	UTC−05:00	Mar–Nov
KYP	VYKP	Kyaukpyu Airport	Kyaukpyu, Myanmar	UTC+06:30	
KYS	GAKY	Kayes Airport (Dag-Dag Airport)	Kayes, Mali	UTC±00:00	
KYT	VYKU	Kyauktu Airport	Kyaukhtu, Myanmar	UTC+06:30	
KYU	PFKU	Koyukuk Airport	Koyukuk, Alaska, United States	UTC−09:00	Mar–Nov
KYX	AYYE	Yalumet Airport	Yalumet, Papua New Guinea	UTC+10:00	
KYZ	UNKY	Kyzyl Airport	Kyzyl, Tuva, Russia	UTC+07:00	
-KZ-
KZB		Zachar Bay Seaplane Base	Zachar Bay, Alaska, United States	UTC−09:00	Mar–Nov
KZC	VDKH	Kampong Chhnang Airport	Kampong Chhnang, Cambodia	UTC+07:00	
KZD		Krakor Airport	Krakor, Cambodia	UTC+07:00	
KZF	AYKT	Kaintiba Airport	Kaintiba, Papua New Guinea	UTC+10:00	
KZG	ETIN	Kitzingen Airport	Kitzingen, Bavaria, Germany	UTC+01:00	Mar–Oct
KZI	LGKZ	Kozani National Airport (Filippos Airport)	Kozani, Greece	UTC+02:00	Mar–Oct
KZN	UWKD	Kazan International Airport	Kazan, Tatarstan, Russia	UTC+03:00	
KZO	UAOO	Kyzylorda Airport	Kyzylorda, Kazakhstan	UTC+06:00	
KZR	LTBZ	Zafer Airport	Kütahya, Turkey	UTC+03:00	
KZS	LGKJ	Kastellorizo Island Public Airport	Kastellorizo, Greece	UTC+02:00	Mar–Oct

== Notes ==
- ^1 Airport is located in the Sepang, Selangor state.
