= Nulato, Alaska =

Nulato: Noolaaghe Doh (Koyukon); Нулато (Russian)
- City
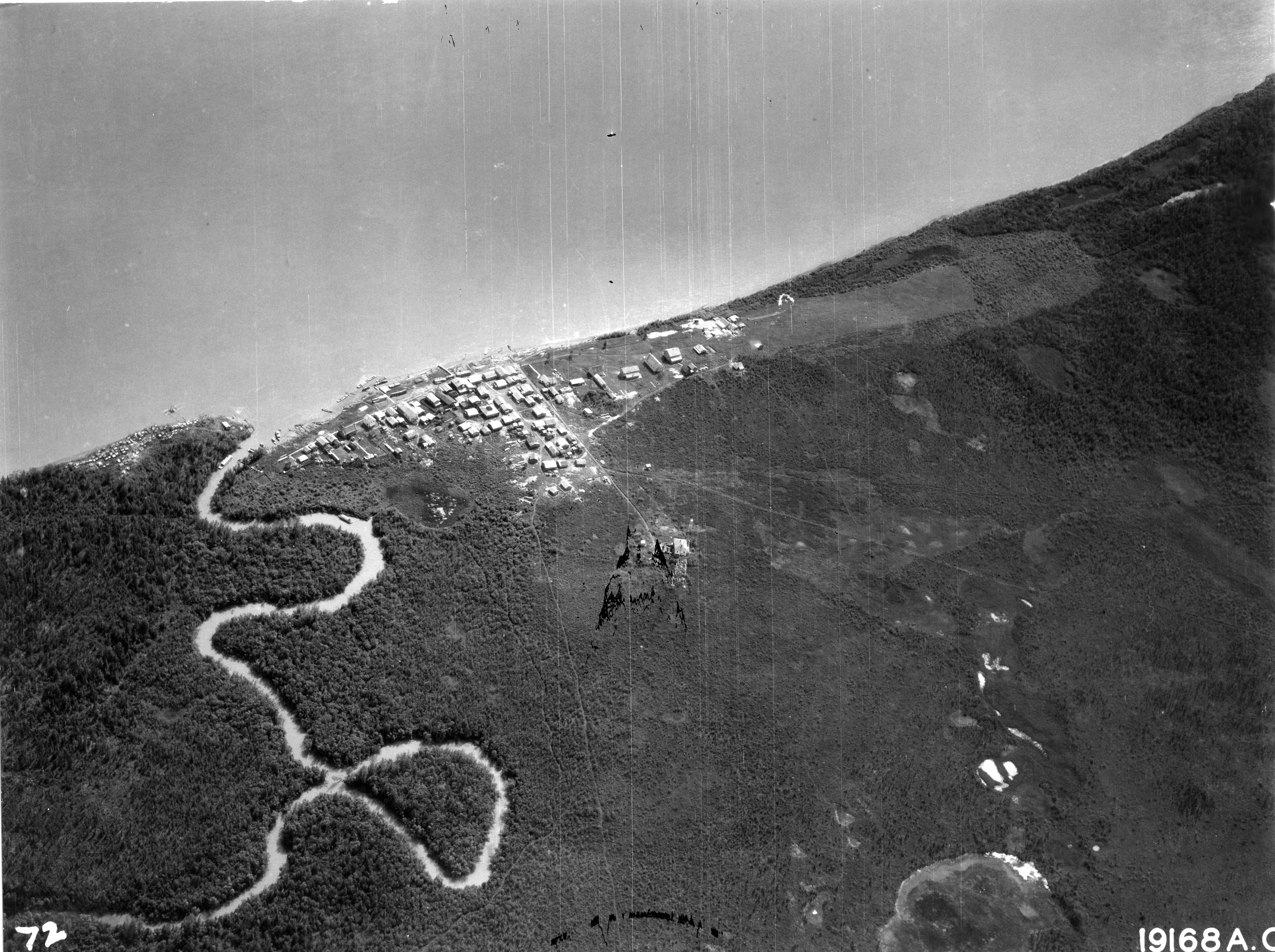
- Nulato in the 1940s

- Location in Alaska
- Coordinates: 64°43′48″N 158°6′51″W
- Country: United States
- State: Alaska
- Census Area: Yukon-Koyukuk
- Incorporated: April 22, 1963

Government
  - Mayor: Maurice McGinty
  - State senator: Click Bishop (R)
  - State rep.: Mike Cronk (R)

Area
  - Total: 43.78 sq mi (113.40 km^{2})
  - Land: 41.09 sq mi (106.43 km^{2})
  - Water: 2.69 sq mi (6.98 km^{2})
- Elevation: 115 ft (35 m)

Population (2020)
  - Total: 239
  - Density: 5.8/sq mi (2.25/km^{2})
- Time zone: UTC-9 (Alaska (AKST))
  - Summer (DST): UTC-8 (AKDT)
- ZIP code: 99765
- Area code: 907
- FIPS code: 02-56350
- GNIS feature ID: 1407321

Nulato (/nuːˈlætoʊ/; Koyukon: Noolaaghe Doh, lit. 'chum salmon fish camp' [nuːlaːɣə tɔːχ]; Russian: Нулато) is a city in Yukon-Koyukuk Census Area, Alaska, United States. At the 2020 census, the population was 239.

== History ==
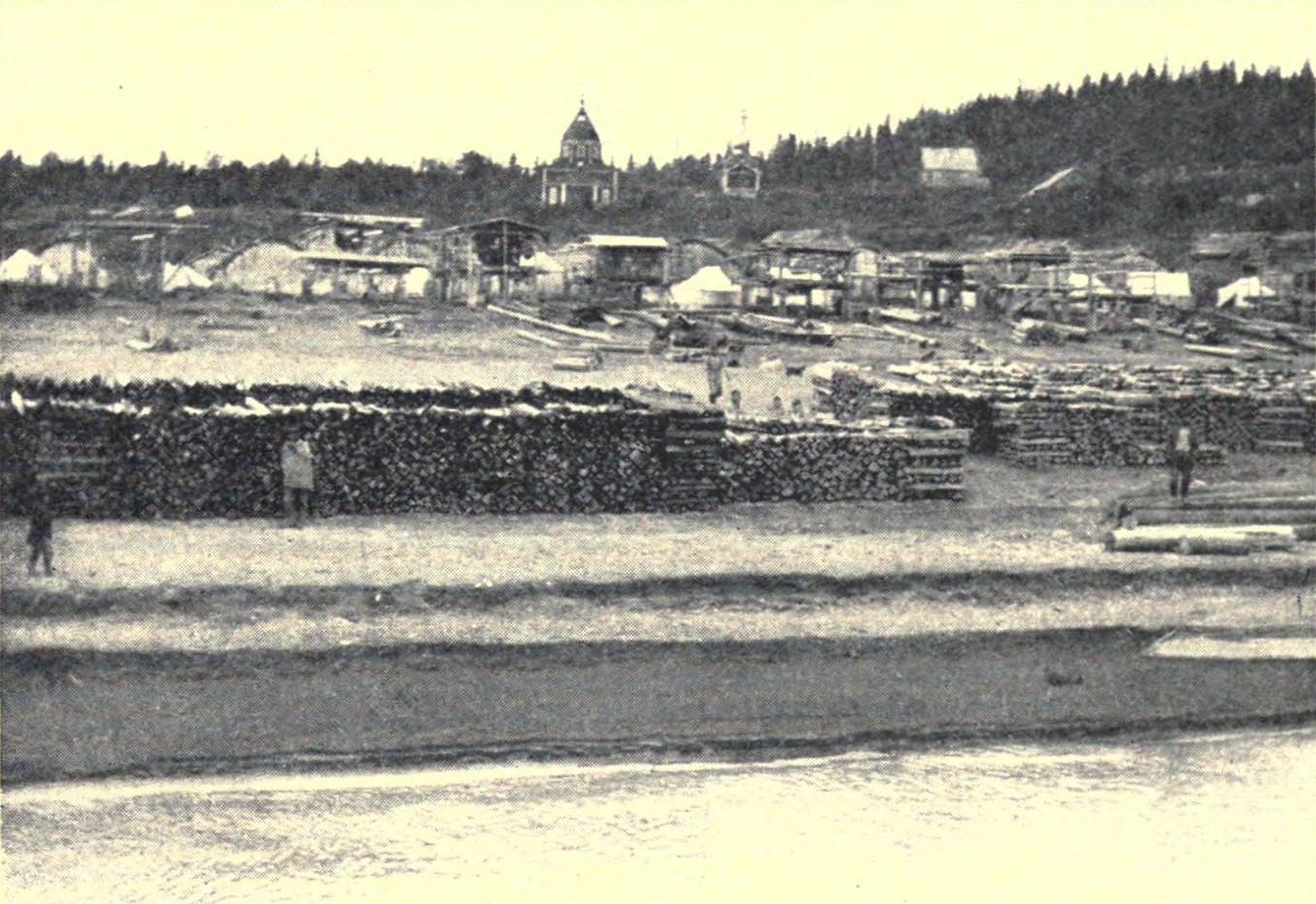
Woodyard and Nulato, Alaska circa 1908

Nulato was a location for trade between the Koyukon people and Inupiat people of the Kobuk River area before the arrival of Europeans.

In 1838, the Russian explorer Malakov established a trading post in Nulato.

The Kokukuk River people massacred a large part of the population of Nulato on February 16, 1851, during the Athapaskan uprising.

After the Alaska Purchase, a United States military telegraph line was constructed along the north side of the Yukon River. The gold rush along the Yukon River that began in 1884 brought many new diseases to the area and many people died. Our Lady of Snows Roman Catholic mission and school were opened in 1887 and many people moved to Nulato to be near the school. A measles epidemic and food shortages during 1900 reduced the population of the area by one-third. 1900 was also the peak year for steamboat travel on the Yukon River, with 46 boats in operation. That summer, two boats per day stopped at Nulato to purchase firewood.

Gold prospectors left the Yukon River area for Fairbanks and Nome in 1906. Lead mining began around neighboring Galena in 1919.

Nulato incorporated as a city in 1963. In 1981, housing was built at a new townsite 3 km (1.9 mi) from present Nulato.

== Geography ==
Nulato is located at 64°43′48″N 158°6′51″W (64.730011, -158.114101).

Nulato is on the west bank of the Yukon River, 53 km (33 mi) west of Galena, in the Nulato Hills. It is across the Yukon River from the Innoko National Wildlife Refuge.The area experiences a cold, continental climate with extreme temperature differences. Temperatures range from −70 °F (−57 °C) to 80 °F (27 °C). Average precipitation is 15.6 inches (400 mm), with 74 inches (1,900 mm) of snowfall annually.

According to the United States Census Bureau, the city has a total area of 44.8 square miles (116 km^{2}), of which, 42.7 square miles (111 km^{2}) of it is land and 2.0 square miles (5.2 km^{2}) of it (4.56%) is water.

== Transportation ==
The town is serviced by Nulato Airport which has regularly scheduled flights to Galena, Kaltag and Koyukuk.

== Education ==
The Yukon–Koyukuk School District operates the Andrew K. Demoski School in Nulato.

== Culture ==
Every other year, the people gather in Nulato to attend the week-long Stick Dance. It is celebrated on the years that it is not held in Kaltag, Alaska. People from all over the Athabascan region gather in the small village to attend the sacred dance that is done to celebrate the lives of lost loved ones and to appreciate the people that helped the family through the mourning process. This ceremony was started by a couple that lost their family in a tragic accident centuries ago. Friday night of the stick dance is the largest and most powerful night of that week, on this particular night the attendees sing 14 sacred songs and dance. This particular dance is called in the Athabascan language Meyegha Doh Sealyihe (the dance before the stick dance) after this dance they put a decorated stick up in the center of the gathering place and chant while going around the stick (chants- Heeyo Heeyo Heeyo Hey Heeyo Heeyo Heeyo Hey). Nulato residents are predominantly Koyukon Athabascan with trapping and subsistence lifestyle.

== Demographics ==
Historical population
| Census | Pop. | Note | %± |
|---|---|---|---|
| 1890 | 118 | | — |
| 1900 | 281 | | 138.1% |
| 1910 | 230 | | −18.1% |
| 1920 | 258 | | 12.2% |
| 1930 | 204 | | −20.9% |
| 1940 | 113 | | −44.6% |
| 1950 | 176 | | 55.8% |
| 1960 | 283 | | 60.8% |
| 1970 | 308 | | 8.8% |
| 1980 | 350 | | 13.6% |
| 1990 | 359 | | 2.6% |
| 2000 | 336 | | −6.4% |
| 2010 | 264 | | −21.4% |
| 2020 | 239 | | −9.5% |
U.S. Decennial Census

Nulato residents are predominantly Koyukon, an Alaska Native Athabaskan people of the Athabaskan-speaking ethnolinguistic group.

=== 2020 census ===
As of the 2020 census, Nulato had a population of 239. The median age was 38.6 years. 28.5% of residents were under the age of 18 and 13.4% of residents were 65 years of age or older. For every 100 females there were 100.8 males, and for every 100 females age 18 and over there were 92.1 males age 18 and over.

0.0% of residents lived in urban areas, while 100.0% lived in rural areas.

There were 84 households in Nulato, of which 39.3% had children under the age of 18 living in them. Of all households, 28.6% were married-couple households, 23.8% were households with a male householder and no spouse or partner present, and 34.5% were households with a female householder and no spouse or partner present. About 28.6% of all households were made up of individuals and 14.3% had someone living alone who was 65 years of age or older.

There were 100 housing units, of which 16.0% were vacant. The homeowner vacancy rate was 0.0% and the rental vacancy rate was 0.0%.

Racial composition as of the 2020 census
| Race | Number | Percent |
|---|---|---|
| White | 17 | 7.1% |
| Black or African American | 1 | 0.4% |
| American Indian and Alaska Native | 169 | 70.7% |
| Asian | 2 | 0.8% |
| Native Hawaiian and Other Pacific Islander | 0 | 0.0% |
| Some other race | 0 | 0.0% |
| Two or more races | 50 | 20.9% |
| Hispanic or Latino (of any race) | 4 | 1.7% |

=== 2000 census ===
As of the census of 2000, there were 336 people, 91 households, and 71 families residing in the city. The population density was 7.9 inhabitants per square mile (3.1/km^{2}). There were 119 housing units at an average density of 2.8 per square mile (1.1/km^{2}). The racial makeup of the city was 5.06% White, 92.86% Native American, 0.60% from other races, and 1.49% from two or more races. 0.60% of the population were Hispanic or Latino of any race.

There were 91 households, out of which 51.6% had children under the age of 18 living with them, 36.3% were married couples living together, 27.5% had a female householder with no husband present, and 20.9% were non-families. 14.3% of all households were made up of individuals, and 1.1% had someone living alone who was 65 years of age or older. The average household size was 3.69 and the average family size was 4.13.

In the city, the age distribution of the population shows 41.7% under the age of 18, 10.7% from 18 to 24, 25.0% from 25 to 44, 15.5% from 45 to 64, and 7.1% who were 65 years of age or older. The median age was 23 years. For every 100 females, there were 97.6 males. For every 100 females age 18 and over, there were 102.1 males.

The median income for a household in the city was $25,114, and the median income for a family was $26,944. Males had a median income of $24,375 versus $25,313 for females. The per capita income for the city was $8,966. About 16.7% of families and 18.1% of the population were below the poverty line, including 20.0% of those under age 18 and 4.5% of those age 65 or over.

=== Koyukon Athabascans ===
The Koyukon Athabascans had seasonal camps in this area and moved when the wild game migrated. There were 12 summer fish camps located on the Yukon River between the Koyukuk River and the Nowitna River.

== Notable people ==
- Poldine Carlo (1920–2018), Koyukon Athabascan author, born in Nulato
- Michael J. Stickman, First Chief of the Nulato Tribal Council
