= List of airports in Sierra Leone =

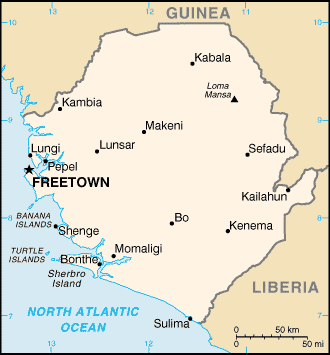
Map of Sierra Leone

This is a list of airports in Sierra Leone, sorted by location.

Sierra Leone, officially the Republic of Sierra Leone, is a country in West Africa. It is bordered by Guinea to the north, Liberia to the southeast, and the Atlantic Ocean to the southwest. Sierra Leone covers a total area of 71,740 km^{2} (27,699 sq mi) and has a population estimated at 6.4 million. The country is a constitutional republic comprising three provinces and the Western Area, which are further divided into fourteen districts. The capital and largest city of Sierra Leone is Freetown.

The country's main international airport is Freetown International Airport, located across the Sierra Leone River from Sierra Leone's capital, Freetown. All scheduled commercial airline services in Sierra Leone come to or take off from Lungi.

== Airports ==
Names shown in bold indicate the airport has scheduled passenger service on commercial airlines.

Location served	ICAO	IATA	Airport name
Bo	GFBO	KBS	**Bo Airport**
Sherbro, Bonthe	GFBN	BTE	Sherbro International Airport
Freetown	GFHA	HGS	**Hastings Airport**
Freetown	GFLL	FNA	**Freetown International Airport**
Gbangbatok	GFGK	GBK	Gbangbatok Airport
Kabala	GFKB	KBA	Kabala Airport
Kenema	GFKE	KEN	**Kenema Airport**
Yengema	GFYE	WYE	**Yengema Airport**

== See also ==
- Transport in Sierra Leone
- List of airports by ICAO code: G#GF - Sierra Leone
- Wikipedia: WikiProject Aviation/Airline destination lists: Africa#Sierra Leone
