= KDQ =

KDQ or kdq may refer to:

- Kamberatoro Airport (IATA:KDQ), Papua New Guinea
- Koch language (ISO 639-3:kdq), spoken in India and Bangladesh
