= Babiana lanata =

Scientific classification
- Kingdom: Plantae
- Clade: Tracheophytes
- Clade: Angiosperms
- Clade: Monocots
- Order: Asparagales
- Family: Iridaceae
- Genus: Babiana
- Species: B. lanata

Binomial name
- Babiana lanata Goldblatt & J.C.Manning

Species of flowering plant

Babiana lanata is a species of geophytic, perennial flowering plant in the family Iridaceae. The species is endemic to the Northern Cape and is part of the Namaqualand strandveld. It occurs on the Namaqualand coastal plain between Kleinzee and Port Nolloth and has a range of 460 km^{2}. The species is threatened by diamond mining activities, approximately 60% of its habitat within 5 km of the coast has already been disturbed.
