= KMH =

KMH is a three-letter abbreviation that may refer to:

- Johan Pienaar Airport, an airport in Northern Cape province, South Africa (IATA code)
- Kate Miller-Heidke, Australian singer and songwriter
- Kelli Maria Hand, American techno musician and DJ
- KMH Studios, former name of Ingrid Studios, a recording studio in Stockholm, Sweden
- Royal College of Music, Stockholm (Kungliga Musikhögskolan i Stockholm), music school in Sweden

kmh may refer to:

- Kalam language, a language of Papua New Guinea (ISO 639-3 code)

km/h may refer to:

- kilometres per hour, a unit of speed
- km/h (TV series), a Quebec television sitcom
