= KLZ (disambiguation) =

KLZ is a commercial radio station in Denver, Colorado, U.S.

KLZ or klz can also refer to:

- License plate code for Altmarkkreis Salzwedel district, Saxony-Anhalt, Germany
- Kabola language, Papuan language spoken in Indonesia
- Kleinzee Airport, near Kleinzee, Northern Cape, South Africa
