= Buffels River =

Buffals River can refer to:

- Buffels River (Eastern Cape), river in the Eastern Cape province of South Africa
- Buffels River (KwaZulu-Natal), river in KwaZulu-Natal, South Africa
- Buffels River (Northern Cape), river in the Northern Cape province of South Africa, see List of rivers of South Africa
- Buffels River (Western Cape), river in the Western Cape province of South Africa, tributary of the Groot River
