= Brazil, Northern Cape =

Coordinates: 29.818357°S 17.083539°E

Brazil in red with the other potential nuclear sites in blue

Brazil is a coastal site near Kleinzee in the Namakwa district of the Northern Cape province of South Africa. The site is approximately 85 km west of the town (and district seat) of Springbok.

The significance of this locale is that it has been identified as a possible future nuclear reactor site by South African electricity utility Eskom.
