= KJU =

KJU or kju may refer to:

- IATA code for Kamiraba Airport, Papua New Guinea
- Kim Jong Un, Supreme Leader of North Korea since 2011
- 2000s album by British trumpeter Mark Charig
