= KNR =

KNR may refer to:

- Jam Airport, in Bandar Kangan, Iran; IATA airport code KNR
- Kalaallit Nunaata Radioa, Greenlandic Broadcasting Corporation
- Kaningra language, ISO 639-3 language code KNR
- Kannur, Kerala, India; UN/LOCODE IN-KL-KNR
- Kensal Rise railway station, England, station code
- Kunar Province, Afghanistan; ISO 3166-2:AF code AF-KNR
