= Kaltag Airport =

- IATA: KAL; ICAO: PAKV; FAA LID: KAL

Summary
- Airport type: Public
- Owner: State of Alaska DOT&PF - Northern Region
- Serves: Kaltag, Alaska
- Elevation AMSL: 181 ft (55 m)
- Coordinates: 64°19′08″N 158°44′29″W

Map
- Location of airport in Alaska

Runways
Direction	Length		Surface
Direction	ft	m	Surface
3/21	3,986	1,215	Gravel
- Source: Federal Aviation Administration

Kaltag Airport (IATA: KAL, ICAO: PAKV, FAA LID: KAL) is a state-owned public-use airport located one nautical mile (1.85 km) southwest of the central business district of Kaltag, a city in the Yukon-Koyukuk Census Area of the U.S. state of Alaska.

== Facilities ==
Kaltag Airport covers an area of 292 acres (118 ha) which contains one runway (3/21) with a gravel surface measuring 3,986 x 100 ft (1,215 x 30 m).

== Airlines and destinations ==
The following airlines offer scheduled passenger service at this airport:

Airlines	Destinations
Everts Air	Fairbanks
Wright Air Service	Fairbanks, Galena, Nulato, Ruby

=== Top destinations ===
Busiest domestic routes out of KAL (June 2010 - May 2011)
Rank	City	Passengers	Carriers
1	(Alaska) Galena, AK	1,000	Frontier Flying
2	(Alaska) Fairbanks, AK	1,000	Arctic Circle, Hageland

== See also ==
- List of airports in Alaska
