= Air Kaikoura =

Airline of New Zealand

IATA	ICAO	Call sign
-	-	—
- Founded: 1983
- Hubs: Kaikoura Airport
- Fleet size: 3
- Headquarters: Kaikōura, New Zealand
- Key people: Murray Hamilton (Manager)
- Website: https://www.airkaikoura.co.nz//

Air Kaikoura is a small New Zealand airline offering scenic flights with light aircraft in the Kaikōura area. It also operates charter services around New Zealand. The company was founded in 1983. They saw the potential with Whale watching fights and started offering services using a Piper PA-28 Cherokee and Cessna 206.

== Services ==
Following the 2016 Kaikōura earthquake with road access closed, Air Kaikoura saw the need to help out the region's isolation from the rest of New Zealand. From 4 December 2016 to 15 December 2017 the airline provided a shuttle service to Parikawa to allow locals to access the area. Air Kaikoura flew scheduled services to Wellington from 15 May 2020 to February 2021 using a GA-8 Airvan which could take seven passengers. The duration of the flight was 50 minutes. Currently, the airline offers scenic flights and charters surrounding the Kaikōura area.

== Fleet ==
As of November 2020 the Air Kaikoura fleet consists of the following aircraft:

Air Kaikoura's fleet
Aircraft	Total	Orders	Passengers
GippsAero GA8 Airvan	2		7
Cessna 172	1		4
Aeropro Eurofox	1		1
Total	4		
