= Grootmis =

- Location within Northern Cape Location within South Africa
- Coordinates: 29.650°S 17.081°E
- Country: South Africa
- Province: Northern Cape
- District: Namakwa
- Municipality: Nama Khoi
- Time zone: UTC+2 (SAST)

Grootmis is a settlement near the mouth of the Buffels River in South Africa. The name is Afrikaans, meaning "large mist", and it is named this because the fog hangs over the coastline for days at a time.
