= Michael Stickman =

Michael J. Stickman is the First Chief of the Nulato Tribal Council, an Athabaskan tribe in Nulato, Alaska. Stickman, who is Koyukon Athabascan, is seated on the Arctic Council. He also serves as the director of Nulato Hills Enterprises, the for-profit enterprise of the Nulato Tribal Council that provides transportation services, language education, and business planning.

Stickman was one of 60 Alaska Native tribal leaders who oppose the US Bureau of Land Management's proposal to open tracts of protected lands in the Bering Sea-Western Interior region of Alaska to mining. Stickman said, "It is our responsibility to take care of land and resources that mean so much to our peoples' way of life. Our ancestors instilled these values about showing respect and caring for the land."

== See also ==
- List of Alaska Native tribal entities
