= Koutiala Airport =

Koutiala Airport Aéroport Koutiala
- IATA: KTX; ICAO: GAKO

Summary
- Serves: Koutiala
- Location: Mali
- Elevation AMSL: 1,240 ft / 378 m
- Coordinates: 12°21′03″N 5°25′50″W

Map
- Location within Mali

Runways
Direction	Length		Surface
Direction	ft	m	Surface
07/25	3,940	1,200	Dirt
- Source:GCM Google Maps

Koutiala Airport (IATA: KTX, ICAO: GAKO) (French: Aéroport Koutiala) is an airstrip serving Koutiala in Mali. It is located 5 kilometres (3 mi) southeast of the town center.

Runway is poorly defined. Length is between last visible markers and is approximate.
