= Buffels River (Northern Cape) =

River in South Africa

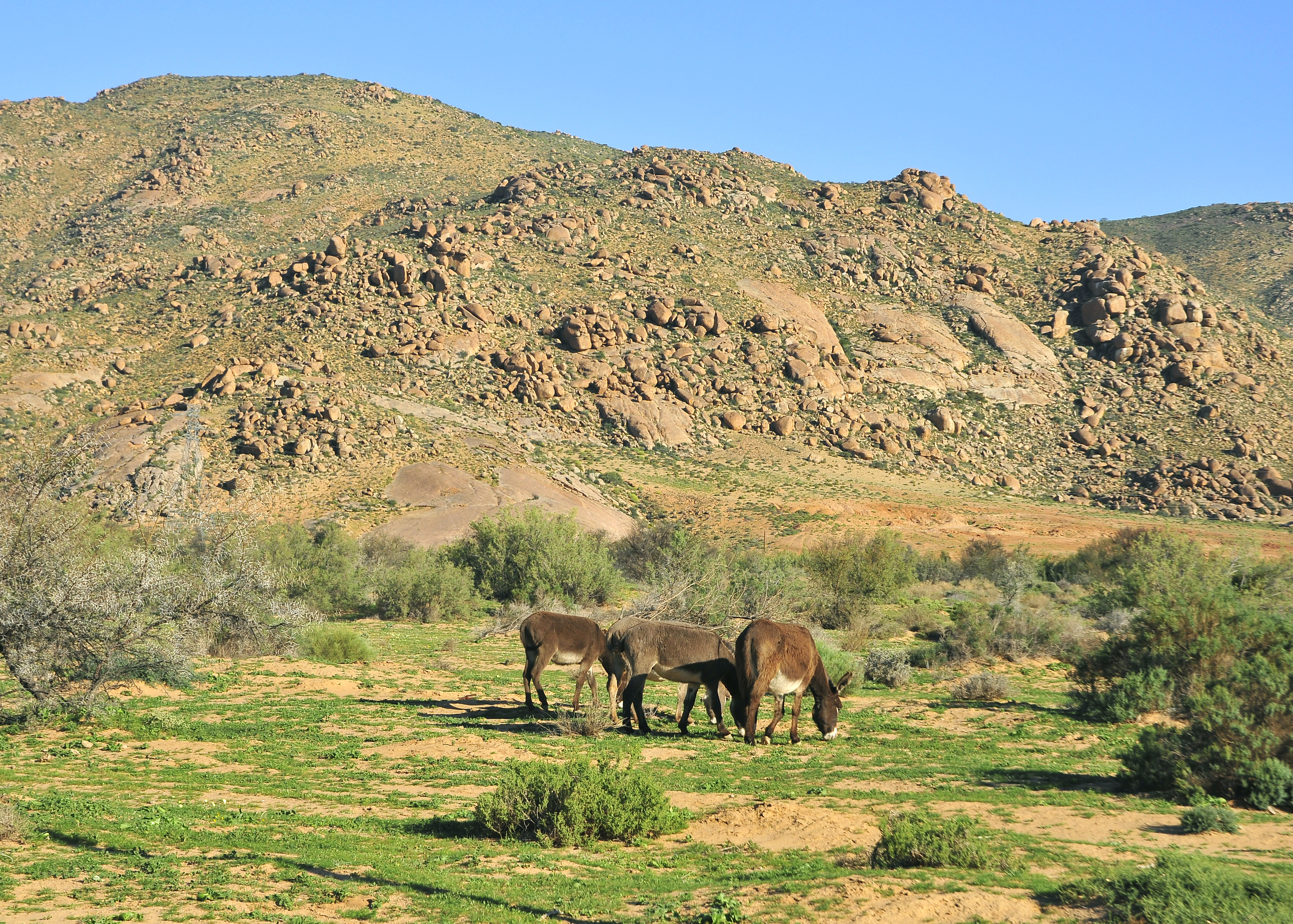

- Location of the Buffels River in Northern Cape, South Africa

- Mouth of the Buffels River near kleinzee

Location
- Country: South Africa
- Province: Northern Cape

Physical characteristics
- Source: Kamiesberg region
  - location: Northern Cape
- Mouth: Atlantic Ocean
  - location: Near Kleinzee
  - coordinates: 29°40′35″S 17°3′8″E
- Basin size: ~9,250 km²

Basin features
- River system: Buffels River system

Buffels River is a river that flows only for a short period after rainfall and is dry for most of the year. It is located in the Northern Cape province of South Africa. It flows through the arid Namaqualand region and generally drains westwards towards the Atlantic Ocean near Kleinzee. The river is made up of highly irregular flow patterns, it depends mainly on seasonal rainfall in its catchment area.

== Course and basin ==
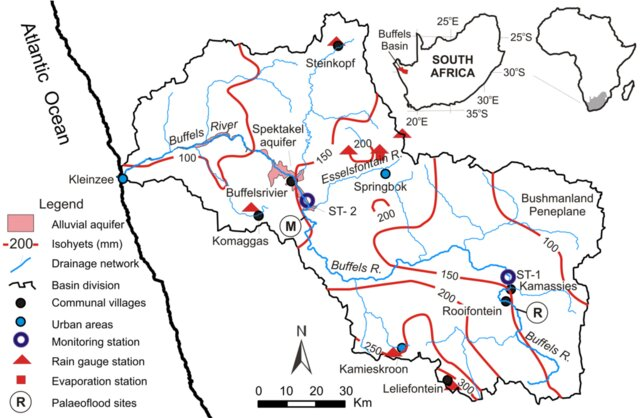
River catchment illustrating the drainage network and rainfall isohyets (lines connecting points receiving similar rainfall over a specified time period).

The Buffels River originates in the inland highlands of the Northern Cape and flows westwards through Namaqualand, it passes through settlements such as Springbok, Nababeep, and Okiep before reaching the Atlantic coast near Kleinzee, where it may form a temporary estuary during flood periods. The total course of the river is around 250 km (160 mi) in length. In its lower reaches, the river is usually dry and only flows after heavy rainfall. It is highly ephemeral, flowing strictly during flash floods and heavy rains, and remains completely dry for most of the year.

== Hydrology ==
The Buffels River is an ephemeral river that flows only after rain has fallen. It drains a catchment area of approximately 9,000–9,500 km² and it primarily depends on austral winter rainfall between May and September, although the eastern part of the catchment experiences summer rainfall associated with thunderstorms. Rainfall in the region ranges between 100 mm and 300 mm annually, making the river highly prone to flash floods followed by long dry periods. The majority of floods occur in the winter rainfall season, although occasional summer rainfall may cause flash floods.

== Geology and Environment ==
The river flows through the Namaqualand geological province, which is dominated by ancient granite, gneiss, and metamorphic rocks. The region is semi-arid with sparse vegetation adapted to drought conditions. Because the soil is shallow and rocky, it cannot retain much water, so rainwater runs off quickly after rainfall.

== Human use ==
Communities within the Buffels River catchment rely primarily on groundwater resources associated with the river's alluvial deposits. Historically, the catchment has supported copper mining around Springbok, Okiep and Nababeep, as well as livestock farming. Water-resource management in the basin focuses on the sustainable use of limited surface water and groundwater supplies in an arid environment.

== Scientific significance ==
The Buffels River is frequently cited in studies of ephemeral rivers, groundwater recharge and dryland hydrology in southern Africa. Its catchment provides an important example of how intermittent rivers function in arid climates and has been used in research on water-resource management, geomorphology and ecological processes in the Namaqualand region.

== See also ==
Orange River Namaqualand List of rivers of South Africa
