= Koyukuk Airport =

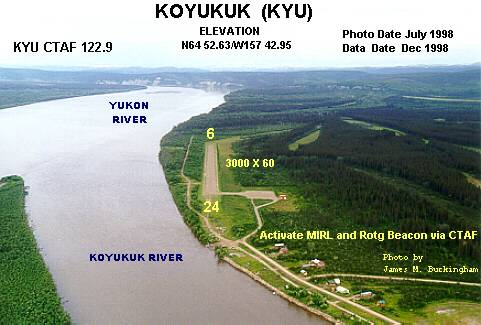
- IATA: KYU; ICAO: PFKU; FAA LID: KYU

Summary
- Airport type: Public
- Owner: State of Alaska DOT&PF - Northern Region
- Serves: Koyukuk, Alaska
- Elevation AMSL: 149 ft (45 m)
- Coordinates: 64°52′33″N 157°43′50″W

Map
- Location of airport in Alaska

Runways
Direction	Length		Surface
Direction	ft	m	Surface
6/24	4,000	1,219	Gravel/dirt

Statistics
- Enplanements (2007): 1,018
- Source: Federal Aviation Administration

Koyukuk Airport (IATA: KYU, ICAO: PFKU, FAA LID: KYU) is a state-owned public-use airport located in Koyukuk, a city in the Yukon-Koyukuk Census Area of the U.S. state of Alaska.

As per Federal Aviation Administration records, this airport had 1,018 passenger boardings (enplanements) in calendar year 2007, a decrease of 22% from the 1,305 enplanements in 2006.

== Facilities ==
Koyukuk Airport covers an area of 287 acres (116 ha) at an elevation of 149 feet (45 m) above mean sea level. It has one runway (6/24) with a gravel and dirt surface measuring 4,000 x 75 ft (1,219 x 23 m). The runway was extended and widened from its former size of 3,000 by 60 feet. The runway is on the banks of Yukon River.

== Airlines and destinations ==
The following airlines offer scheduled passenger service at this airport:

Airlines	Destinations
Wright Air Service	Fairbanks, Galena, Nulato

== See also ==
- List of airports in Alaska
