= Kaikoura Airport =

- IATA: KBZ; ICAO: NZKI

Summary
- Airport type: Public
- Operator: Kaikōura District Council
- Location: Kaikōura, South Island, New Zealand
- Elevation AMSL: 19 ft / 6 m
- Coordinates: 42°25′30″S 173°36′08″E

Map
- Location on map of New Zealand

Runways
Direction	Length		Surface
Direction	m	ft	Surface
05/23	700	2,297	Bitumen
05/23	615	2,018	Grass
- Source: NZAIP Volume 4 AD

Kaikoura Airport (IATA: KBZ, ICAO: NZKI) is an uncontrolled aerodrome located 4 nautical miles (7.4 km; 4.6 mi) southwest of Kaikōura at Peketa in the South Island of New Zealand.

== History ==
The Airport was opened in 1964. It was constructed by council staff at a cost of 4000 pounds. It had an original grass runway of 575 metres (1,886 ft). In 1983, the Kaikoura Aero Club was formed. In late 1995, the runway was sealed for the increased traffic and to protect it from damage caused by rabbits.

In 1990–91, Air Charter Ltd operated scheduled flights to Christchurch using Cessna 210 aircraft. On 19 July 2004, Sounds Air started twice daily services from Wellington using its Airvan aircraft. But these also ended as of May 2009 as they were not a success.

On 21 November 2016, Sounds Air began a temporary daily Monday to Friday air service from Kaikōura to Blenheim and Christchurch, after the main transport links to the town were severed by the 2016 Kaikōura earthquake. The service was planned to run for at least three weeks, using the company's Cessna Caravan. It was extended to the end of December 2017.

Wings Over Whales, a scenic flight operator based at Kaikōura offers whale watching and other charter flights.

Air Kaikoura flew scheduled services to Wellington from 15 May 2020 using a GA-8 Airvan which could take seven passengers. The service was discontinued in February 2021 due to lack of demand.

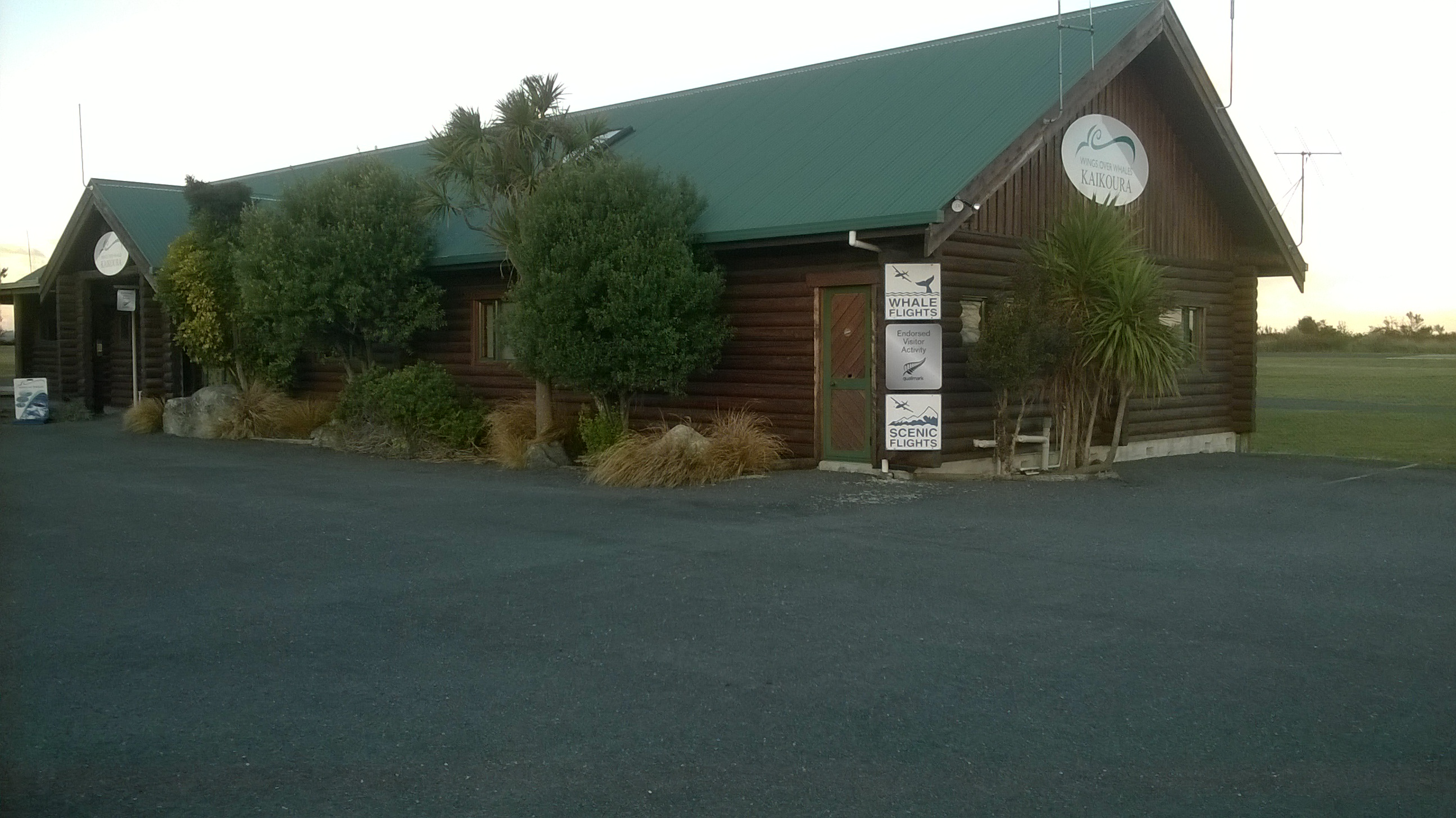
The new Kaikoura airport building log cabin style in 2016

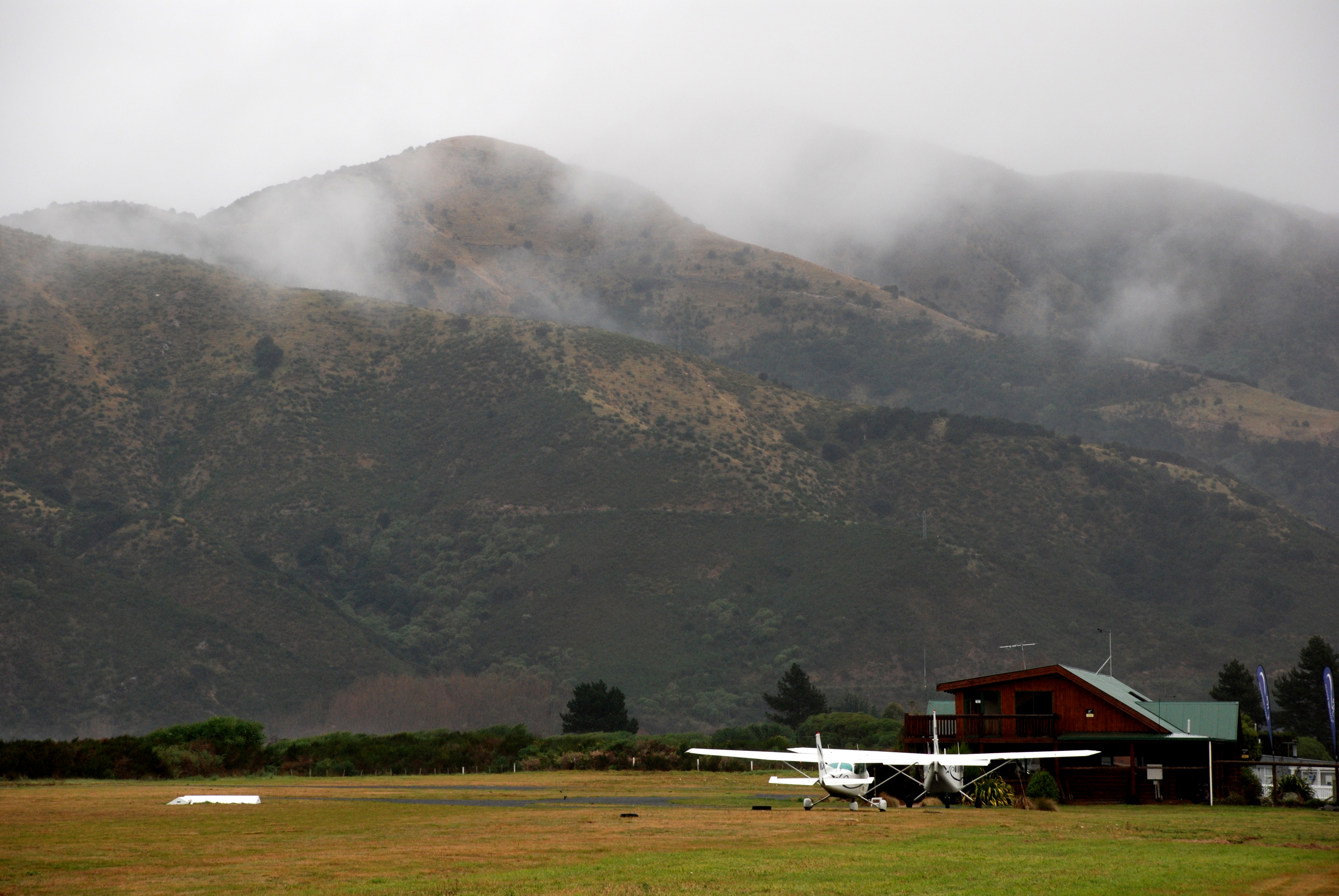
Kaikoura airport, Canterbury, New Zealand, June 2007

== Operational information ==
- Airfield elevation: 19 feet (6 m) AMSL
- Runway 05/23: 700 by 10 metres (2,297 ft × 33 ft) bitumen PCN 18
- Runway 05/23: 615 by 25 metres (2,018 ft × 82 ft) grass ESWL 1090

The aerodrome is operated by Kaikōura District Council and is available for general use without the permission of the operator.

== See also ==
- List of airports in New Zealand
- List of airlines of New Zealand
- Transport in New Zealand
