= Edward G. Pitka Sr. Airport =

Edward G. Pitka Sr. Airport (former Galena Air Force Base)
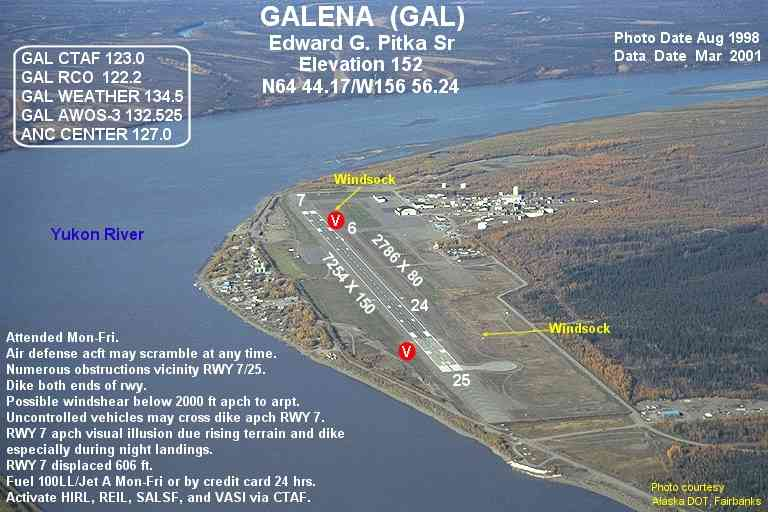
- IATA: GAL; ICAO: PAGA; FAA LID: GAL

Summary
- Airport type: Public
- Owner: State of Alaska DOT&PF – Northern Region
- Serves: Galena, Alaska
- Elevation AMSL: 154 ft (47 m)
- Coordinates: 64°44′10″N 156°56′15″W

Map
- Location of airport in Alaska

Runways
Direction	Length		Surface
Direction	ft	m	Surface
8/26	6,000	1,829	Asphalt/Concrete
6/24	2,600	792	Gravel Ski Strip

Statistics (2022)
- Aircraft operations: 19,000
- Based aircraft: 0
- Source: Federal Aviation Administration

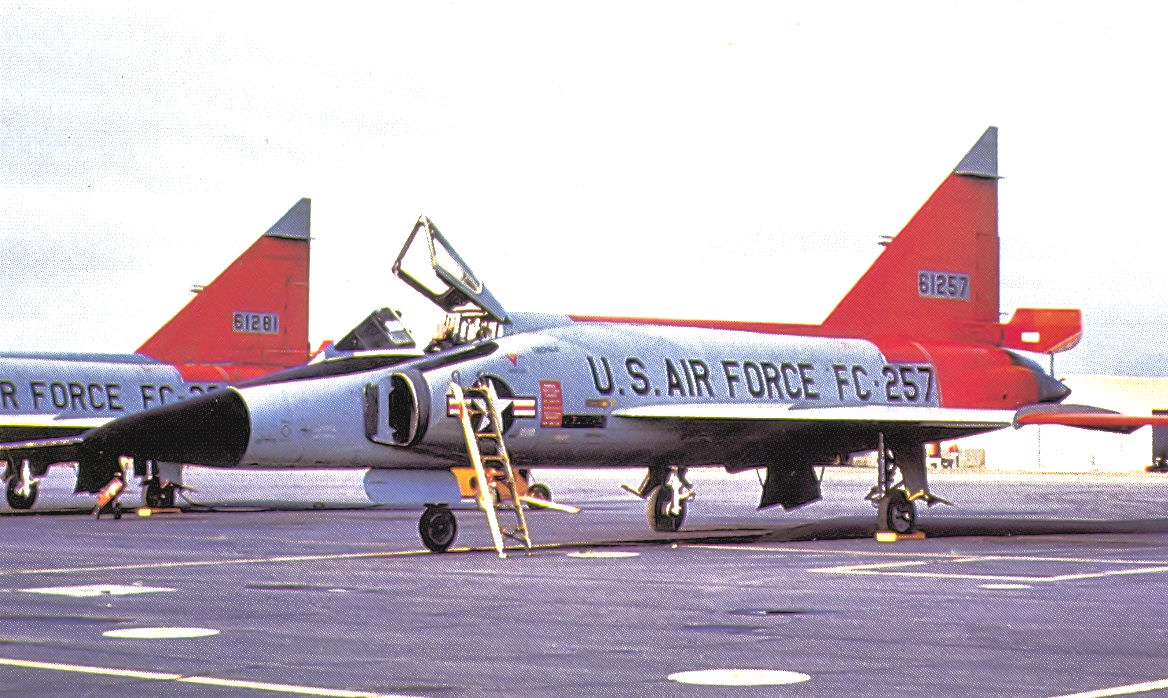
Galena Airport was used by the USAF 317th Fighter-Interceptor Squadron at Elmendorf AFB as a forward-deployed Base to intercept Soviet aircraft intruding on United States airspace over the Bering Sea. Depicted: Convair F-102 Delta Dagger, 1965.

Edward G. Pitka Sr. Airport (IATA: GAL, ICAO: PAGA, FAA LID: GAL) is a state-owned public-use airport located in Galena, a city in the Yukon-Koyukuk Census Area of the U.S. state of Alaska.

As per Federal Aviation Administration records, the airport had 7,784 passenger boardings (enplanements) in calendar year 2008, 7,447 enplanements in 2009, and 12,421 in 2010. It is included in the National Plan of Integrated Airport Systems for 2011–2015, which categorized it as a non-primary commercial service airport (between 2,500 and 10,000 enplanements per year) based on enplanements in 2008; however, it qualifies as a primary commercial service airport based on enplanements in 2010.

== History ==
As Galena Airport, it was used as a military transport base during World War II, facilitating the transit of lend-lease aircraft to the Soviet Union.

As Galena Air Force Station, it was used by the USAF during the Cold War as an interceptor base for aircraft patrolling the western areas of Alaska. It was downsized in 1993, but the military airfield is maintained by a private contractor as a weather/emergency diversion airfield since Regular Air Force fighter-interceptor alert operations ended. It is now known as Galena Forward Operating Location.

== Facilities and aircraft ==
Edward G. Pitka Sr Airport covers an area of 1,250 acres (506 ha) at an elevation of 154 feet (47 m) above mean sea level. It has two runways: 8/26 is 6,000 by 100 feet (1,829 x 30 m) with an asphalt and concrete surface; 6/24 is 2,600 by 50 feet (792 x 15 m) with a gravel ski strip surface.

The airport also sports a ski-jump takeoff ramp at one end and provisions for arresting gear (see picture, ski jump at 07 end) at the other, a leftover from the Cold War years as Galena Air Force Base, as tactical aircraft required more landing and takeoff space than was available on the runway.

For the 12-month period ending December 31, 2022, the airport had 19,000 aircraft operations, an average of 52 per day: 68% general aviation, 16% scheduled commercial, 11% military, and 5% air taxi. At that time there was no aircraft based at the airport.

== Airlines and destinations ==
=== Passenger ===
Airlines	Destinations
Everts Air	Fairbanks
Wright Air Service	Fairbanks, Huslia, Kaltag, Koyukuk, Nulato, Ruby

=== Top destinations ===
Busiest domestic routes out of GAL (July 2023 – June 2024)
Rank	City	Passengers	Carriers
1	Fairbanks, AK	7,180	Everts, Wright
2	Nulato, AK	1,690	Wright
3	Huslia, AK	1,110	Wright
4	Kaltag, AK	1,010	Wright
5	Koyukuk, AK	460	Wright
6	Ruby, AK	280	Wright

== See also ==
- Northwest Staging Route
- List of airports in Alaska
- Alaska World War II Army Airfields
- Air Transport Command
