= Jam Airport =

Airport in Iran

- IATA: KNR; ICAO: OIBJ

Summary
- Airport type: Public
- Location: Jam, Iran
- Elevation AMSL: 2,172 ft / 662 m
- Coordinates: 27°49.24′N 052°21.12′E

Map
- Shown within Iran

Runways
| Direction | Length | | Surface |
| Direction | ft | m | Surface |
|---|---|---|---|
| 11/29 | 7,892 | 2,405 | Asphalt |
- Sources: DoD FLIP

Jam Airport (IATA: KNR, ICAO: OIBJ) is an airport serving the cities of Jam and nearby Bandar Kangan in Iran's Bushehr province.
