= Kabala Airport =

- IATA: KBA; ICAO: GFKB

Summary
- Serves: Kabala
- Location: Sierra Leone
- Coordinates: 9°38′20″N 11°30′55″W
- Interactive map of Kabala Airport
- Airport coordinates

Kabala Airport (IATA: KBA, ICAO: GFKB) is a general aviation municipal airport and heliport located in Kabala, in the Koinadugu District of Sierra Leone. The Sierra Leone Transportation Authority is in the process of expanding the airport to include a landing strip and other facilities. This will allow non-commercial and small planes to use the airport and will facilitate travel throughout the Northern Province.
