= Kenema Airport =

Airport in Sierra Leone

- IATA: KEN; ICAO: GFKE

Summary
- Airport type: Public
- Serves: Kenema
- Elevation AMSL: 485 ft / 148 m
- Coordinates: 7°53′50″N 11°10′25″W

Map

Runways
Direction	Length		Surface
Direction	ft	m	Surface
04/22	3,770	1,150	Unpaved
- Source: Google Maps

Kenema Airport (IATA: KEN, ICAO: GFKE) is an airport located in Kenema, the third largest of Sierra Leone. The airport is mostly used for domestic aircraft to the city. It is the largest and most important airport in Kenema District as well as one of the busiest airports in the country. The airport is operated by the Sierra Leonean Airports Authority.

== See also ==
- Transport in Sierra Leone
