= Nulato Airport =

Airport in Alaska, United States

- IATA: NUL; ICAO: PANU; FAA LID: NUL

Summary
- Airport type: Public
- Owner: State of Alaska DOT&PF - Northern Region
- Serves: Nulato, Alaska
- Elevation AMSL: 399 ft (122 m)
- Coordinates: 64°43′46″N 158°04′27″W

Map
- Location of airport in Alaska

Runways
Direction	Length		Surface
Direction	ft	m	Surface
2/20	4,000	1,219	Gravel
- Source: Federal Aviation Administration

Nulato Airport (IATA: NUL, ICAO: PANU, FAA LID: NUL) is a state-owned public-use airport located one nautical mile (2 km) northeast of the central business district of Nulato, a city in the Yukon-Koyukuk Census Area of the U.S. state of Alaska.

As per Federal Aviation Administration records, the airport had 2,917 passenger boardings (enplanements) in calendar year 2008, 2,833 enplanements in 2009, and 3,404 in 2010. It is included in the National Plan of Integrated Airport Systems for 2011–2015, which categorized it as a non-primary commercial service airport (between 2,500 and 10,000 enplanements per year).

== Facilities ==
Nulato Airport covers an area of 146 acres (59 ha) at an elevation of 399 feet (122 m) above mean sea level. It has one runway designated 2/20 with a gravel surface measuring 4,000 by 100 feet (1,219 x 30 m).

== Airlines and destinations ==
Wright Air Service is the main airline that operates passenger flights to and from Nulato Airport. Cargo services are provided by Astral Aviation.

=== Top destinations ===
Main domestic routes out of NUL (January - December 2023)
Rank	City	Passengers
1	(Alaska) Fairbanks, AK	1,160
2	(Alaska) Galena, AK	1,030

== See also ==
- List of airports in Alaska
