= Johan Pienaar Airport =

- IATA: KMH; ICAO: FAKU

Summary
- Airport type: Public
- Serves: Kuruman, South Africa
- Elevation AMSL: 4,382 ft / 1,336 m
- Coordinates: 27°27′24″S 023°24′41″E

Map
- Location in the Northern Cape KMH (South Africa)

Runways
Direction	Length		Surface
Direction	m	ft	Surface
02/20	1,700	5,578	Asphalt
- Source: DAFIF

Johan Pienaar Airport (IATA: KMH, ICAO: FAKU) is an airport serving Kuruman, a town in Northern Cape province, South Africa.
