= Kleinzee Airport =

Kleinsee Airport
- IATA: KLZ; ICAO: FAKZ

Summary
- Airport type: Public
- Location: Kleinzee, Namakwa District Municipality, Northern Cape, South Africa
- Elevation AMSL: 270 ft (82 m)
- Coordinates: 29°41.0′S 017°05.6′E

Map
- Location in the Northern Cape KLZ (South Africa)

Runways
Direction	Length		Surface
Direction	m	ft	Surface
02/20	1,500	4,921	Gravel/Tar
- Sources: South African AIP

Kleinsee Airport or Kleinzee Airport (IATA: KLZ, ICAO: FAKZ) is an airport serving Kleinzee (also spelled Kleinsee), a town in the Northern Cape province in South Africa.

== Facilities ==
The airport resides at an elevation of 270 feet (82 m) above mean sea level. It has one runway designated 02/20 with a gravel and tar surface measuring 1,500 by 30 metres (4,921 ft × 98 ft).
