= Bo Airport =

Airport in Sierra Leone

- IATA: KBS; ICAO: GFBO

Summary
- Airport type: Public
- Operator: Sierra Leonean Airports Authority
- Serves: Bo
- Elevation AMSL: 328 ft / 100 m
- Coordinates: 07°56′38″N 11°45′42″W

Map
- Location within Sierra Leone

Runways
Direction	Length		Surface
Direction	ft	m	Surface
04/22	4,003	1,220	Dirt
- Coordinates from Flight Stats; Other information from Great Circle Mapper

Bo Airport (IATA: KBS, ICAO: GFBO) is a regional airport located in Bo, the second largest city of Sierra Leone. It is mainly used for regional and diplomatic aircraft to Bo District. The airport is operated by the Sierra Leonean Airports Authority.
