= Kaltag, Alaska =

Kaltag Ggaał Doh
- City
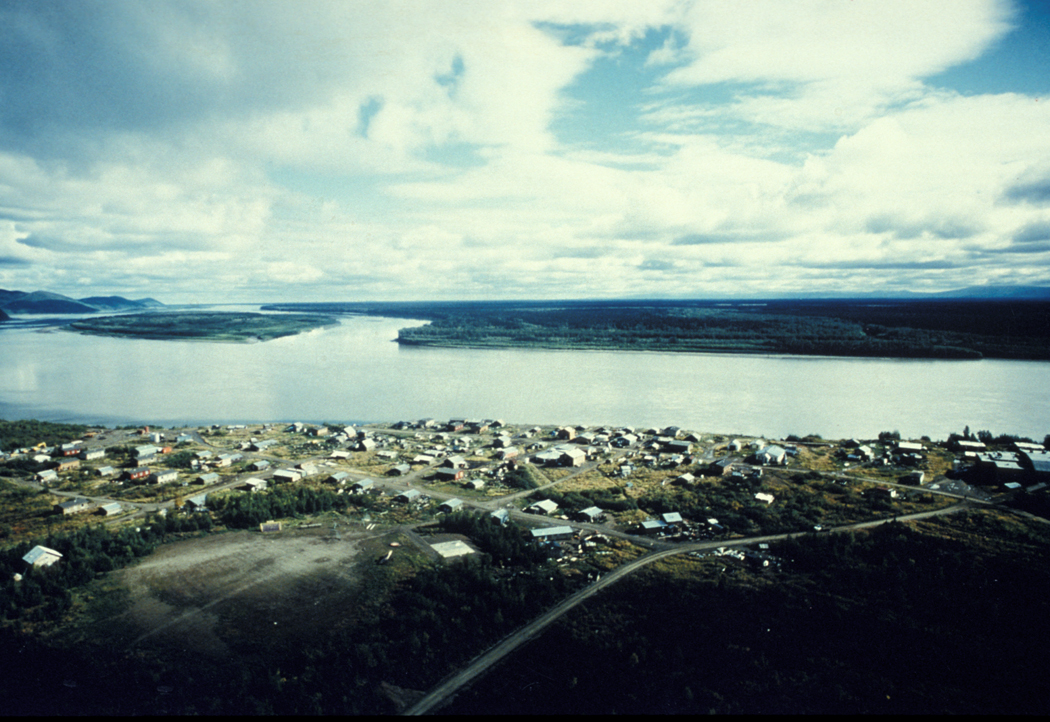
- Aerial view of Kaltag and the Yukon flats

- Location within Alaska
- Coordinates: 64°19′31″N 158°43′37″W
- Country: United States
- State: Alaska
- Census Area: Yukon-Koyukuk
- Incorporated: June 6, 1969

Government
  - Mayor: Violet Burnham
  - State senator: Click Bishop (R)
  - State rep.: Mike Cronk (R)

Area
  - Total: 27.56 sq mi (71.37 km^{2})
  - Land: 21.64 sq mi (56.05 km^{2})
  - Water: 5.92 sq mi (15.32 km^{2})
- Elevation: 98 ft (30 m)

Population (2020)
  - Total: 158
  - Density: 7.3/sq mi (2.82/km^{2})
- Time zone: UTC−9 (Alaska (AKST))
  - Summer (DST): UTC−8 (AKDT)
- ZIP code: 99748
- Area code: 907
- FIPS code: 02-37430
- GNIS feature ID: 1404379, 2419405

Kaltag (KAL-tag) (Russian: Калтаг; Koyukon: Ggaał Doh [qæːɬ toh]; Inupiaq: Qałtaq) is a city and village in Yukon-Koyukuk Census Area, Alaska, United States. As of the 2020 census, Kaltag had a population of 158.

== History ==
Kaltag was a Koyokon Athabascan area used as a cemetery for surrounding villages. It is located on an old portage trail which led west through the mountains to Unalakleet. The Athabascans had seasonal camps in the area and moved as the wild game migrated. There were 12 summer fish camps located on the Yukon River between the Koyukuk River and the Nowitna River.

Kaltag was named by Russians for a Koyokon man named Kaltaga.

There was a smallpox epidemic in 1839 that killed a large part of the population of the area.

After the Alaska Purchase, a United States military telegraph line was constructed along the north side of the Yukon River. A trading post opened around 1880, just before the gold rush of 1884–85. Steamboats on the Yukon, which supplied gold prospectors ran before and after 1900 with 46 boats in operation on the river in the peak year of 1900. A measles epidemic and food shortages during 1900 reduced the population of the area by one-third. The village Kaltag was established after the epidemic when survivors from three nearby villages moved to the area.

There was a minor gold rush in the area in the 1880s. In 1906, gold seekers left for Fairbanks or Nome; however, the Galena lead mines began operating in 1919. Kaltag was downriver from the mines and grew as a point on the transportation route for the mines. It declined in the 1940s as mining declined.

The old cemetery caved into the river around 1937. An airport and clinic were constructed during the 1960s.

Kaltag has a week long Stick Dance (memorial Potlatch) every two years that draws visitors from many neighboring villages. This Potlatch is sponsored by relatives of the recently deceased, in appreciation of those who helped during their time of mourning.

Much of the economy around Kaltag is based on subsistence hunting and fishing. Salmon, whitefish, moose, bear, waterfowl and berries are elements of the subsistence economy.

== Geography ==
Kaltag is located at 64°19′31″N 158°43′37″W (64.325145, -158.727030) and is on the west bank of the Yukon River, 120 km (75 mi) west of Galena of 27.4 square miles (71 km^{2}), of which, 23.3 square miles (60 km^{2}) of it is land and 4.1 square miles (11 km^{2}) of it (14.97%) is water.

=== Climate ===
The climate is transitional between the coast and interior.

Climate data for Kaltag, Alaska (1991–2020 normals, extremes 1944–present)
Month	Jan	Feb	Mar	Apr	May	Jun	Jul	Aug	Sep	Oct	Nov	Dec	Year
Record high °F (°C)	58 (14)	56 (13)	56 (13)	61 (16)	85 (29)	88 (31)	95 (35)	85 (29)	89 (32)	69 (21)	53 (12)	54 (12)	95 (35)
Mean maximum °F (°C)	32.0 (0.0)	36.8 (2.7)	38.0 (3.3)	51.7 (10.9)	74.4 (23.6)	80.5 (26.9)	83.0 (28.3)	75.4 (24.1)	65.9 (18.8)	49.9 (9.9)	32.7 (0.4)	30.1 (−1.1)	85.7 (29.8)
Mean daily maximum °F (°C)	4.3 (−15.4)	14.1 (−9.9)	21.2 (−6.0)	38.3 (3.5)	56.3 (13.5)	69.3 (20.7)	69.4 (20.8)	63.5 (17.5)	53.2 (11.8)	34.9 (1.6)	17.2 (−8.2)	7.8 (−13.4)	37.5 (3.0)
Daily mean °F (°C)	−4.0 (−20.0)	4.1 (−15.5)	9.7 (−12.4)	27.6 (−2.4)	45.1 (7.3)	57.4 (14.1)	59.3 (15.2)	54.3 (12.4)	44.5 (6.9)	27.8 (−2.3)	9.4 (−12.6)	0.1 (−17.7)	27.9 (−2.3)
Mean daily minimum °F (°C)	−12.3 (−24.6)	−6.0 (−21.1)	−1.9 (−18.8)	16.9 (−8.4)	33.9 (1.1)	45.5 (7.5)	49.3 (9.6)	45.0 (7.2)	35.7 (2.1)	20.7 (−6.3)	1.6 (−16.9)	−7.7 (−22.1)	18.4 (−7.6)
Mean minimum °F (°C)	−45.7 (−43.2)	−36.0 (−37.8)	−27.7 (−33.2)	−10.0 (−23.3)	18.1 (−7.7)	32.6 (0.3)	38.6 (3.7)	31.0 (−0.6)	20.7 (−6.3)	−1.1 (−18.4)	−25.9 (−32.2)	−38.1 (−38.9)	−47.4 (−44.1)
Record low °F (°C)	−60 (−51)	−57 (−49)	−46 (−43)	−30 (−34)	−11 (−24)	23 (−5)	29 (−2)	26 (−3)	8 (−13)	−17 (−27)	−43 (−42)	−50 (−46)	−60 (−51)
Average precipitation inches (mm)	1.02 (26)	1.29 (33)	1.45 (37)	1.39 (35)	1.02 (26)	1.65 (42)	2.24 (57)	3.38 (86)	3.17 (81)	2.78 (71)	1.43 (36)	0.72 (18)	21.54 (547)
Average precipitation days (≥ 0.01 in)	6.7	10.1	8.7	7.5	9.1	11.7	14.1	18.0	14.6	11.0	7.5	6.5	125.5
Source: NOAA

== Demographics ==
Historical population
Census	Pop.	Note	%±
1880	45		—
1910	141		—
1920	89		−36.9%
1930	137		53.9%
1940	140		2.2%
1950	121		−13.6%
1960	165		36.4%
1970	206		24.8%
1980	247		19.9%
1990	240		−2.8%
2000	230		−4.2%
2010	190		−17.4%
2020	158		−16.8%
U.S. Decennial Census

Kaltag first reported on the 1880 U.S. Census as an unincorporated Tinneh village. The census of 1890 combined Anvik and Kaltag under Anvik (with a combined population of 191). It did not appear again on the census separately until 1910. It formally incorporated in 1969.

=== 2020 census ===
As of the 2020 census, Kaltag had a population of 158. The median age was 38.3 years. 22.8% of residents were under the age of 18 and 13.9% of residents were 65 years of age or older. For every 100 females there were 129.0 males, and for every 100 females age 18 and over there were 130.2 males age 18 and over.

0.0% of residents lived in urban areas, while 100.0% lived in rural areas.

There were 62 households in Kaltag, of which 38.7% had children under the age of 18 living in them. Of all households, 35.5% were married-couple households, 30.6% were households with a male householder and no spouse or partner present, and 24.2% were households with a female householder and no spouse or partner present. About 30.7% of all households were made up of individuals and 8.0% had someone living alone who was 65 years of age or older.

There were 90 housing units, of which 31.1% were vacant. The homeowner vacancy rate was 17.0% and the rental vacancy rate was 0.0%.

Racial composition as of the 2020 census
Race	Number	Percent
White	11	7.0%
Black or African American	0	0.0%
American Indian and Alaska Native	132	83.5%
Asian	0	0.0%
Native Hawaiian and Other Pacific Islander	0	0.0%
Some other race	0	0.0%
Two or more races	15	9.5%
Hispanic or Latino (of any race)	0	0.0%

=== 2000 census ===
As of the census of 2000, there were 230 people, 69 households, and 52 families residing in the village. The population density was 9.9 inhabitants per square mile (3.8/km^{2}). There were 78 housing units at an average density of 3.3 per square mile (1.3/km^{2}). The racial makeup of the city was 12.61% White, 84.35% Native American, and 3.04% from two or more races.

There were 69 households, out of which 49.3% had children under the age of 18 living with them, 39.1% were married couples living together, 18.8% had a female householder with no husband present, and 23.2% were non-families. 21.7% of all households were made up of individuals, and 4.3% had someone living alone who was 65 years of age or older. The average household size was 3.33 and the average family size was 3.83.

In the village the age distribution of the population shows 37.0% under the age of 18, 12.2% from 18 to 24, 27.4% from 25 to 44, 15.7% from 45 to 64, and 7.8% who were 65 years of age or older. The median age was 25 years. For every 100 females, there were 132.3 males. For every 100 females age 18 and over, there were 126.6 males.

The median income for a household in the village was $29,167, and the median income for a family was $25,625. Males had a median income of $20,938 versus $48,750 for females. The per capita income for the village was $9,361. About 29.8% of families and 33.9% of the population were below the poverty line, including 45.7% of those under the age of eighteen and none of those 65 or over.

== Education ==
The Yukon–Koyukuk School District operates the Kaltag School.
