= Kleinzee =

- Location within Northern Cape Location within South Africa
- Coordinates: 29°40′40″S 17°04′12″E
- Country: South Africa
- Province: Northern Cape
- District: Namakwa
- Municipality: Nama Khoi - de Beers

Area
  - Total: 9.10 km^{2} (3.51 sq mi)

Population (2011)
  - Total: 728
  - Density: 80.0/km^{2} (207/sq mi)

Racial makeup (2011)
  - Black African: 18.1%
  - Coloured: 61.1%
  - Indian/Asian: 1.1%
  - White: 17.9%
  - Other: 1.8%

First languages (2011)
  - Afrikaans: 89.9%
  - English: 5.7%
  - Xhosa: 2.1%
  - Other: 2.3%
- Time zone: UTC+2 (SAST)
- PO box: 8282
- Area code: 027

Kleinzee (IPA: klˈe͡ɪnzi) is a small village on the west coast of Northern Cape province, South Africa, located at the mouth of the Buffels River and just south of Grootmis. It is 72 km southeast of Port Nolloth and 105 km west of Springbok. Previously a closed company town, it was known for its diamond-mining operations until the 2000s.

The Buffels River "flows" through Kleinzee, but most of the time it is just a dry river bed, and only flows with heavy rainfall, approximately once every several years. Bounded by semidesert on three sides and the Atlantic Ocean to the west, Kleinzee has a significant underground water table.

== History ==
It was originally the site of a freehold farm called Kleyne Zee. The name means 'small sea', referring to a lagoon at the mouth of the Buffels River. Jack Carstens was searching the coast (later Diamond Coast) for diamonds when he heard word of their discovery on the grounds of Kleyne Zee by locals de Villiers and Alberts in 1926. A crater was opened within a week. The farm was owned by the Kotze and Goosen families - the Kotzes farmed the land and the Goosens were fishermen on the lagoon (the "Kleyne Zee"). The families agreed to sell the land before being informed of the presence of diamonds. The Cape Coast Exploration Company bought it in 1927, which was then incorporated into De Beers the following year.

The Namaqualand Mines Division of De Beers established Kleinzee as a private alluvial diamond mining settlement. At its peak, it reportedly had a population of around 4 thousand. With access from the outside world restricted, Kleinzee was mostly inhabited by middle-class mine workers, managers, and their families. De Beers covered the residents' utility bills and invested in amenities such as pools, a golf course and sports fields, and hobby clubs.

The diamonds had begun to run out by the 2000s. The population of Kleinzee generally consisted of around 2 thousand residents, but considerably reduced after the down-scaling of mining activities in 2009.

== Economy ==
With sparse vegetation, Kleinzee relies more so on fishing than farming. One of the few local industries De Beers has continued to invest in is oyster farming on the dams left by the mines.

== Tourism ==
Both the nature and man made sites have drawn tourists to the village and its surrounding semidesert coastal area. Despite its reputation as a ghost town, the village, now more accessible to the public, has seen an uptick in tourism since De Beers' departure. Koos van der Merwe opened a resort in 2014, and a number of B&Bs and camping sites have since followed. It is on the Shipwreck Route and the Spektakel Daisies Pass.

=== Kleinzee Yacht Club ===
As part of De Beers' recreational investments, one of the cofferdams was converted into a 500 metre-long artificial lake for a yacht club with sailing and other water sports. Due to a lack of maintenance, it has a particularly high salt content, which gives the water a reddish-pink hue and enables people to float in it.

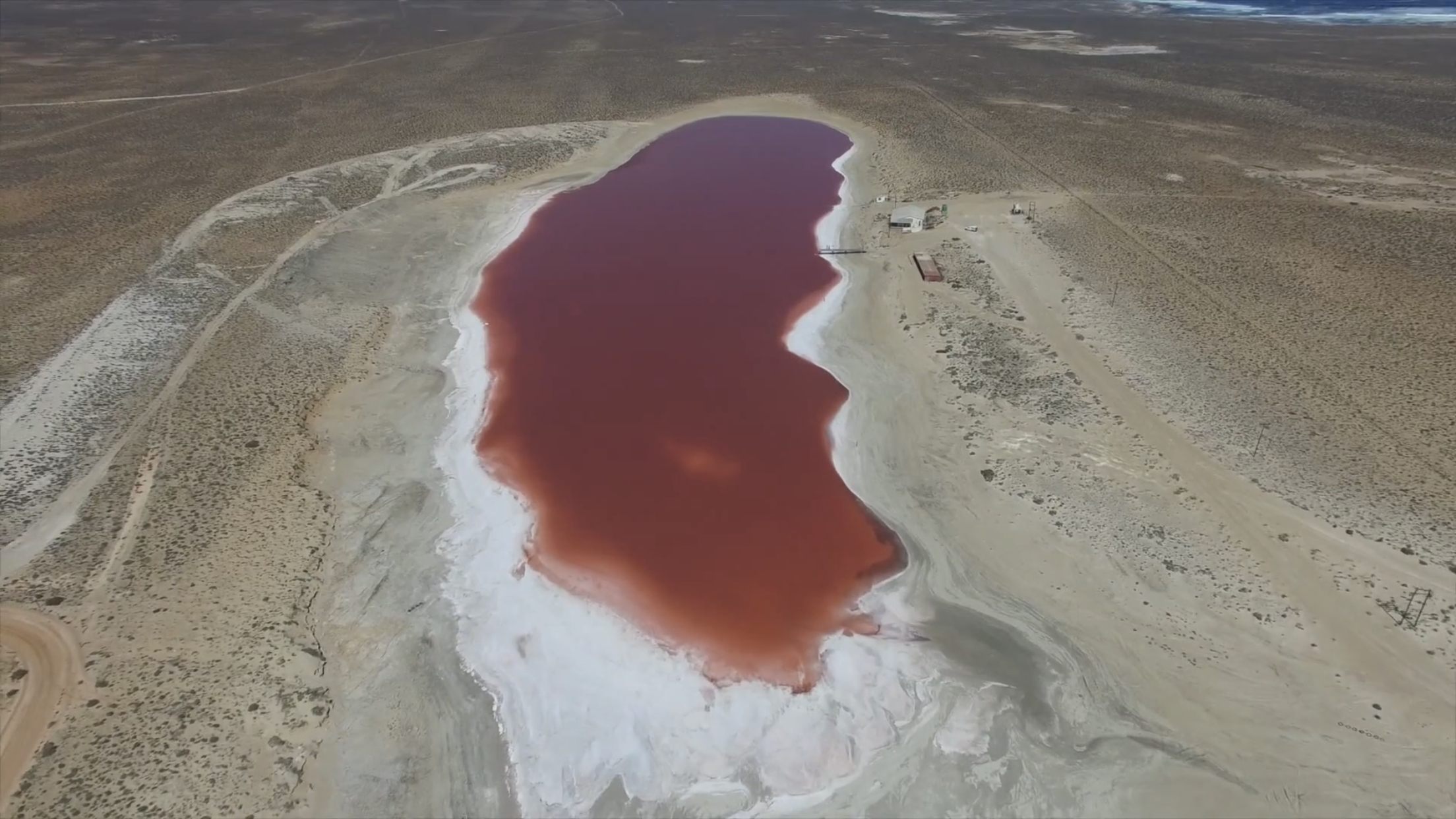

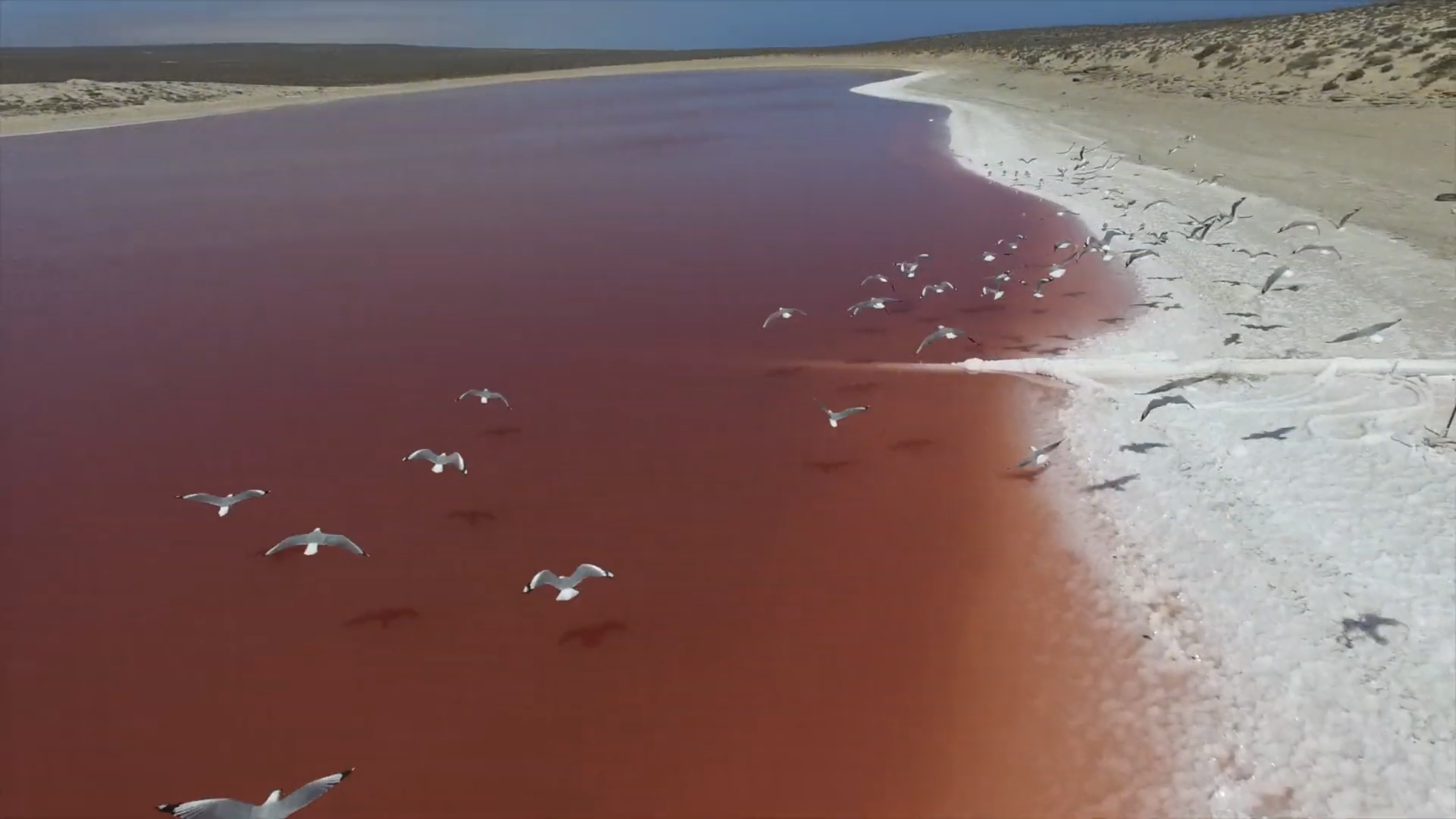

=== Boulder Heritage Route and Kleinzee Museum ===
Boulder Heritage Route is a historic trail through Kleinzee's old diamond mines. Kleinzee Museum also seeks to preserve the village's history.

== Education ==
Laerskool Kleinzee is a private school with an attendance of 111 students. The Primary School became a Centre for learning and Development.

== Transport ==
The village used to be serviced by the small Kleinzee Airport (KLZ). It is no longer in use and not open to the public.
