= List of U.S. county name etymologies (N–R) =

This is a list of U.S. county name etymologies, covering the letters N to R.

== N ==
| County name | State | Origin |
|---|---|---|
| Nacogdoches County | Texas | Named for the Nacogdoche tribe of Caddo Native Americans. |
| Nance County | Nebraska | Named after Governor Albinus Nance. |
| Town and County of Nantucket | Massachusetts | Nantucket takes its name from a word in an Eastern Algonquian language of southern New England, originally spelled variously as natocke, nantaticut, nantican, and nautican. The meaning of the term is uncertain, although it may have meant "in the midst of waters," or "far away island." |
| Napa County | California | Named for the city of Napa, California, which takes its name from a southern Nappan village. |
| Nash County | North Carolina | Named for Brigadier General Francis Nash, who had been mortally wounded at the Battle of Germantown. |
| Nassau County | Florida | Named for the Duchy of Nassau in Germany. |
| Nassau County | New York | Named after an old name for Long Island, which was named Nassau after William of Nassau, Prince of Orange (who later became King William III of England.) |
| Natchitoches Parish | Louisiana | Named for the Natchitoches tribe of Native Americans. |
| Natrona County | Wyoming | Named for the natron (soda) deposits in the county. |
| Navajo County | Arizona | named for the Navajo. |
| Navarro County | Texas | Named for José Antonio Navarro, a Tejano leader in the Texas Revolution who signed the Texas Declaration of Independence. |
| Nelson County | Kentucky | Named for Thomas Nelson, Jr. a Virginia Governor who signed the Declaration of Independence. |
| Nelson County | North Dakota | for Nelson E. Nelson, a ND legislator at the time. |
| Nelson County | Virginia | Named for Thomas Nelson, Jr. a Virginia Governor who signed the Declaration of Independence. |
| Nemaha County | Kansas | Chiwere word ñí-máha 'murky water.' |
| Nemaha County | Nebraska | Chiwere word ñí-máha 'murky water.' |
| Neosho County | Kansas | Neosho River, from the Osage meaning 'cold, clear water' or 'main river,' |
| Neshoba County | Mississippi | Nashoba, a Choctaw chief, derived from the Choctaw word nashoba, means Wolf. |
| Ness County | Kansas | Named for Corporal Noah V. Ness of the 7th Kansas Cavalry Regiment (US Army). Ness died of wounds suffered at the Battle of Abbeyville in Mississippi in August 1864. |
| Nevada County | Arkansas | The state of Nevada, which it resembles in shape. |
| Nevada County | California | named after the mining town of Nevada City, a name derived from the term "Sierra Nevada." The word nevada in Spanish means "snowy" or "snowcovered." |
| New Castle County | Delaware | William Cavendish, 1st Duke of Newcastle-upon-Tyne, courtier. |
| New Hanover County | North Carolina | Named for the House of Hanover. |
| New Haven County | Connecticut | Named after its largest city and county seat, New Haven. |
| New Kent County | Virginia | The county of Kent, England. |
| New London County | Connecticut | Named after the county seat, New London, which is named for London, England. |
| New Madrid County | Missouri | Named after a district located in the region that was once under Spanish rule, Nuevo Madrid, after the city of Madrid, Spain. |
| New York County | New York | New York is named after James, Duke of York, who renamed New Amsterdam after himself shortly after the British takeover in 1664. The county name also refers to the fact that New York City was wholly contained in the county until it combined with other areas in the 1880s. New York County today is thus simply referred to as Manhattan, the island that forms almost all the area of the county. |
| Newaygo County | Michigan | Derived from then name of a Chippewa chief who signed the Treaty of Saginaw or from a Algonquian word meaning "much water." |
| Newberry County | South Carolina | Unknown; possibly named for Newbury, Berkshire, England. |
| Newport County | Rhode Island | Descriptive, recalling Newport, Monmouthshire, Wales |
| City of Newport News | Virginia | Not known with any certainty. See the "Name" section of the city's article for possibilities. |
| Newton County | Arkansas | Named for Thomas W. Newton, an Arkansas Congressman. |
| Newton County | Georgia | Named after Sgt. John Newton of the American Revolutionary War. |
| Newton County | Indiana | Named after Sgt. John Newton of the American Revolutionary War. |
| Newton County | Mississippi | Named for Sir Isaac Newton, physicist. |
| Newton County | Missouri | Named after Sgt. John Newton of the American Revolutionary War. |
| Newton County | Texas | Named after Sgt. John Newton of the American Revolutionary War. |
| Nez Perce County | Idaho | Named for the Nez Percé tribe of Native Americans. |
| Niagara County | New York | Derived from the Indian word Onguiaahra meaning the straight or thunder of waters. |
| Nicholas County | Kentucky | Named for George Nicholas, the "Father of the Kentucky Constitution". |
| Nicholas County | West Virginia | Named for Virginia Governor Wilson Cary Nicholas. |
| Nicollet County | Minnesota | Named for Joseph Nicolas Nicollet, a geographer-explorer. |
| Niobrara County | Wyoming | Omaha–Ponca languageIndian 'spreading water river.' |
| Noble County | Indiana | Named for James Noble, the first U.S. Senator from Indiana. |
| Noble County | Ohio | Named for Rep. Warren P. Noble of the Ohio House of Representatives, who was an early settler there. |
| Noble County | Oklahoma | for John W. Noble, Secretary of the Interior |
| Nobles County | Minnesota | Named for William H. Nobles, a member of the Territorial Legislature. |
| Nodaway County | Missouri | Named for the Nodaway River, from the Chiwere Nyi At'ąwe, "jump over water." |
| Nolan County | Texas | Named for Philip Nolan, one of the first American traders to visit Texas. |
| Nome Census Area | Alaska | Named for Nome, Alaska. |
| City of Norfolk | Virginia | Named for the county of Norfolk, England. |
| Norfolk County | Massachusetts | Named for the county of Norfolk, England. |
| Norman County | Minnesota | In honor of the large number of Norwegians (endonym nordmenn), who settled in this county. |
| North Slope Borough | Alaska | Named for the Alaska North Slope, a region on the northern slope of the Brooks Range. |
| Northampton County | North Carolina | Named for James Compton, 5th Earl of Northampton. |
| Northampton County | Pennsylvania | Northamptonshire, England, |
| Northampton County | Virginia | for Spencer Compton, 2nd Earl of Northampton |
| Northumberland County | Pennsylvania | Named for the county of Northumberland, England. |
| Northumberland County | Virginia | Named for the county of Northumberland, England. |
| Northwest Arctic Borough | Alaska | Named for its location in the northwest Arctic region of Alaska. |
| City of Norton | Virginia | Named in 1890 after Eckstein Norton, then president of the Louisville & Nashville Railroad. |
| Norton County | Kansas | Named for Orloff Norton. |
| Nottoway County | Virginia | From the Nottoway people. |
| Nowata County | Oklahoma | From the Lenape word nuwita, meaning "friendly" or "welcome." |
| Noxubee County | Mississippi | Derived from the Choctaw word nakshobi, meaning to stink. |
| Nuckolls County | Nebraska | Named after Stephen F. Nuckolls, an early pioneer in this area. |
| Nueces County | Texas | Named for the Nueces River, whose name comes from the Spanish word for walnuts or pecans. |
| Nye County | Nevada | Named in honor of James W. Nye, first governor of the Nevada Territory and later U.S. Senator from the state. |

== O ==
| County name | State | Origin |
|---|---|---|
| O'Brien County | Iowa | For William Smith O'Brien, Irish leader |
| Oakland County | Michigan | Named for the numerous oak openings in the county. |
| Obion County | Tennessee | From the Obion River, named either from an Indian word meaning 'many forks' or from an Irish-French trapper named O'Brien. |
| Ocean County | New Jersey | Location on the Atlantic Ocean |
| Oceana County | Michigan | Named "Oceana" because it borders Lake Michigan, the freshwater "ocean." |
| Ochiltree County | Texas | For Col. William Beck Ochiltree, Republic of Texas secretary of the treasury. |
| Oconee County | Georgia | For the Oconee River, which is named after a Muskogean people. |
| Oconee County | South Carolina | For the Oconee River, which is named after a Muskogean people. |
| Oconto County | Wisconsin | For the Oconto River, said to mean "plenty of fish." |
| Ofu County | American Samoa | Named after Ofu island. |
| Ogemaw County | Michigan | From the Anishinaabemowin word ogimaa, meaning "chief". |
| Oglala Lakota County | South Dakota | For the Oglala Lakota people. |
| Ogle County | Illinois | For Lt. Joseph Ogle, first Methodist layman in Illinois and captain of the territorial militia. |
| Oglethorpe County | Georgia | For Gen. James Edward Oglethorpe, founder of Georgia and first governor |
| Ohio County | Indiana | Named for the Ohio River (Seneca Ohi:yo', "Good River"), which it borders. |
| Ohio County | Kentucky | Named for the Ohio River (Seneca Ohi:yo', "Good River"), which it used to border until Daviess County and Hancock County were carved out of it in 1829. |
| Ohio County | West Virginia | Named for the Ohio River (Seneca Ohi:yo', "Good River"), which it borders. |
| Okaloosa County | Florida | From Choctaw oka lusa, "black water." |
| Okanogan County | Washington | From the Syilx (Okanogan, ukʷnaqín) people. |
| Okfuskee County | Oklahoma | Named for the Okfuskee, a Muscogee people. |
| Oklahoma County | Oklahoma | From the Choctaw phrase okla humma, meaning "red people", invented by Allen Wright and applied to the Oklahoma Territory. |
| Okmulgee County | Oklahoma | From the Creek okimulgi meaning "boiling water." |
| Oktibbeha County | Mississippi | From Choctaw okti abeha, "ice therein." |
| Oldham County | Kentucky | Named in honor of Col. William Oldham of Jefferson County, a Revolutionary War officer. |
| Oldham County | Texas | named for William Simpson Oldham Sr., Texas pioneer and Confederate Senator. |
| Oliver County | North Dakota | Harry S. Oliver, Republican politician and member of the Dakota Territory House of Representatives |
| Olmsted County | Minnesota | David Olmsted, first mayor of St. Paul, Minnesota. |
| Olosega County | American Samoa | Named after Olosega island (Samoan ʻOlosega, "fortress of parakeets.") |
| Oneida County | Idaho | Named for Oneida Lake, from which most of the early settlers had migrated. |
| Oneida County | New York | Named for the Oneida people. |
| Oneida County | Wisconsin | Named for the Oneida people. |
| Onondaga County | New York | From the Onondaga (Onöñda’gaga’, "Hill Place") people |
| Onslow County | North Carolina | Named for Arthur Onslow, longtime Speaker of the House of Commons. |
| Ontario County | New York | Named for Lake Ontario (Huron Ontarí'io, "great lake.") |
| Ontonagon County | Michigan | Named for the Ontonagon River, from Ojibwe Nondon-organ ("hunting river") or Ontonagori ("lost bowl"). |
| Orange County | California | Named for the orange, so the county would sound like a semi-tropical, Mediterranean region to people from the east coast. |
| Orange County | Florida | Named for the orange, its main crop. |
| Orange County | Indiana | The first settlers were from Orange County, North Carolina. |
| Orange County | New York | Named for William, Prince of Orange, later King William III. |
| Orange County | North Carolina | Named for the ruling House of Orange-Nassau. |
| Orange County | Texas | Named for the orange, formerly its main crop. |
| Orange County | Vermont | Named for William, Prince of Orange, later King William III. |
| Orange County | Virginia | Named for William, Prince of Orange, later King William III. |
| Orangeburg County | South Carolina | Named for Orangeburg, South Carolina, which was named for William, Prince of Orange, later King William III. |
| Oregon County | Missouri | Named for the Oregon Territory. |
| Orleans County | New York | Uncertain; either to honor the Louis Philippe, Duc d'Orléans, or in reference to the 1815 Battle of New Orleans. |
| Orleans County | Vermont | Uncertain, believed to be named after Orléans, France. |
| Orleans County | Louisiana | Named for Philippe II, Duke of Orléans. |
| Osage County | Kansas | Named for the Osage Nation. |
| Osage County | Missouri | Named for the Osage River. |
| Osage County | Oklahoma | Named for the Osage Nation. |
| Osborne County | Kansas | Named for Captain Vincent B. Osborne, a Civil War soldier in the 2nd Kansas Volunteer Infantry Regiment on the Union side. |
| Osceola County | Florida | Named for the Seminole chief Osceola. |
| Osceola County | Iowa | Named for the Seminole chief Osceola. |
| Osceola County | Michigan | Named for the Seminole chief Osceola. |
| Oscoda County | Michigan | Believed to be a combination of two Ojibwa words, ossin (stone) and muskoda (prairie). |
| Oswego County | New York | Named for the Oswego River, from Mohawk for "small water flowing into that which is large." |
| Otero County | Colorado | Named for Miguel Antonio Otero, a prominent politician from the New Mexico Territory. |
| Otero County | New Mexico | Named for Miguel Antonio Otero, a prominent politician from the New Mexico Territory. |
| Otoe County | Nebraska | Named for the Otoe people. |
| Otsego County | Michigan | Derived from the Mohawk word that meant either "clear water" or "meeting place." |
| Otsego County | New York | Named for Otsego Lake, from a Mohawk or Oneida word meaning "place of the rock", referring to the large boulder near the lake's outlet, today known as "Council Rock". |
| Ottawa County | Kansas | Named for the native Odawa people. |
| Ottawa County | Michigan | Named for the native Odawa people. |
| Ottawa County | Ohio | Named for the native Odawa people. |
| Ottawa County | Oklahoma | Named for the native Odawa people. |
| Otter Tail County | Minnesota | Named for the Otter Tail River. |
| Ouachita County | Arkansas | Named for the Ouachita River, named in turn for the Ouachita people, from the French transliteration of the Caddo word washita, meaning "good hunting ground." |
| Ouachita County | Louisiana | Named for the Ouachita River, named in turn for the Ouachita people, from the French transliteration of the Caddo word washita, meaning "good hunting ground." |
| Ouray County | Colorado | Named for Chief Ouray, leader of the Uncompahgre Ute tribe and a noted statesman. |
| Outagamie County | Wisconsin | A French transliteration of Utagami, the Ojibwe term for the Meskwaki (Fox) Indians, meaning "dwellers on the other side of the stream," referring to their historic habitation along the St. Lawrence River |
| Overton County | Tennessee | Named for John Overton, judge, planter, politician and banker. |
| Owen County | Indiana | Named for Abraham Owen, soldier, surveyor and politician. |
| Owen County | Kentucky | Named for Abraham Owen, soldier, surveyor and politician. |
| Owsley County | Kentucky | Named for William Owsley, 16th Governor of Kentucky. |
| Owyhee County | Idaho | Named for some Native Hawaiian ("Owyhee") trappers who disappeared in the winter of 1819–20. |
| Oxford County | Maine | Possibly named for Oxford, Massachusetts. |
| Ozark County | Missouri | Named for the Ozarks (from the French abbreviation aux Arcs, aux Arkansas, "of/at Arkansas"). |
| Ozaukee County | Wisconsin | From Ozaagii, the Ojibwe name for the Sauk people. |

== P ==
| County name | State | Origin |
|---|---|---|
| Pacific County | Washington | Named for the Pacific Ocean. |
| Page County | Iowa | Named for Captain John Page, soldier killed in the Mexican–American War. |
| Page County | Virginia | Named for John Page, a governor of Virginia. |
| Palm Beach County | Florida | Named for Palm Beach, Florida, named for its palm trees. |
| Palo Alto County | Iowa | Named for the Battle of Palo Alto. |
| Palo Pinto County | Texas | Named for the Palo Pinto Creek (Spanish palo pinto, "painted stick"). |
| Pamlico County | North Carolina | Named for the Pamlico people. |
| Panola County | Mississippi | From panolo, Choctaw and Chickasaw word for cotton. |
| Panola County | Texas | From panolo, Choctaw and Chickasaw word for cotton. |
| Park County | Colorado | Named for the South Park region. |
| Park County | Montana | Named for its proximity to Yellowstone National Park. |
| Park County | Wyoming | Named for its proximity to Yellowstone National Park. |
| Parke County | Indiana | Named for Benjamin Parke, political figure. |
| Parker County | Texas | Named for Isaac Parker, a Texas state representative. |
| Parmer County | Texas | Named for Martin Parmer, signatory to the Texas Declaration of Independence. |
| Pasco County | Florida | Named for Samuel Pasco, a United States senator. |
| Pasquotank County | North Carolina | Pasquotank River, from Algonquian pashetanki, "where the current forks." |
| Passaic County | New Jersey | Pasaeck, a Lenape word for "valley." |
| Patrick County | Virginia | Named for Founding Father Patrick Henry. |
| Paulding County | Georgia | Named for Revolutionary War fighter John Paulding. |
| Paulding County | Ohio | Named for Revolutionary War fighter John Paulding. |
| Pawnee County | Kansas | Named for the Pawnee people. |
| Pawnee County | Nebraska | Named for the Pawnee people. |
| Pawnee County | Oklahoma | Named for the Pawnee people. |
| Payette County | Idaho | Named for Francois Payette, fur trader. |
| Payne County | Oklahoma | Named for David L. Payne, soldier and pioneer. |
| Peach County | Georgia | Named for the peach, a major crop. |
| Pearl River County | Mississippi | Named for the Pearl River. |
| Pecos County | Texas | Named for the Pecos River, from the Keresan term for the Pecos Pueblo. |
| Pembina County | North Dakota | From a Chippewa term for "stabbing." |
| Pemiscot County | Missouri | Named for the local bayou, taken from the Fox word, pem-eskaw, meaning "liquid mud." |
| Pend Oreille County | Washington | Named for the Pend d'Oreilles (French "hangs from ear") people, so called because of their shell earrings. |
| Pender County | North Carolina | Named for William Dorsey Pender, Confederate general. |
| Pendleton County | Kentucky | Named for Edmund Pendleton, planter and politician. |
| Pendleton County | West Virginia | Named for Edmund Pendleton, planter and politician. |
| Pennington County | Minnesota | Named for Edmund Pennington, President of the Minneapolis, St. Paul and Sault Ste. Marie Railroad. |
| Pennington County | South Dakota | Named for John L. Pennington, fifth Governor of Dakota Territory. |
| Penobscot County | Maine | Named for the Penobscot people. |
| Peoria County | Illinois | Named for the Peoria people. |
| Pepin County | Wisconsin | Named for Lake Pepin, named in turn after explorers Pierre and Jean Pepin du Chardonnets. |
| Perkins County | Nebraska | Named for Charles Elliott Perkins, president of the Chicago, Burlington and Quincy Railroad. |
| Perkins County | South Dakota | Named for Sturgis, South Dakota official Henry E. Perkins. |
| Perquimans County | North Carolina | Named for the Perquimans (Perkiomen, Perkimen), an Algonquian people. |
| Perry County | Alabama | Named for naval officer Oliver Hazard Perry. |
| Perry County | Arkansas | Named for naval officer Oliver Hazard Perry. |
| Perry County | Illinois | Named for naval officer Oliver Hazard Perry. |
| Perry County | Indiana | Named for naval officer Oliver Hazard Perry. |
| Perry County | Kentucky | Named for naval officer Oliver Hazard Perry. |
| Perry County | Mississippi | Named for naval officer Oliver Hazard Perry. |
| Perry County | Missouri | Named for naval officer Oliver Hazard Perry. |
| Perry County | Ohio | Named for naval officer Oliver Hazard Perry. |
| Perry County | Pennsylvania | Named for naval officer Oliver Hazard Perry. |
| Perry County | Tennessee | Named for naval officer Oliver Hazard Perry. |
| Pershing County | Nevada | Named for General John J. Pershing. |
| Person County | North Carolina | Named for Revolutionary War fighter Thomas Person. |
| Petersburg Borough | Alaska | Named for Petersburg, Alaska, named for Saint Petersburg, Russia. |
| City of Petersburg | Virginia | Named for 17th-century soldier Peter Jones, who commanded a fort near the city's current location and opened a trading post known as Peter's Point where the city was eventually founded. |
| Petroleum County | Montana | Named for its petroleum fields; it was the first place in Montana where petroleum was discovered. |
| Pettis County | Missouri | Named for Spencer Darwin Pettis, politician; died in a famous duel. |
| Phelps County | Missouri | Named for John S. Phelps, Civil War general (U.S. Army) and 23rd Governor of Missouri. |
| Phelps County | Nebraska | Named for William Phelps, an early settler. |
| Philadelphia County | Pennsylvania | Named for Philadelphia, named by the city's founder William Penn from the Greek Φιλαδέλφεια, meaning "brotherly love" (from philos, "love", and adelphos, "brother"). |
| Phillips County | Arkansas | Sylvanus Phillips, area's first known white settler and representative to the first legislature of the Arkansas Territory. |
| Phillips County | Colorado | R. O. Phillips, a secretary of the Lincoln Land Company. |
| Phillips County | Kansas | Named for William A. Phillips, journalist, soldier and politician. |
| Phillips County | Montana | Named for Benjamin D. Phillips, rancher and state senator. |
| Piatt County | Illinois | Named for James A. Piatt, an early settler. |
| Pickaway County | Ohio | Named for the Pekowi band of the Shawnee. |
| Pickens County | Alabama | Named for Andrew Pickens, militia leader in the Revolutionary War. |
| Pickens County | Georgia | Named for Andrew Pickens, militia leader in the Revolutionary War. |
| Pickens County | South Carolina | Named for Andrew Pickens, militia leader in the Revolutionary War. |
| Pickett County | Tennessee | Named for Howard L. Pickett, state legislator. |
| Pierce County | Georgia | Named for Franklin Pierce, U.S. President 1853–1857. |
| Pierce County | Nebraska | Named for Franklin Pierce, U.S. President 1853–1857. |
| Pierce County | North Dakota | Named for Gilbert A. Pierce, author, journalist, playwright and politician. |
| Pierce County | Washington | Named for Franklin Pierce, U.S. President 1853–1857. |
| Pierce County | Wisconsin | Named for Franklin Pierce, U.S. President 1853–1857. |
| Pike County | Alabama | Named for soldier and explorer Zebulon Pike. |
| Pike County | Arkansas | Named for soldier and explorer Zebulon Pike. |
| Pike County | Georgia | Named for soldier and explorer Zebulon Pike. |
| Pike County | Illinois | Named for soldier and explorer Zebulon Pike. |
| Pike County | Indiana | Named for soldier and explorer Zebulon Pike. |
| Pike County | Kentucky | Named for soldier and explorer Zebulon Pike. |
| Pike County | Mississippi | Named for soldier and explorer Zebulon Pike. |
| Pike County | Missouri | Named for soldier and explorer Zebulon Pike. |
| Pike County | Ohio | Named for soldier and explorer Zebulon Pike. |
| Pike County | Pennsylvania | Named for soldier and explorer Zebulon Pike. |
| Pima County | Arizona | Named for the Pima people. |
| Pinal County | Arizona | Named for the Pinal Mountains, named for their pine trees. |
| Pine County | Minnesota | Named for its pine trees. |
| Pinellas County | Florida | From Spanish Punta Piñal, "point of pines." |
| Pipestone County | Minnesota | Named for the presence of pipestone (catlinite) in its rocks. |
| Piscataquis County | Maine | The Piscataquis River, from an Abenaki word meaning "branch of the river." |
| Pitkin County | Colorado | Named for Frederick Walker Pitkin, who was Governor of Colorado at the time of the county's formation. |
| Pitt County | North Carolina | Named for William Pitt the Elder, then Secretary of State for the Southern Department and Leader of the House of Commons, later Prime Minister of Great Britain. |
| Pittsburg County | Oklahoma | Named because its coal production rivaled Pittsburgh, Pennsylvania. |
| Pittsylvania County | Virginia | Named for William Pitt the Elder, then Prime Minister of Great Britain. |
| Piute County | Utah | Named for the Southern Paiute people. |
| Placer County | California | Named for the practice of placer mining. |
| Plaquemines County | Louisiana | From a Louisiana French word for the persimmon, derived from the Atakapa piakimin. |
| Platte County | Missouri | Named for the Platte River (probably from the French plate, "flat"), or the Platte Purchase. |
| Platte County | Nebraska | Named for the Platte River (probably from the French plate, "flat"). |
| Platte County | Wyoming | Named for the North Platte River. |
| Pleasants County | West Virginia | Named for James Pleasants, 22nd Governor of Virginia. |
| Plumas County | California | From the Spanish name of the Feather River (Río de las Plumas). |
| Plymouth County | Iowa | Named for the town of Plymouth, Massachusetts, named in turn for Plymouth, England, from where the Mayflower sailed to America. |
| Plymouth County | Massachusetts | Named for the town of Plymouth, Massachusetts, named in turn for Plymouth, England, from where the Mayflower sailed to America. |
| Pocahontas County | Iowa | Named for the Powhatan princess Pocahontas. |
| Pocahontas County | West Virginia | Named for the Powhatan princess Pocahontas. |
| Poinsett County | Arkansas | Named for Joel Roberts Poinsett, physician, diplomat and Secretary of War. |
| Pointe Coupee Parish | Louisiana | From French Pointe-Coupée, "point of the cutoff." |
| Polk County | Arkansas | Named for James K. Polk, President of the United States 1845–49. |
| Polk County | Florida | Named for James K. Polk, President of the United States 1845–49. |
| Polk County | Georgia | Named for James K. Polk, President of the United States 1845–49. |
| Polk County | Iowa | Named for James K. Polk, President of the United States 1845–49. |
| Polk County | Minnesota | Named for James K. Polk, President of the United States 1845–49. |
| Polk County | Missouri | Named for James K. Polk, President of the United States 1845–49. |
| Polk County | Nebraska | Named for James K. Polk, President of the United States 1845–49. |
| Polk County | North Carolina | Named for William Polk, a colonel in the American Revolution and a member of that state's House of Commons. |
| Polk County | Oregon | Named for James K. Polk, President of the United States 1845–49. |
| Polk County | Tennessee | Named for James K. Polk before he became President; he was governor of Tennessee at the time the county was established. |
| Polk County | Texas | Named for James K. Polk, President of the United States 1845–49. |
| Polk County | Wisconsin | Named for James K. Polk, President of the United States 1845–49. |
| Pondera County | Montana | Named for the Pend d'Oreilles people, whose name is French for "ear pendant." |
| Pontotoc County | Mississippi | From a Chickasaw word for the region meaning either "cattail prairie" or"land of hanging grapes." |
| Pontotoc County | Oklahoma | From a Chickasaw word for the region meaning either "cattail prairie" or"land of hanging grapes." |
| Pope County | Arkansas | Named for John Pope, 3rd Governor of Arkansas Territory. |
| Pope County | Illinois | Named for Nathaniel Pope, Secretary of the Illinois Territory. |
| Pope County | Minnesota | Named for John Pope, Union general in the Civil War. |
| City of Poquoson | Virginia | From pocosin, an Algonquian word meaning "a low, marshy, woody place covered by water in the winter, but dry in the summer." |
| Portage County | Ohio | Named for the portage between the Cuyahoga and Tuscarawas Rivers |
| Portage County | Wisconsin | Named for the portage between the Fox and Wisconsin Rivers |
| Porter County | Indiana | Named for David Porter, a notable Commodore for the Americans during the War of 1812. |
| City of Portsmouth | Virginia | Named for Portsmouth, England. |
| Posey County | Indiana | Named for Thomas Posey, a governor of Indiana Territory. |
| Pottawatomie County | Kansas | Named for the Potawatomi people. |
| Pottawatomie County | Oklahoma | Named for the Potawatomi people. |
| Pottawattamie County | Iowa | Named for the Potawatomi people. |
| Potter County | Pennsylvania | Named for James Potter, 4th Vice-President of Pennsylvania. |
| Potter County | South Dakota | Named for Joel A. Potter, territorial legislator. |
| Potter County | Texas | Named for Robert Potter, signer of the Texas Declaration of Independence and Texas Secretary of the Navy. |
| Powder River County | Montana | Named for the Powder River. |
| Powell County | Kentucky | Named for Lazarus W. Powell, 19th Governor of Kentucky. |
| Powell County | Montana | Named for Mount Powell, which was named in turn for John Wesley Powell. |
| Power County | Idaho | Named for the power plant at American Falls Dam. |
| Poweshiek County | Iowa | Named for Poweshiek, a Meskwaki chief. |
| Powhatan County | Virginia | Named for the Powhatan people. |
| Prairie County | Arkansas | Named for the Grand Prairie. |
| Prairie County | Montana | Named for its prairie landscape. |
| Pratt County | Kansas | Named for Caleb S. Pratt, U.S. Army soldier in the Bleeding Kansas conflict. |
| Preble County | Ohio | Named for Edward Preble, naval officer. |
| Prentiss County | Mississippi | Named for Seargent Smith Prentiss, orator and politician. |
| Presidio County | Texas | Named for Presidio del Norte ("Presidio of the North"), a border settlement established around 1760. |
| Presque Isle County | Michigan | Derived from a French term for "peninsula," literally "nearly an island." |
| Preston County | West Virginia | Named for James Patton Preston, 20th Governor of Virginia. |
| Price County | Wisconsin | Named for William T. Price, politician. |
| Prince Edward County | Virginia | Named for Prince Edward, Duke of York and Albany, son of Frederick, Prince of Wales, who was son of King George II. |
| Prince George County | Virginia | Named for Prince George of Denmark, husband of Queen Anne. |
| Prince George's County | Maryland | Named for Prince George of Denmark, husband of Queen Anne. |
| Prince William County | Virginia | Named for Prince William, Duke of Cumberland, son of King George II. |
| Prince of Wales–Hyder Census Area | Alaska | Named for Prince of Wales Island and Hyder, Alaska, named in turn after George, Prince of Wales (later George IV) and mining engineer Frederick Hyder respectively. |
| Providence County | Rhode Island | Named for Providence Plantations, named in turn for Divine Providence. |
| Prowers County | Colorado | Named for pioneer John W. Prowers. |
| Pueblo County | Colorado | Pueblo County is named for El Pueblo, an adobe trading post located at the confluence of the Arkansas River and Fountain Creek. |
| Pulaski County | Arkansas | Named for Casimir Pulaski (Kazimierz Pułaski), Polish count who fought in the Revolutionary War. |
| Pulaski County | Georgia | Named for Casimir Pulaski (Kazimierz Pułaski), Polish count who fought in the Revolutionary War. |
| Pulaski County | Illinois | Named for Casimir Pulaski (Kazimierz Pułaski), Polish count who fought in the Revolutionary War. |
| Pulaski County | Indiana | Named for Casimir Pulaski (Kazimierz Pułaski), Polish count who fought in the Revolutionary War. |
| Pulaski County | Kentucky | Named for Casimir Pulaski (Kazimierz Pułaski), Polish count who fought in the Revolutionary War. |
| Pulaski County | Missouri | Named for Casimir Pulaski (Kazimierz Pułaski), Polish count who fought in the Revolutionary War. |
| Pulaski County | Virginia | Named for Casimir Pulaski (Kazimierz Pułaski), Polish count who fought in the Revolutionary War. |
| Pushmataha County | Oklahoma | Named for Casimir Pulaski (Kazimierz Pułaski), Polish count who fought in the Revolutionary War. |
| Putnam County | Florida | Named for Benjamin A. Putnam, soldier and politician. |
| Putnam County | Georgia | Named for Revolutionary War general Israel Putnam. |
| Putnam County | Illinois | Named for Revolutionary War general Israel Putnam. |
| Putnam County | Indiana | Named for Revolutionary War general Israel Putnam. |
| Putnam County | Missouri | Named for Revolutionary War general Israel Putnam. |
| Putnam County | New York | Named for Revolutionary War general Israel Putnam. |
| Putnam County | Ohio | Named for Revolutionary War general Israel Putnam. |
| Putnam County | Tennessee | Named for Revolutionary War general Israel Putnam. |
| Putnam County | West Virginia | Named for Revolutionary War general Israel Putnam. |

== Q ==
| County name | State | Origin |
|---|---|---|
| Quay County | New Mexico | Named for Pennsylvania senator Matthew Quay, who supported New Mexican statehood. |
| Queen Anne's County | Maryland | Named for Anne, Queen of Great Britain, who reigned when the county was established in 1706. |
| Queens County | New York | Named for the then-queen consort, Catherine of Braganza, the Catholic wife of Charles II. |
| Quitman County | Georgia | Named after General John A. Quitman, leader in the Mexican War, and two-time Governor of Mississippi. |
| Quitman County | Mississippi | Named after General John A. Quitman, leader in the Mexican War, and two-time Governor of Mississippi. |

== R ==
| County name | State | Origin |
|---|---|---|
| Rabun County | Georgia | Named for William Rabun, 29th Governor of Georgia. |
| Racine County | Wisconsin | Named for the city of Racine, Wisconsin, itself named after the Root River, racine being French for "root." |
| City of Radford | Virginia | Named for Dr. John B. Radford, early inhabitant. |
| Rains County | Texas | Named for Emory Rains, politician in the Republic of Texas. |
| Raleigh County | West Virginia | Named for Walter Raleigh, English writer, soldier, politician, spy and explorer. |
| Ralls County | Missouri | Named for Daniel Ralls, Missouri state legislator. |
| Ramsey County | Minnesota | Named for Alexander Ramsey, first territorial governor of Minnesota and second governor after statehood, and United States Secretary of War 1879–81. |
| Ramsey County | North Dakota | Named for Alexander Ramsey, first territorial governor of Minnesota and second governor after statehood, and United States Secretary of War 1879–81. |
| Randall County | Texas | Named for Horace Randal (sic), Confederate soldier. |
| Randolph County | Alabama | Named for John Randolph of Roanoke, planter and politician. |
| Randolph County | Arkansas | Named for John Randolph of Roanoke, planter and politician. |
| Randolph County | Georgia | Named for John Randolph of Roanoke, planter and politician. |
| Randolph County | Illinois | Named for Edmund Randolph, first Attorney General of the United States. |
| Randolph County | Indiana | Named for Randolph County, North Carolina. |
| Randolph County | Missouri | Named for John Randolph of Roanoke, planter and politician. |
| Randolph County | North Carolina | Named for Peyton Randolph, first President of the Continental Congress. |
| Randolph County | West Virginia | Named for Edmund Randolph, seventh Governor of Virginia and first U.S. Attorney General. |
| Rankin County | Mississippi | Named for Christopher Rankin, politician. |
| Ransom County | North Dakota | Named for Fort Ransom, named in turn for Thomas E.G. Ransom. |
| Rapides Parish | Louisiana | Named for the rapids (French rapides) on the Red River of the South. |
| Rappahannock County | Virginia | Named for the Rappahannock River, from the Algonquian lappihanne, meaning "river of quick, rising water" or "where the tide ebbs and flows." |
| Ravalli County | Montana | Named for Antonio Ravalli, Italian Jesuit missionary. |
| Rawlins County | Kansas | Named for John Aaron Rawlins, Civil War Union general and Secretary of War in 1869. |
| Ray County | Missouri | Named for John Ray, Missouri state legislator. |
| Reagan County | Texas | Named for John Henninger Reagan, Confederate cabinet member. |
| Real County | Texas | Named for Julius Real, member of the Texas State Senate. |
| Red Lake County | Minnesota | Named for the Red Lake River. |
| Red River County | Texas | Named for the Red River of the South. |
| Red River Parish | Louisiana | Named for the Red River of the South. |
| Red Willow County | Nebraska | Named for the Red Willow Creek, a mistranslation of the Dakota name Chanshasha Wakpala, "Red Dogwood Creek." |
| Redwood County | Minnesota | Named for the Redwood River, named for the dogwoods with reddish bark. |
| Reeves County | Texas | Named for George R. Reeves, Speaker of the House of the State of Texas and Confederate colonel. |
| Refugio County | Texas | Named for the city of Refugio, Texas, itself named for the Rancho Nuestra Señora del Refugio. |
| Reno County | Kansas | Named for Jesse L. Reno, soldier. |
| Rensselaer County | New York | Named for Kiliaen van Rensselaer, Dutch merchant and founder of New Netherland. |
| Renville County | Minnesota | Named for Joseph Renville, interpreter, translator and soldier. |
| Renville County | North Dakota | Named for Joseph Renville, interpreter, translator and soldier. |
| Republic County | Kansas | Named for the Republican River, which was named after a band of Pawnee nicknamed "the republicans." |
| Reynolds County | Missouri | Named for Thomas Reynolds, 7th Governor of Missouri. |
| Rhea County | Tennessee | Named for John Rhea, Irish-American Revolutionary War soldier and Congressman. |
| Rice County | Kansas | Named for Samuel Allen Rice, Civil War colonel. |
| Rice County | Minnesota | Named for Henry Mower Rice, fur trader and politician. |
| Rich County | Utah | Named for Charles C. Rich, early Latter Day Saints leader, one of the Council of Fifty and a member of the Quorum of the Twelve Apostles 1849–83. |
| Richardson County | Nebraska | Named for William Alexander Richardson, 5th Governor of Nebraska Territory. |
| Richland County | Illinois | Named for Richland County, Ohio, where many of the county's influential settlers came from. |
| Richland County | Montana | Named for the richness of its soil, in order to attract settlers. |
| Richland County | North Dakota | Named for Morgan T. Rich, early settler. |
| Richland County | Ohio | Named for the richness of its soil. |
| Richland County | South Carolina | Named for the richness of its soil. |
| Richland County | Wisconsin | Named for the richness of its soil. |
| Richland Parish | Louisiana | Named for the richness of its soil. |
| City of Richmond | Virginia | Named for Richmond, Surrey, England, because the view of the James River was supposedly similar to the view of the River Thames from Richmond Hill. |
| Richmond County | Georgia | Named for Charles Lennox, 3rd Duke of Richmond, British politician; Secretary of State for the Southern Department and a supporter of the colonists during the Revolutionary War. |
| Richmond County | New York | Named for Charles Lennox, 1st Duke of Richmond, illegitimate son of King Charles II. |
| Richmond County | North Carolina | Named for Charles Lennox, 3rd Duke of Richmond, British politician; Secretary of State for the Southern Department and a supporter of the colonists during the Revolutionary War. |
| Richmond County | Virginia | Named for Charles Lennox, 1st Duke of Richmond, illegitimate son of King Charles II. |
| Riley County | Kansas | Named for Bennet C. Riley, 7th Military Governor of California. |
| Ringgold County | Iowa | Named for Samuel Ringgold, artillery officer. |
| Rio Arriba County | New Mexico | Named for its location on the upper Rio Grande (río arriba means "upriver" in Spanish) |
| Rio Blanco County | Colorado | Named for the White River (known in Spanish as the Río Blanco), which runs through the county. |
| Rio Grande County | Colorado | Named for the Rio Grande, which runs through the county. |
| Ripley County | Indiana | Named for Eleazer Wheelock Ripley, an officer of the War of 1812. |
| Ripley County | Missouri | Named for Eleazer Wheelock Ripley, an officer of the War of 1812. |
| Ritchie County | West Virginia | Named for writer and publisher Thomas Ritchie. |
| Riverside County | California | Named for Riverside, California, the county seat, which in turn was named for its location beside the Santa Ana River. |
| Roane County | Tennessee | Named for Archibald Roane, second Governor of Tennessee. |
| Roane County | West Virginia | Named for Spencer Roane, politician and judge. |
| City of Roanoke | Virginia | Named for Roanoke County, Virginia. |
| Roanoke County | Virginia | Named for the Roanoke River, named from rawrenok, an Algonquian word for wampum. |
| Roberts County | South Dakota | Named for S. G. Roberts, fur trader. |
| Roberts County | Texas | Named for Oran Milo Roberts, 17th Governor of Texas. |
| Robertson County | Kentucky | Named for George Robertson, judge and politician. |
| Robertson County | Tennessee | Named for James Robertson, explorer, soldier and Indian agent. |
| Robertson County | Texas | Named for Sterling C. Robertson, empresario during Mexican Texas. |
| Robeson County | North Carolina | Named for Thomas Robeson, Revolutionary War soldier. |
| Rock County | Minnesota | Named for the Rock River. |
| Rock County | Nebraska | Named for Rock Creek, which flows in the county; or the rocky condition of the soil in the area. |
| Rock County | Wisconsin | Named for the Rock River. |
| Rock Island County | Illinois | Named for Rock Island (now Arsenal Island) in the Mississippi River. |
| Rockbridge County | Virginia | Named for the Natural Bridge. |
| Rockcastle County | Kentucky | Named for the Rockcastle River. |
| Rockdale County | Georgia | Named for Rockdale Baptist Church in Conyers, Georgia. |
| Rockingham County | New Hampshire | Named for Charles Watson-Wentworth, 2nd Marquess of Rockingham, Prime Minister of Great Britain 1765–66 (and 1782). |
| Rockingham County | North Carolina | Named for Charles Watson-Wentworth, 2nd Marquess of Rockingham, Prime Minister of Great Britain 1765–66 (and 1782). |
| Rockingham County | Virginia | Named for Charles Watson-Wentworth, 2nd Marquess of Rockingham, Prime Minister of Great Britain 1765–66 (and 1782). |
| Rockland County | New York | Named for its rocky land. |
| Rockwall County | Texas | Named for Rockwall, Texas, which was named after rock walls thought to be man-made but later found to be natural clastic dikes. |
| Roger Mills County | Oklahoma | Named for Roger Q. Mills, Confederate officer and Texas politician. |
| Rogers County | Oklahoma | Named for Clement Vann Rogers, Cherokee settler and rancher. |
| Rolette County | North Dakota | Named for Joseph Rolette, fur trader and politician. |
| Rooks County | Kansas | Named for John C. Rooks, soldier in the U.S. Army during the Civil War. |
| Roosevelt County | Montana | Named for Theodore Roosevelt, President of the United States 1901–1909. |
| Roosevelt County | New Mexico | Named for Theodore Roosevelt, President of the United States 1901–1909. |
| Roscommon County | Michigan | Named for County Roscommon, Ireland; itself named for Roscommon (Irish Ros Comáin, "Coman's wooded height.") |
| Roseau County | Minnesota | Named for Roseau Lake and Roseau River (from the French roseau, "reed", a translation of the Ojibwe Ga-shashagunushkokawi-sibi, "place of rushes river"). |
| Rosebud County | Montana | Named for the Rosebud River, a tributary of the Stillwater River, named for its wild roses. |
| Ross County | Ohio | Named for James Ross, Pennsylvania Senator. |
| Routt County | Colorado | Named for John Long Routt, the last Territorial and first State Governor of Colorado. |
| Rowan County | Kentucky | Named for John Rowan, politician. |
| Rowan County | North Carolina | Named for Matthew Rowan, acting governor of North Carolina 1753–54. |
| Runnels County | Texas | Named for Hiram Runnels, Mississippi politician. |
| Rush County | Indiana | Named for Founding Father Benjamin Rush. |
| Rush County | Kansas | Named for Alexander Rush, Union Army captain and Civil War hero. |
| Rusk County | Texas | Named for Thomas Jefferson Rusk, political and military leader of the Republic of Texas. |
| Rusk County | Wisconsin | Named for Jeremiah McLain Rusk, 15th Governor of Wisconsin. |
| Russell County | Alabama | Named for Gilbert C. Russell, soldier. |
| Russell County | Kansas | Named for Avra P. Russell, Union captain and Civil War hero. |
| Russell County | Kentucky | Named for William Russell, soldier, pioneer, and politician. |
| Russell County | Virginia | Named for William Russell, Revolutionary War soldier and settler. |
| Rutherford County | North Carolina | Named for Griffith Rutherford, Revolutionary War soldier. |
| Rutherford County | Tennessee | Named for Griffith Rutherford, Revolutionary War soldier. |
| Rutland County | Vermont | Named for Rutland, Massachusetts, named in turn for the county of Rutland, England. |

== See also ==
- Lists of U.S. county name etymologies for links to the remainder of the list.
