= Ofu =

Ofu or OFU may refer to

- Ofu-Olosega, an island in the Manu'a group in American Samoa
  - Ofu Airport (IATA code OFU), a public airport on the island
- Ofu County, American Samoa
- Ofu, Nigeria, a town and Local Government Area in Kogi State
