= Nuʻutele Island =

Island of American Samoa

Coordinates: 14°10′01″S 169°41′05″W

Nu’utele Island is an uninhabited island located off the western shore of Ofu Island, in Ofu County, District of Manu’a, in American Sāmoa. The island is also known as Nu’utele Islet. It was formerly known as Lenu’u or “the village or place persons belong to” in 19th century accounts. It is an eroded tuff cone of the Ofu-Olosega volcano.

The island is owned by the Sia family in the village of Ofu. The island is sporadically visited by the family to fish near the shore and gather coconuts. It is occasionally visited by communal elders.

Nu’utele Island serves as a tourist destination accessible by boat or by swimming. However, there is a strong current between Nu’utele and Ofu islands, which makes snorkeling and swimming off Alafau or Ofu villages risky.

== Geography ==
Nu’utele Island features steep cliffs rising approximately 250 feet from the ridgeline to the shoreline. The ridgeline spans the entire length of the island, with the most treacherous cliffs located on the western side, while the eastern side exhibits more gradual slopes. The island experiences mean annual rainfall ranging from 381 to 635 centimeters and average temperatures between 75 and 80 degrees Fahrenheit.

Nu’utele Island is located 189 meters off the coast of Ofu Island.

=== Geology ===
The geological composition of Nu’utele Island is primarily defined by the Nu’u Formation, which originated during the Pleistocene Epoch, spanning from approximately 2.58 million years ago to 11,700 years before present. The island's geology predominantly consists of palagonitized lapilli tuff. A series of normal faults is present in the southern region of the island, while near its center, the geological strata exhibit a dip and strike of 28 degrees.

== Fauna ==
The fauna of Nu’utele Island includes a variety of reptiles, birds, and mammals. Among reptiles, the azure-tailed skink is present. Avian species commonly found on the island include the blue-crowned lory, wattled honeyeater, Samoan starling, and white-rumped swiftlet. Additional bird species recorded on the island include the crimson-crowned fruit dove and white-collared kingfisher. Migratory and invasive birds observed on Nu’utele include the brown booby, red-footed booby, great frigatebird, lesser frigatebird, blue-gray noddy, brown noddy, and white tern. Mammals on the island consist of a species of flying fox, which roosts on the island, the sheath-tailed bat, which inhabits the island's caves, the Polynesian rat, and feral pigs.

== Flora ==
The vegetation of Nu’utele Island is characterized by a coastal forest ecosystem. The ridgeline features flat terrain, while the western side is marked by steep slopes ranging from 30 to 40 degrees, and the eastern side consists of vertical cliffs. Dominant plant species on the island include Diospyros elliptica (30%), Syzygium clusiifolium (21%), Syzygium dealbatum (11%), and Terminalia catappa (11%). Other notable species include Diospyros samoensis (9%), Planchonella linggenensis (8%), and Arytera samoensis (5%). Minority species, each contributing less than 5%, include Hibiscus tiliaceus, Morinda citrifolia, Sterculia fanaiho, Hernandia sonora, Allophylus cobbe, and Psychotria insularum. Near the western shoreline and on the ridgeline, the only extant fruit-bearing trees are coconuts (Cocos nucifera).
