= Fitiuta, American Samoa =

Village on Taʻū, American Samoa

Coordinates: 14°13′20″S 169°25′25″W

Fitiuta
- Location within American Samoa
- Country: United States
- Territory: American Samoa
- County: Fitiʻuta

Population (2020)
  - Total: 120
- Time zone: UTC−11:00 (Samoa Time Zone)
- ZIP Code: 96799
- Area code: +1 684

Fitiuta, also known as Fiti'uta or Maia, is a village on the northeast coast of Taʻū island, one of the Manuʻa Islands in American Samoa. As of the 2010 United States census, it had a population of 153. The village of Fitiuta is made up of two hamlets: Maia and Leusoali'i, the latter of which is the most eastern area on the island. Historically, they were classified as villages. The town has two shops, a hotel and a church, which was recently built. Fitiuta Airport is located in the town.

The area is famed for its myths and legends. According to Samoan mythology, it was in a place called Saua in Fitiuta that the god Tagaloa decided to make the first human being and crown the first human king, the Tuimanu'a. It was also near this village that the first kava ceremony was performed.

Fitiuta is recognized as the most ancient village in the Samoan Islands. It is the oldest settlement in the Manu’a Islands. The Fagā Village Site, located in Fitiuta, is among the oldest continuously inhabited settlements in American Samoa. It features foundation ruins, stone terraces, and other archaeological structures dating back to approximately 1000 CE.

== Etymology ==
According to legends, the village was originally known as Aga'e. The village was home to the first Samoan chief, Tagaloa Ui, in ancient times. He was a mortal descendant from the gods and his daughter, Sina, was known all over the Samoan Islands for her beauty. Tuifiti, the king of Fiji, traveled to Samoa and proposed to Sina. After some time in Fiji, Sina became lonely and the chief's eldest son, Taeotagaloa, traveled to Fiji in order to bring her home. The king was sad to see Queen Sina leave and made a request for her to rename her village “Fitiuta”, which means “Fiji in the Mountains.” It can also be translated as "Inland Fiji" or “The Fijian Land”.

The name Fitiuta is derived from the combination of two words: "Fiti" (Fiji) and "uta" (land behind each village). In the typical Samoan village layout, settlements are located along the coast, facing seaward ("tai"). From Samoa, facing westward toward Fiji places it in front ("tai"), while the area behind would be referred to as “uta." If the Polynesian migratory direction was primarily eastward, the name Fitiuta would appear to be a misnomer, and a name such as Fititai or Fitiluma ("luma" meaning front) would be more appropriate. The naming of Fitiuta, situated east of Fiji, may underscore Fiji's significance during that era. This could also imply that the Polynesian migration followed a westward trajectory rather than an eastward one.

== History ==
The Faga Village Site is one of American Samoa's oldest continuously populated settlements, with foundation ruins, stone terraces and other features dating to 1000 CE. It has been named the oldest village in the Samoan Islands.

Pre-European petroglyphs have been discovered in Fitiuta Village. These engravings were created using techniques such as pecking (hammering the stone with a pointed tool), bruising (rubbing the surface with another stone), and abrading (a combination of pecking and bruising).

Traditionally, Fitiuta was divided into two distinct sections: Fitiuta-by-the-sea and Fitiuta-landwards.

On January 17, 1987, Hurricane Tusi destroyed more than a hundred structures in the villages of Sili and Fitiuta. Approximately 90% of the houses were lost.

In 2000, Paopao Faresa Eseroma of Fitiʻuta made his final public appearance on behalf of his village during the Flag Day celebrations. He was recognized as the last traditional builder of Samoan fales and also served as a member of the American Samoa House of Representatives. In addition, he served several terms as County Chief of Fitiʻuta County.

== Geography ==
The village is located on the northeast coast of Ta‘ū Island. Fitiuta is one of three villages on Ta'ū Island. On both sides of the village are steep slopes with agricultural lands on their summits, owned by Fitiuta families and certain areas communally owned by Fitiuta village. A number of fruits are grown here, including breadfruit, banana, coconut, and some taro. The village of Fitiuta is made up of two hamlets: Maia and Leusoali'i. The two Fitiuta hamlets share the same schoolhouse, dispensary building, and church.

Fiti'uta Village, like Ta‘ū Village, forms its own distinct county, as does Faleasao Village, which also constitutes a single county. This unique political structure is a defining characteristic of the villages in the Manuʻa Islands and has been in place since the establishment of governance under the first Tui Manu'a. This system is exclusive to the Manuʻa Islands and is not observed in the neighboring Tutuila and Aunuʻu Islands.

It is directly north of the National Park of American Samoa.

The climate is described as "a warm, tropical island surrounded by the South Pacific Ocean with temperatures moderated by southeast trade winds. It has humid days and nights and rainfall is abundant."

== Notable people ==
- Galea'i Peni Poumele, former Lieutenant Governor of American Samoa
