= Luanuu County =

County of American Samoa (1912–1930)

Luanuu County is a former county in the Manu'a District in American Samoa. It reported on the 1912 special census and the 1920 U.S. Census. It was subdivided into the present Ofu and Olosega Counties in 1930. It contained the villages of Ofu, Olosega and Sili.

== Demographics ==
Historical population
Year	Pop.	±%
1912	764	—
1920	716	−6.3%
U.S. Decennial Census

Luanuu County was first recorded beginning with the 1912 special census. Regular decennial censuses were taken beginning in 1920. It was dissolved and subdivided into Ofu and Olosega Counties in 1930.

== Villages ==
- Ofu
- Olosega
- Sili
