= Siʻufaga, American Samoa =

Village in American Samoa

Siʻufaga Taʻū Village (Lumā and Siʻufaga)
- Village
- Interactive map of Siʻufaga
- Country: American Samoa
- District: Manuʻa
- County: Taʻū
- Elevation: 557 m (1,827 ft)
- Time zone: UTC-11 (Samoa Standard Time)
- ZIP code: 96799
- Area code: 684
- ISO 3166 code: AS
- Vehicle registration: American Samoa

Siʻufaga is a village and third-order administrative division in the Manuʻa Islands of American Samoa. The village is situated at an approximate elevation of 557 meters above sea level. Located on Taʻū Island, it forms part of the island's primary settlement, which includes the twin villages of Lumā and Siʻufaga. The villages of Lumā and Siʻufaga are commonly jointly called Taʻū Village.

== History ==
Anthropologist Margaret Mead conducted her dissertation research on Taʻū Island in the 1920s. In a letter dated November 29, 1925, Mead described the village of Siʻufaga as being closely connected to the neighboring village of Lumā, with no discernible boundary separating the two. Together, the villages had a combined population of 580 people at the time. Mead noted that Siʻufaga held particular significance as the residence of the governor of the Manu’a Islands. The governor was described as well-educated, fluent in English, and a graduate of high school in Honolulu, Hawai'i.
