= Faga Village Site =

- Fagā Village Site
- U.S. National Register of Historic Places
- Nearest city: Fitiuta, American Samoa
- Area: 37.5 acres (15.2 ha)
- NRHP reference No.: 99001228
- Added to NRHP: November 23, 2003

The Fagā Village Site is a major archaeological site in the United States territory of American Samoa. Located on the north shore of the island of Ta'u, it is, according to local oral history, one of the oldest settlements in all of the Samoan islands, and an important site in the formation of Samoan culture. The site includes a large number of house foundations, terraces, stone walls, and other stone-built features. Excavations at the site have yielded radiocarbon dates indicating the site was occupied as far back as 1000 CE. The site continues to be of cultural importance to the local Samoan population.

The village site was listed on the National Register of Historic Places in 2003.

== See also ==
- National Register of Historic Places listings in American Samoa
