= Taʻū =

Island in the Manuʻa Islands

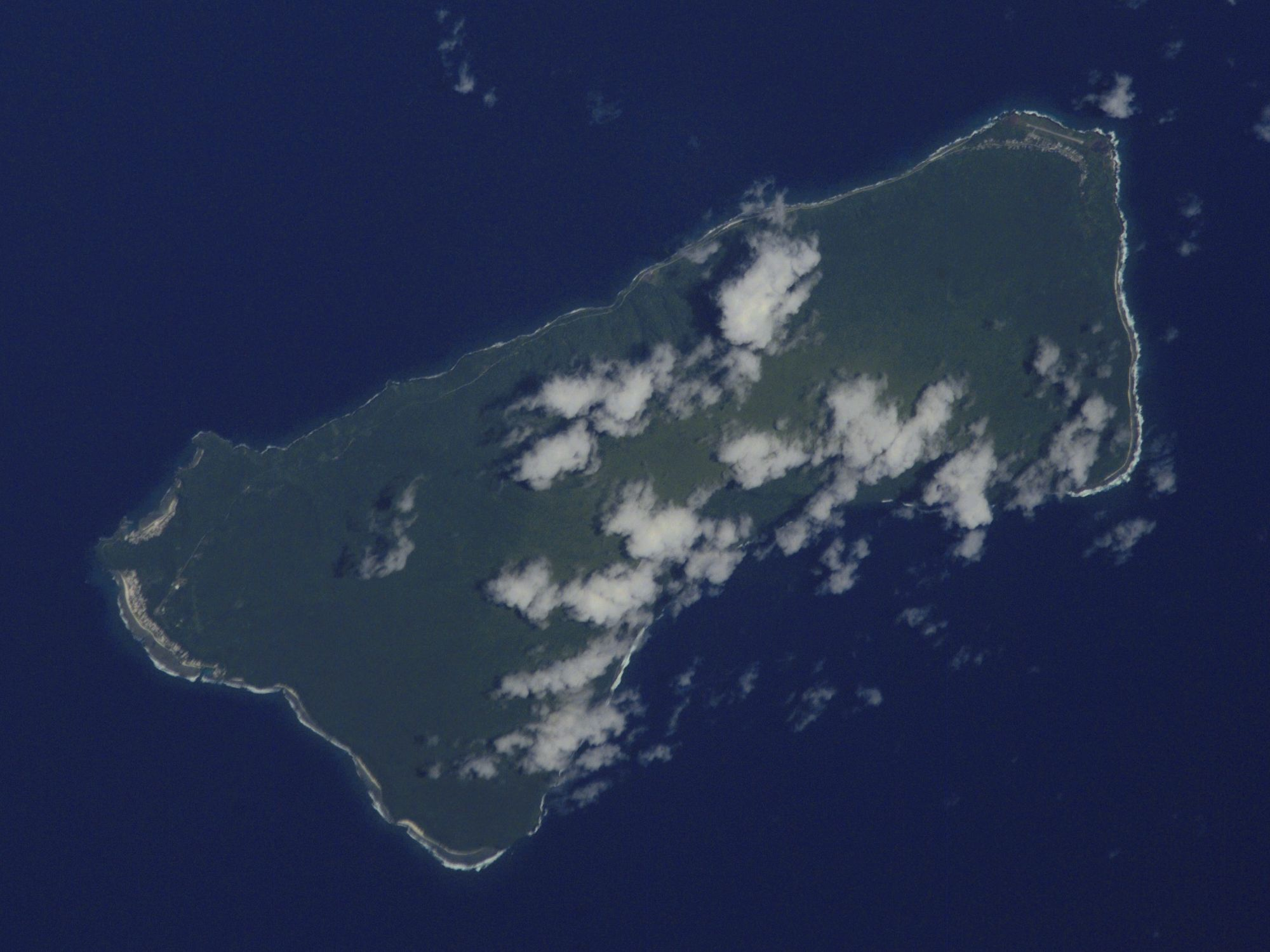
- Ta'u as seen from space
- Interactive map of Taʻū

Geography
- Location: South Pacific Ocean
- Coordinates: 14°14′S 169°28′W
- Area: 44.31 km^{2} (17.11 sq mi)
- Highest elevation: 931 m (3054 ft)
- Highest point: Lata Mountain

Administration
- United States
- Territory: American Samoa

Demographics
- Population: 790 (in 2010)

Taʻū is the largest inhabited island in the Manuʻa Islands in American Samoa and the easternmost volcanic island of the Samoan Islands. In the early 19th century, the island was sometimes called Opoun.

Taʻū is well known as the site where the American anthropologist Margaret Mead conducted her dissertation research in Samoa in the 1920s, after which she published her findings in a work titled Coming of Age in Samoa. Ta’u also has the highest mountain in American Samoa, Mount Lata, as well as 21 square kilometers (8.3 sq mi) of National Park lands, and 3.9 km^{2} (1.5 sq mi) of waters separated by some of the tallest sea cliffs in the world.

On the western coast of Taʻū are the conterminous villages of Lumā and Siufaga, usually referred to jointly as Taʻū village. The village of Taʻū has been named the capital of the Manuʻa Islands. Fitiuta is another Taʻū village, located on the northeast side of the island.

The Valley of Giants, located in the waters southwest of Taʻū, is home to one of the world's largest and oldest coral colonies. Its most notable feature is Big Momma ("Fale Bommie"), a massive coral formation standing 6.4 meters high with a circumference of 41 meters. It is estimated to be over 530 years old. It is recognized by the National Oceanic and Atmospheric Administration (NOAA) as the largest known coral head in the world. The massive Porites coral heads at Taʻū are the largest and oldest corals of their genus on Earth.

The south coast of Taʻū Island is home to the tallest sea cliffs on Earth, which rise to a height of 3,000 feet. Visitors can walk along the coastline at the base of the cliffs.

== History ==
In ancient times, the three islands of the Manuʻa Group existed as a unified polity. Taʻū served as the primary center of authority, hosting the Tui Manu'a paramount chieftaincy. In 1986, researchers uncovered ceramic-bearing locations in Taʻū Village, including a surface find of a Polynesian Plain Ware sherd. Subsequent test excavations revealed deeper cultural layers linked to the Ancestral Polynesian period. This evidence indicated that the prehistoric developments in the Manuʻa Islands generally align with those documented in larger and more thoroughly studied areas of Western Samoa.

On June 13, 1722, Commodore Jacob Roggeveen of the Dutch West India Company, commanding the Thienhoven and the Arend, approached the Manuʻa Islands from the east and sighted Taʻū Island. By early afternoon he was abreast of the villages on the western coast and sent a boat to search for an anchorage. Ashore, the people of Taʻū were astonished and fearful at the sight of ships larger than any they had known, placing offerings of food along the beach to appease what they called “The Sailing Gods.” The vessels anchored offshore, and Roggeveen's boat drew the curiosity of several men, who launched outrigger canoes and paddled through the surf. Passing by, they hailed the sailors in an unknown tongue, then pressed on to the great ships and climbed aboard. They sought to trade coconuts for metal nails, but the encounter was brief. Barely two hours after he had hove to, Roggeveen recalled his boat, dismissed the visitors, and set sail westward.

In 1832, Reverend John Williams made his second visit to the Samoan Islands, two years after his first. He landed first on Taʻū Island, where he met Hura and learned of his efforts, then continued to Ofu and Olosega - still heathen at the time - before proceeding on to Leone.

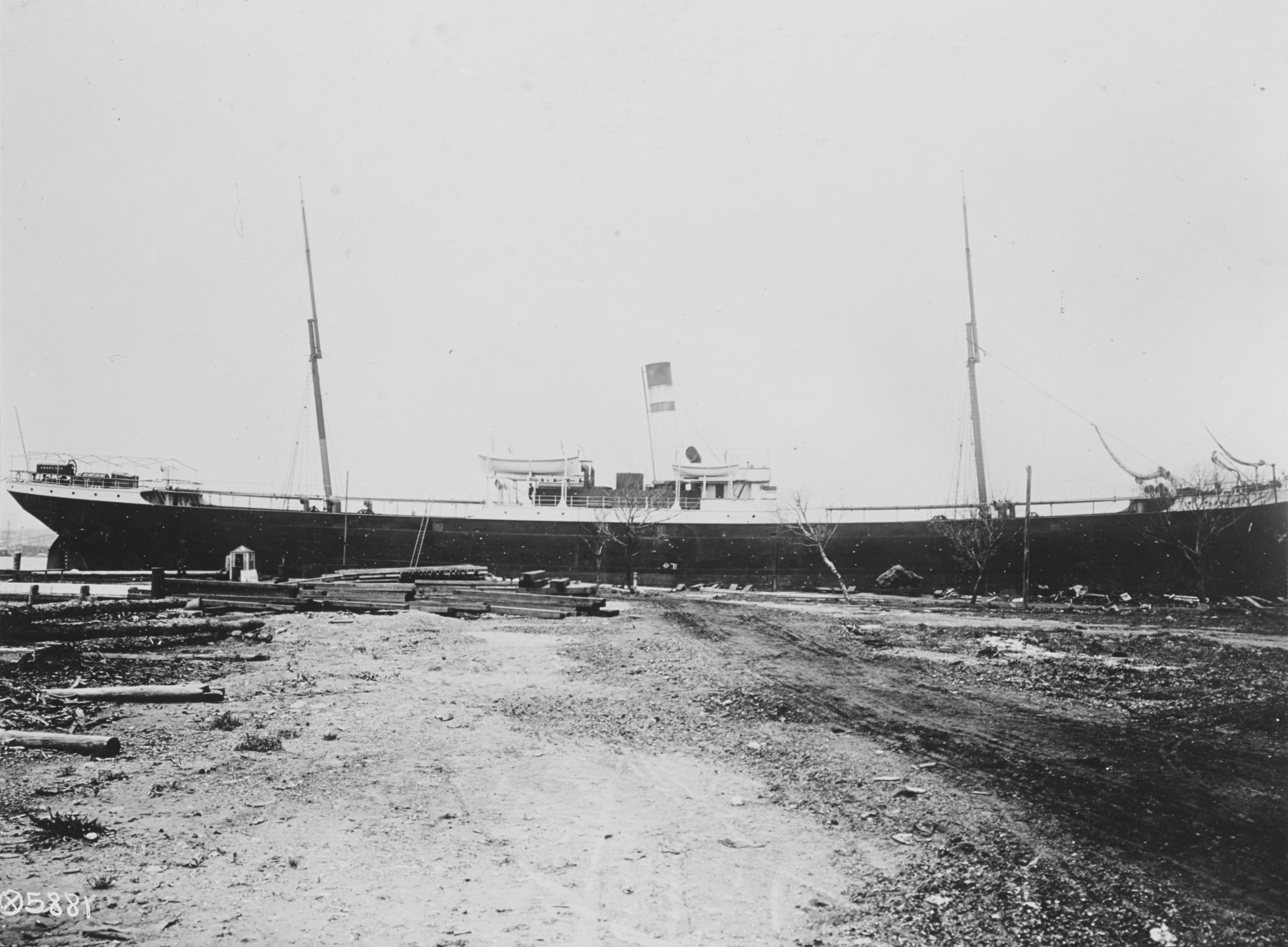
USS Abarenda

On March 11, 1900, Commander Benjamin Franklin Tilley anchored off Taʻū Village and sent a letter to the Tui Manu'a, urging him to join the chiefs of Tutuila in signing a joint Deed of Cession to the United States. The Tui Manu'a replied that he was not prepared to decide at once but agreed to meet Tilley the following day to discuss the relationship between the Manu'a Islands and the United States. While the USS Abarenda rolled offshore that afternoon, curious islanders paddled out and boarded the ship. The next morning, March 12, Tilley came ashore with Consul Luther W. Osborn, Assistant Surgeon E. M. Blackwell, and several Tutuilan chiefs. They were received by High Chief Tufele, who commanded the longboat that brought them from the Abarenda. Led to the ceremonial fale of the Tui Manu’a, they participated in a two-hour ʻAva ceremony, which concluded with the arrival of the king.

During the proceedings, Tui Manuʻa Elisala questioned the right of foreign powers to interfere in the affairs of what he considered a sovereign state. He acknowledged hearing of the favorable attitude toward the Americans in Tutuila and professed goodwill toward the United States, but firmly stated that Manu’a had no political connection with Tutuila, had avoided the conflicts that drew U.S. intervention, and was fully capable of governing itself. After lunch, perhaps influenced by Tutuilan persuasion, Tilley found the Tui Manu’a more cordial. Tilley invited him to sail back to Tutuila and take part in the signing of the Deed of Cession, but added that U.S. authority had already been proclaimed over Taʻū regardless. In the end, the Tui Manu’a permitted some of his people to attend as observers, acknowledged U.S. sovereignty in general terms, and accepted American protection - yet he remained resolute in refusing to cede his own lands on Taʻū.

In early 1987, a major hurricane struck the Manuʻa Islands, with a severe impact on Taʻū. Nearly all homes on the island were destroyed, leading to a Federal disaster declaration.

== Geography ==
The island is the eroded remnant of a hotspot shield volcano with a caldera complex or collapse feature (Liu Bench) on the south face. The summit of the island, called Lata Mountain, is at an elevation of 931 m (3,054 ft), making it the highest point in American Samoa. The last known volcanic eruption in the Manuʻa Islands was in 1866, on the mid-ocean ridge that extends west-northwest towards nearby Ofu-Olosega.

The largest airport in the Manuʻa Islands is on the northeast corner of Taʻū at Fitiʻuta. There is also a private airport. A boat harbor is located at Faleāsao at the northwestern corner of the island. A roadway along the north coast connects all of the several inhabited villages between Taʻū on the west and Fitiʻuta.

All of the southeastern half of Taʻū—including all of the rainforest on top of Lata Mountain and within the caldera—the southern shoreline, and associated coral reefs are part of the National Park of American Samoa. The park includes the ancient, sacred site of Saua, considered to be the birthplace of the Polynesian people.

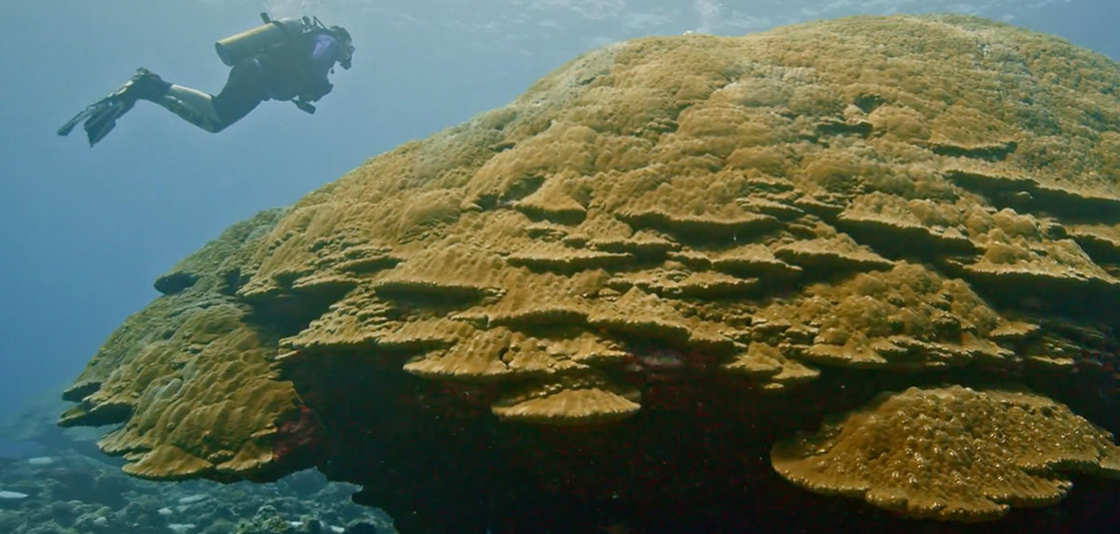
A coral colony off the island. Discovered by the National Oceanic and Atmosphere Administration, it is one of the largest colonies in the world.

Administratively, the island is divided into three counties: Faleāsao County, Fitiʻuta County, and Taʻū County. Along with the Ofu and Olosega Islands, Taʻū Island comprises the Manuʻa District of American Samoa. The land area of Taʻū Island is 44.31 km^{2} (17.11 sq mi) and it had a population of 873 persons as of the 2000 census and of 790 persons in the 2010 census.

In 2000, a subsea volcano 48 km (30 mi) from Taʻū Island was discovered by scientists. Rockne Volcano has formed an undersea mountain which is 4,300 m (14,000 ft) tall. Its peak is 5,500 m (18,000 ft) below the ocean surface.

In the southeastern part of the island are the 450-meter high Laufuti Falls waterfall. It is located a few kilometers southwest of Saua.

== National Park ==
The Taʻū unit of the American Samoa National Park spans approximately 2,025 hectares (over 5,000 acres) and constitutes the largest section of the park. It contains predominantly unaltered coastal, lowland, montane, and cloud rain forests. On the island's southern shore, Laufuti Falls descends more than 300 meters (1,000 feet) toward the ocean.

== Anthropological research ==
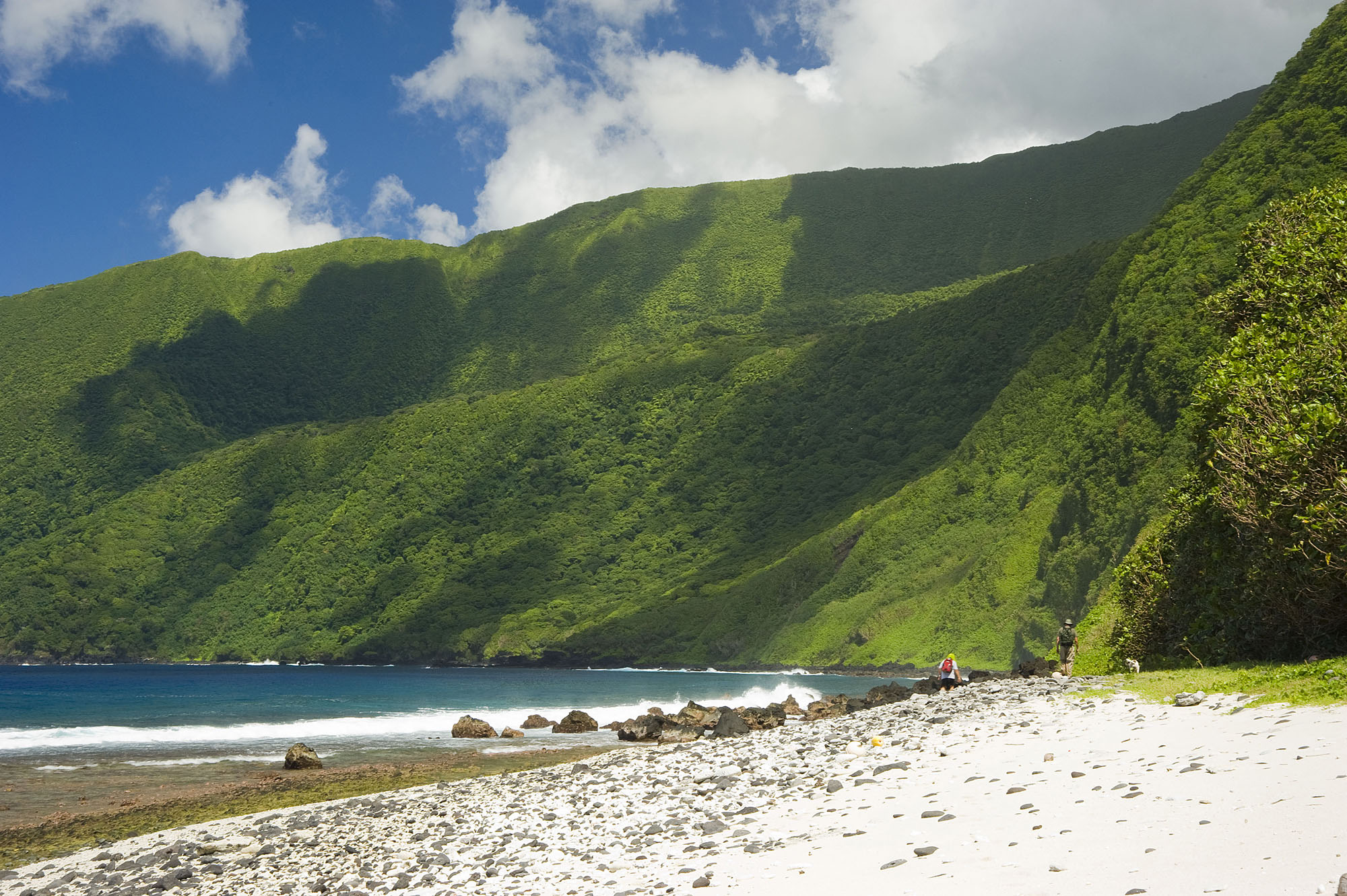
Taʻū is home to the world's tallest sea cliffs.

Taʻū is where the 23-year-old anthropologist Margaret Mead conducted her dissertation research in Samoa in the 1920s, published in 1928 as Coming of Age in Samoa. In her work, she studied adolescent girls and compared their experience to those of Western societies. She concluded that adolescence was a smooth transition, not marked by the emotional or psychological distress, anxiety, or confusion seen in the United States.

== Electricity ==
Until 2016, being a small and isolated island, the island relied on costly and polluting diesel generators to supply electricity. However, with the construction of a solar array, battery storage system, and microgrid, the island's power relies almost 100% from the sun. The solar array was built by SolarCity and now includes sixty Tesla Powerpacks. The system should be a more reliable source of energy and was designed to power the entire island for three days without sunlight and fully recharge in seven hours.
