= Olosega (disambiguation) =

Olosega may refer to one of multiple places in American Samoa:

- Olosega Island, an island in the Manuʻa Islands Group
- Olosega, American Samoa, a village in and capital of Ofu-Olosega
- Swains Island, an island disputed between American Samoa and Tokelau
