= Lata Mountain =

Summit of Taʻū island, American Samoa

- Location within American Samoa

Highest point
- Elevation: 966.2 m (3,170 ft)
- Prominence: 966.2 m (3,170 ft)
- Coordinates: 14°14′13″S 169°27′25″W

Geography
- Location: Taʻū Island, American Samoa

Climbing
- Easiest route: Hike

Lata Mountain is the summit of the island of Taʻū in the Manuʻa Islands. The summit of Lata Mountain is the highest point in American Samoa.

The easiest route up is a 2.5-mile (4.0 km) trail maintained by the National Park Service.

== See also ==
- List of mountain peaks of the United States
- List of U.S. states and territories by elevation
