= Luma, American Samoa =

Village on the island of Taʻū, American Samoa

Coordinates: 14.230°S 169.516°W

Lumā is a village on the northwest coast of Taʻū Island in American Samoa, south of the village of Taʻū and north of Siʻufaga. The last Tui Manuʻa is buried in Lumā. It is also where anthropologist Margaret Mead researched and authored her classic Coming of Age in Samoa in 1925. Lumā and neighboring Siʻufaga are subvillages of the Village of Taʻū.

The main settlement on Taʻū Island is based around the twin villages of Lumā and Siʻufaga. The Taʻū Motel is located near the small boat harbor in Lumā, known as Lumā Harbor. The harbor is mostly used by local fishing boats, and is not recommended for yachts.

On the western coast of Taʻū are the adjoining villages of Lumā and Siʻufaga, often referred to together as Taʻū Village. The Tui Manu'a made his residence in Lumā, where High Chief Sotoa and High Chief Lefiti of Siʻufaga served as his principal advisors.

== Demographics ==
Year	Population
2020	126
2010	183
2000	288
1990	293
1980	236
1970	260
1960	392

== Geography ==
It is located in Taʻū County in the Manuʻa District on Taʻū. It is bounded by one side by the Pacific Ocean and a jungle hill known as Tunoa Ridge on the other. It mostly consists of clapboard and stucco bungalows roofed with corrugated iron. Lumā is home to two large churches and one shop. It is 70 miles (110 km) of ocean from the territorial capital of Pago Pago.

== Margaret Mead ==
Anthropologist Margaret Mead traveled from Pago Pago to Lumā in 1925. The 24 year-old Mead stayed in the village for half a year while doing fieldwork such as interviewing villagers. She complained of the heat that made it impossible for her to work several hours at midday. This is also where she wrote her classic anthropological work Coming of Age in Samoa (1925). Later, a devastating hurricane left just a few houses standing in the village, and prevented Mead from interviewing villagers for several weeks.
