= Taʻū County =

County of Manu'a District, American Samoa

Coordinates: 14.230°S 169.516°W

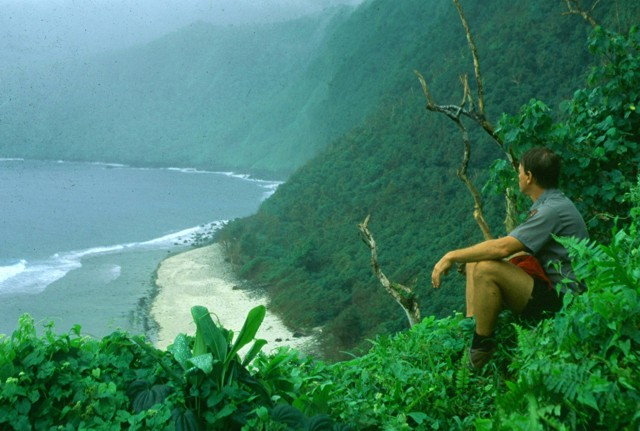
Sheer, forested cliffs on the southern side of Taʻū Island, American Samoa

Taʻū County is a county in the Manu'a District in American Samoa. Taʻū County is home to the villages of Lumā and Siʻufaga, which are commonly jointly called Taʻū Village.

Located in the waters just west of the Taʻū County is the Valley of Giants, one of the world's largest and oldest coral colonies. Among its notable features is "Big Momma," also known as "Fale Bommie," a massive coral formation standing 6.4 meters high with a circumference of 41 meters. It is estimated to be over 530 years old. According to the National Oceanic and Atmospheric Administration (NOAA), it is the largest known coral head in the world.

== Demographics ==
Historical population
Year	Pop.	±%
1912	480	—
1920	551	+14.8%
1930	562	+2.0%
1940	754	+34.2%
1950	771	+2.3%
1960	720	−6.6%
1970	540	−25.0%
1980	468	−13.3%
1990	436	−6.8%
2000	380	−12.8%
2010	358	−5.8%
2020	236	−34.1%
U.S. Decennial Census

Ta'u County was first recorded beginning with the 1912 special census. Regular decennial censuses were taken beginning in 1920. Its population zenith was in 1950, with 771 residents. It has since declined to its lowest point since the census began recording, just 358 residents. Manu'a District as a whole has similarly declined in population since that time.

== Villages ==
- Amouli, Ta'u County (now ghost)
- Lumā
- Siʻufaga
