= Ofu County =

County of Manu'a District, American Samoa

Coordinates: 14.175°S 169.618°W

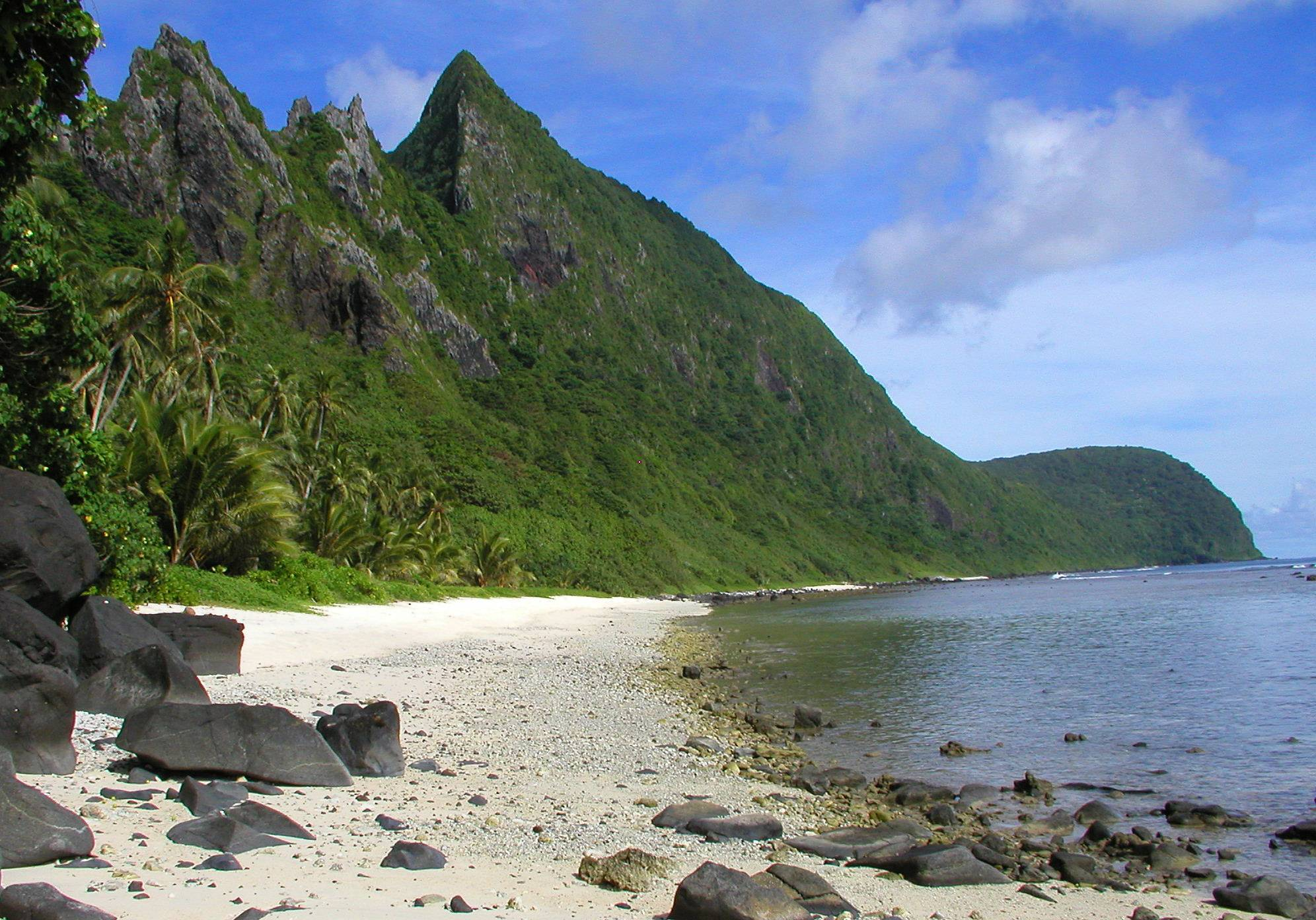
A beach in Ofu in 2006

Ofu County is a county in the Manu'a District in American Samoa. It was the result of the subdivision of the prior Luanuu County in two, with the other newly created county being Olosega, first reported on the 1930 U.S. Census. It is now contiguous with its only village, Ofu.

== Demographics ==
Historical population
Year	Pop.	±%
1930	466	—
1940	500	+7.3%
1950	576	+15.2%
1960	605	+5.0%
1970	412	−31.9%
1980	345	−16.3%
1990	353	+2.3%
2000	289	−18.1%
2010	176	−39.1%
2020	132	−25.0%
U.S. Decennial Census

Ofu County was first recorded beginning with the 1930 U.S. Census. It had previously been within Luanuu County. Its population zenith was in 1960, with 605 residents. It has since experienced a dramatic population decline (as has the Manu'u District), losing over 2/3 of its population as of 2010.

== History ==
In 1921, Governor Waldo A. Evans established a dispensary on Ofu to improve medical services for the Manuʻa Islands. The chosen site was Toaga, on the Ofu side of the lagoon that links Ofu and Olosega, as it offered convenient access to both islands. Once the facility opened, however, the district health officer discovered that locals avoided it. The mountain behind Toaga was believed to house the most malevolent spirits in Manuʻa, and people hurried past the area in fear. At first, the U.S. Navy–run Public Health Department resisted yielding to such beliefs, but eventually conceded and relocated the dispensary to Ofu Village.

== Geography ==
Vaoto Marine Reserve, spanning 16 hectares (40 acres), is situated seaward of the Ofu Airport landing strip and Vaoto Lodge, adjacent to the Ofu unit of the National Park of American Samoa. Its establishment aimed to protect a coral reef and sandy beach that are easily accessible to visitors. The reserve is notable for hosting a remarkable population of Blue coral (Heliopora coerulea), a rare and threatened species.

The Ofu unit of the National Park of American Samoa encompasses approximately 607 hectares (1,500 acres), featuring a coral reef and lagoon alongside a white-sand beach. This environment supports hundreds of reef fish species, corals, and various marine organisms. The beach, flanked by mist-shrouded rainforest pinnacles and sculpted volcanic rock formations, is regarded as one of the most exquisite in the South Pacific. The Ofu unit also provides the park's most accessible snorkeling opportunities.

=== Villages ===
- Alaufau (now defunct and within Ofu)
- Ofu

Ofu County and its namesake island encompass a single settlement known as Ofu Village, which is divided into two main sections: Ofu and Alaufau. These sectors occupy the western coastal terrace, situated adjacent to a sheltered reef flat and lagoon. The lagoon lies opposite Nuʻutele Island and Nuʻusilaelae Island, while the largest stretch of arable mountain slope lies inland. Historically, additional coastal villages on Ofu Island occupied parts of the southern and southeastern shoreline, including the area called Toʻaga. Limited archaeological evidence suggests that, in later prehistoric times, some habitation may also have spread inward, into the region used for intensive gardening. Although many houses in Ofu Village have been rebuilt using modern materials such as concrete and corrugated metal, the village retains a traditional layout. At its core is the malae — an open common space used for gatherings and ceremonies—bordered by the community church and the guest house of the high chief, which doubles as the meeting place for the American Samoa Fono. Individual household plots, conceptually stretching from the beachfront to the mountain slope, are arranged along the island's central sandy roadway.
