= Fitiʻuta County =

County of Manu'a District, American Samoa

Coordinates: 14°13′20″S 169°25′25″W

Fitiʻuta County is an administrative county in the Manu'a District of American Samoa, a U.S. territory in the South Pacific (counties in American Samoa are minor civil divisions used by the U.S. Census Bureau for population and housing statistics). Fitiʻuta is one of three counties on Taʻū Island, alongside Faleāsao and Taʻū counties, and it includes the villages of Leusoaliʻi and Maia.

The name Fitiʻuta is derived from Samoan language elements: Fiti (referring to Fiji) and uta (meaning “land behind” or inland). In Samoan traditional geography, uta describes areas inland from the coast (tai), and the combined form is commonly interpreted as “Inland Fiji.”

== Demographics ==
Historical population
Year	Pop.	±%
1912	315	—
1920	335	+6.3%
1930	402	+20.0%
1940	494	+22.9%
1950	559	+13.2%
1960	596	+6.6%
1970	492	−17.4%
1980	407	−17.3%
1990	454	+11.5%
2000	358	−21.1%
2010	270	−24.6%
2020	213	−21.1%
U.S. Decennial Census

Fiti'uta County was first recorded beginning with the 1912 special census. Regular decennial censuses were taken beginning in 1920.

Fitiuta County had a population of 213 in 2020, reflecting demographic trends tracked over several decades. The county is part of the remote Manuʻa island group, which has experienced population decline as residents migrate for economic opportunities.

== Villages ==
- Leusoali'i
- Maia
