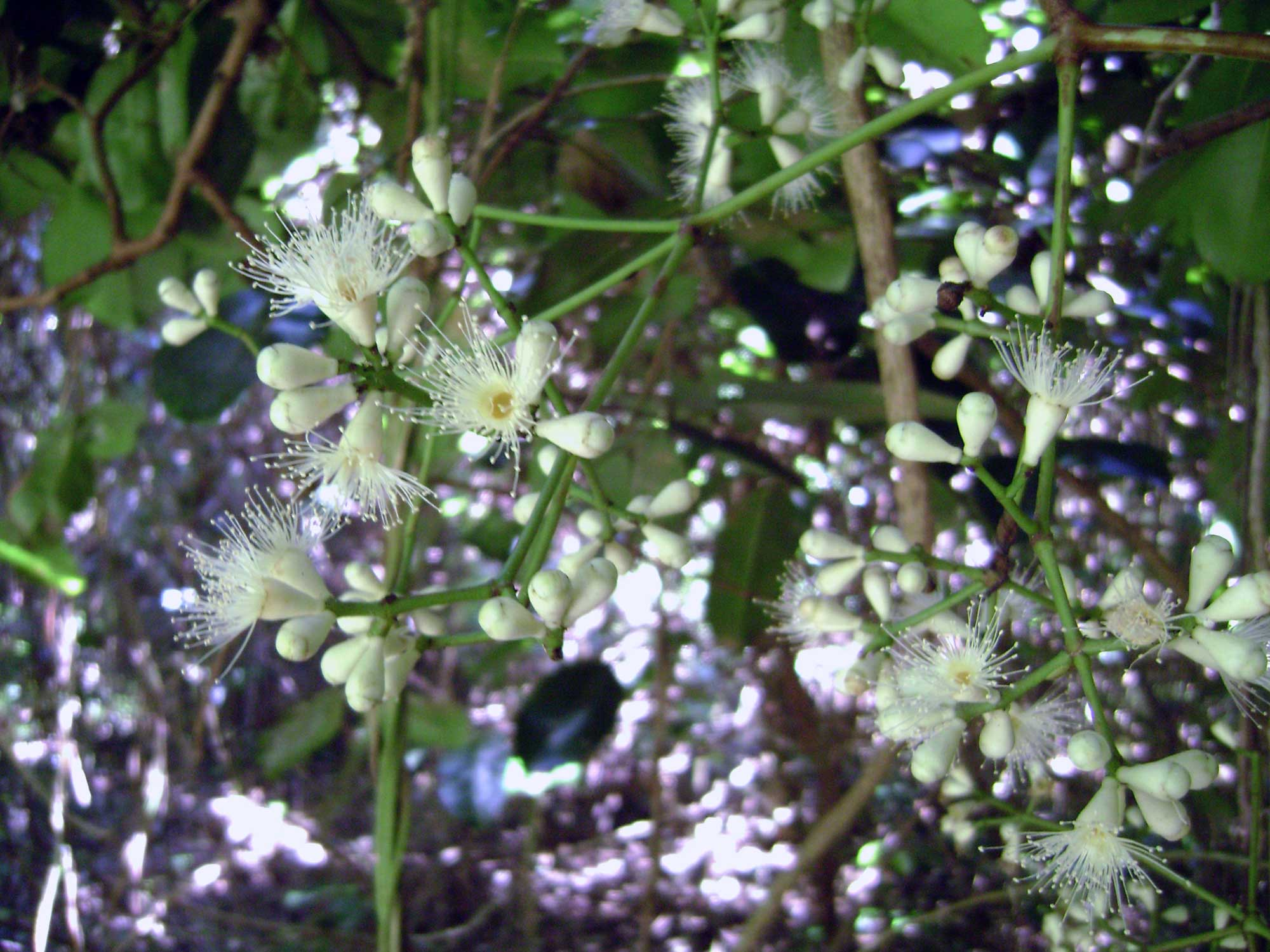

Conservation status
- Least Concern (IUCN 3.1)

Scientific classification
- Kingdom: Plantae
- Clade: Tracheophytes
- Clade: Angiosperms
- Clade: Eudicots
- Clade: Rosids
- Order: Myrtales
- Family: Myrtaceae
- Genus: Syzygium
- Species: S. dealbatum

Binomial name
- Syzygium dealbatum (Burkill) A.C.Sm. (1959)

Synonyms
- Eugenia dealbata Burkill (1901)

= Syzygium dealbatum =

Species of flowering plant

Syzygium dealbatum is a species of flowering plant in the myrtle family, Myrtaceae. It is a tree native to Niue, the Samoan Islands, Tonga, and Wallis and Futuna.

It is a small tree native to lowland forest. In Tonga it grows in forests over thinner, drier soils on coastal dunes and relatively recent lava and ash deposits, where the tree Casuarina equisetifolia is predominant, along with Pandanus tectorius, Hibiscus tiliaceus, and Scaevola taccada.
