= Mount Piumafua =

Mountain

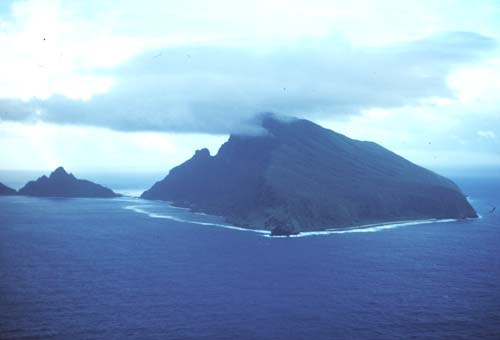
- areal view of the mountain.

Highest point
- Elevation: 545 ft (166 m)
- Coordinates: 14.170°S 169.620°W

Geography

Geology
- Mountain type: Shield
- Last eruption: 1886

Mount Piumafua is a volcano type mountain located on Piumafua, American Samoa and is the tallest mountain on the island. The mountain is 2,064 feet at its peak height. The volcano last erupted in 1886. it is located about 120 km east of Pago Pago, the capital.

== Climate ==
The climate is moderate. The average temperature is 66 °F (19 °C) . The warmest month is January, at 71.6 °F (22 °C), and the coldest is August, at 57 °F (14 °C). The average rainfall is 9.6 inches (2,642 millimeters) per year. The wettest month is December, at 18.1 inches (429 millimeters) of rain, and the driest is August, at 3.5 inches (88 millimeters).
