= Olosega County =

Part of Manu'a District, American Samoa

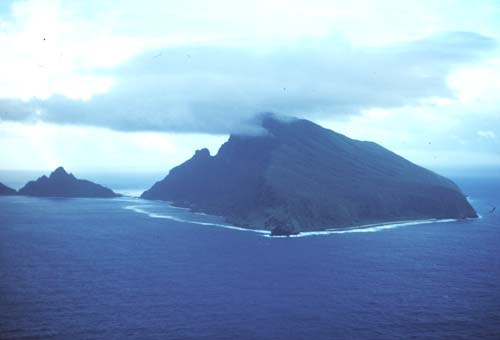
- Aerial view of Olosega
- Interactive map of Olosega County

Geography
- Location: Pacific Ocean
- Coordinates: 14°10′36.39″S 169°37′26.79″W
- Archipelago: Ofu-Olosega

Administration
- American Samoa
- Manu'a District

Demographics
- Population: c. 147 (2020)

Olosega County is a county in the Manu'a District in American Samoa. It comprises the eastern half of the twin islands of Ofu-Olosega. It includes the villages of Olosega and Sili, and was home to roughly 147 residents in 2020. The topography is characterized by volcanic terrain, and coral reefs in the surrounding seas with diverse aquatic life.

== Geography ==
Olosega is a county in the Manu'a District in American Samoa. It comprises the eastern half of the twin islands of Ofu-Olosega, and includes the villages of Olosega and Sili. The twin islands are located approximately 65 miles (105 km) east of Tutuila, the largest island of American Samoa, and Olosega is the smallest island in Manu'a. Olosega County has existed since 1930, when Luanuu County was split to create separate counties of Ofu and Olosega.

The name Olosega, is derived from the Samoan language and translates as "Fortress of Parakeets". The islands were formed by the activity of shield volcanoes. The topography consists of volcanic slopes, and coral reefs in the surrounding seas.

== Demographics ==
Historical population

Year	Pop.	±%
1930	438	—
1940	509	+16.2%
1950	545	+7.1%
1960	429	−21.3%
1970	380	−11.4%

Year	Pop.	±%
1980	249	−34.5%
1990	225	−9.6%
2000	216	−4.0%
2010	177	−18.1%
2020	147	−16.9%

U.S. Decennial Census

Olosega County was first recorded with a population of 438 individuals in the 1930 U.S. Census. The population reached its maximum in 1950 with 545 residents and has since declined to just 147 residents as of 2020. Various fruits and nuts are grown in the region.

== Transportation ==
An airport is located in the nearby Ofu island, which is connected to Tutuila by small planes, operated by the Samoa Airways. Small boats and ferry services provide limited connectivity to the region.
