= Ofu Airport =

Airport in Ofu, American Samoa

- IATA: OFU; ICAO: NSAS; FAA LID: Z08

Summary
- Airport type: Public
- Owner: Government of American Samoa
- Location: Ofu, American Samoa, United States
- Elevation AMSL: 9 ft (2.7 m)
- Coordinates: 14°11′04″S 169°40′12″W

Map
- Location within American Samoa

Runways
Direction	Length		Surface
Direction	ft	m	Surface
08/26	2,000	610	Concrete

Statistics (2004)
- Aircraft operations: 1,944
- Source: Federal Aviation Administration

Ofu Airport (IATA: OFU, ICAO: NSAS, FAA LID: Z08) is a public airport located one mile (2 km) southeast of the village of Ofu on the island of Ofu in American Samoa, an unincorporated territory of the United States. This airport is publicly owned by Government of American Samoa.

The Ofu runway was driven as part of the Google Street View project; users looking at Street View imagery at this location will get a view from the runway as opposed to the road which was apparently under construction when the photos were taken.

== History ==
Originally constructed in 1974, the airport runway was moved to its current location in 1986.

== Facilities and aircraft ==
Ofu Airport covers an area of 18 acres (7.3 ha) and has one paved runway (8/26) measuring 2,000 x 60 ft (610 x 18 m).

For 12-month period ending December 30, 2004, the airport had 1,944 aircraft operations, an average of 5 per day, 100% of which were air taxi flights.

== Airlines and destinations ==
Samoa Airways connects Ofu Airport to Pago Pago International Airport.

== See also ==
- List of airports in American Samoa
