= Ofu-Olosega =

Twin islands in the Manuʻa Islands

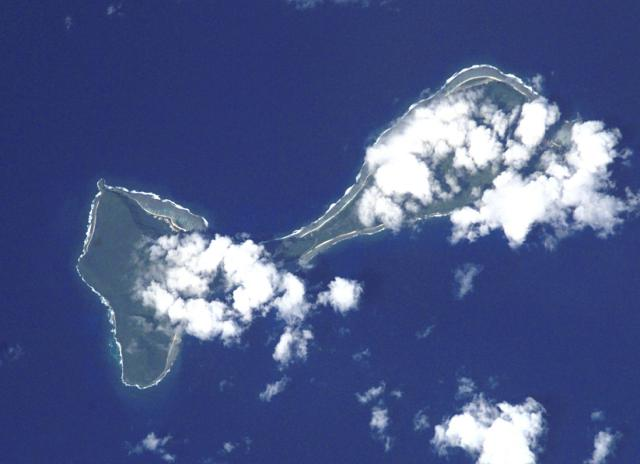
- Ofu-Olosega from the Space Shuttle

Highest point
- Elevation: 639 m (2,096 ft)
- Prominence: 639 m (2,096 ft)
- Coordinates: 14.175°S 169.618°W

Geography
- Location: American Samoa
- Topo map: USGS

Geology
- Mountain type: Shield volcanoes
- Last eruption: September to November 1866

Ofu and Olosega are parts of a volcanic doublet in the Manuʻa Islands, which is a part of American Samoa in the Samoan Islands. These twin islands, formed from shield volcanoes, have a combined length of 6 km and a combined area of 12 square kilometers (5 square miles). Together, they have a population of about 500 people. Geographically, the islands are volcanic remnants separated by the narrow, 137-meter-wide (449-foot) Āsaga Strait, composed of shallow-water coral reef. Before 1970, people crossed between the two islands by waiting until low tide and then wading across the shallow water of the strait. Since 1970, there has been a bridge over the strait, providing a single-lane road that connects the two islands.

The highest peak on Ofu Island is Mount Tumutumu (also called Tumu), at 491 m (1,611 ft). The highest peak on Olosega is Mount Piumafua, at 629 m (2,064 ft). The most recent volcanic eruption was in 1866, 3 km (1.9 mi) southeast of Olosega.

Pre-historic artifacts discovered on Ofu by archaeological field work in the 1980s significantly furthered understanding of the ancient history of Ofu in particular, and the Samoa Islands and Polynesia in general. The artifacts include ceramics, adzes, and worked shell and bone pieces. Samples of red-slipped plainware ceramics were found that appear to have been crafted in the tradition of the Lapita culture. The field work, carried out by a team that included Pacific archaeology specialist Patrick Vinton Kirch, focused on a site called To'aga (site AS-13-1), a 2 km (1.2 mi) coastal stretch on the south coast of Ofu. Dating of the artifacts suggested that Ofu has been continuously inhabited by humans for about 3,000 years.

== History ==
Notable archaeologists Patrick Kirch and Terry Hunt identified pottery on the south coast of Ofu Island dated to about 1850 BCE, the earliest recorded in the Samoan Islands and earlier than comparable finds in Tonga and Fiji.

=== First Western contact ===
On June 13, 1722, Commodore Jacob Roggeveen of the Dutch West India Company, commanding the Thienhoven and Arend, approached the twin islands of Olosega and Ofu. Fishermen from Olosega quickly alerted the High Chief of Ofu, who was prepared when the ships entered the bay along the islands’ southern shore. As the traditional guardian of the Manuʻa Islands, it was his duty to challenge visitors before allowing them to land. According to custom, a representative of the newcomers was expected to fight a war-club duel with his champion to determine their right of entry. The genuineness of combat varied depending on the visitors’ known reputation, but the ritual could not be ignored. The High Chief assembled his warriors on the beach at Ofu and launched his war canoe, bringing with him the village virgin dressed in her ceremonial fine-mat skirt and blue necklace. When he drew within hailing distance of Roggeveen’s small boat, he gestured for the strangers to come ashore. Sensing their hesitation at the sight of armed men, he dispersed the warriors with a signal, which seemed to reassure the visitors. They rowed closer, but it is unlikely they actually landed—the reef passage was treacherous, night was approaching, and the reception remained uncertain. The meeting therefore likely took place in the bay.

The High Chief admired the girl’s necklace and indicated his desire for another. The Dutchmen responded by gesture that they had none to give. After a short but cordial exchange, the boat returned to the ships, and the squadron soon set sail westward. Whether Roggeveen was truly the first European to visit Samoa has been debated. The people of Taʻū already seemed familiar with iron nails, and one of the girls wore a blue necklace, which could only have been made of glass beads — since no blue coral exists in Samoa. These items may have reached the islands through Fiji or Tonga, both of which had prior European contact and traded frequently with Samoa.

In 1768, the French explorer Louis Antoine de Bougainville arrived from the east with his ships L'Étoile and La Boudeuse, anchoring off Ofu and Olosega. There he traded trinkets for fresh fruit and was struck by the skill with which the Samoans handled their canoes. In admiration, he named their homeland Les Îles des Navigateurs - the Navigator Islands. Although he sighted other parts of Samoa, he made no landings beyond these two islands.

The first European known to set foot in Samoa was Jean-François de Galaup, comte de Lapérouse, commander of the French ships Boussole and L’Astrolabe. In 1787 he sailed past the northern coast of Taʻū, traded with the people of Olosega, and three days later approached Tutuila from the north.

== Ofu ==
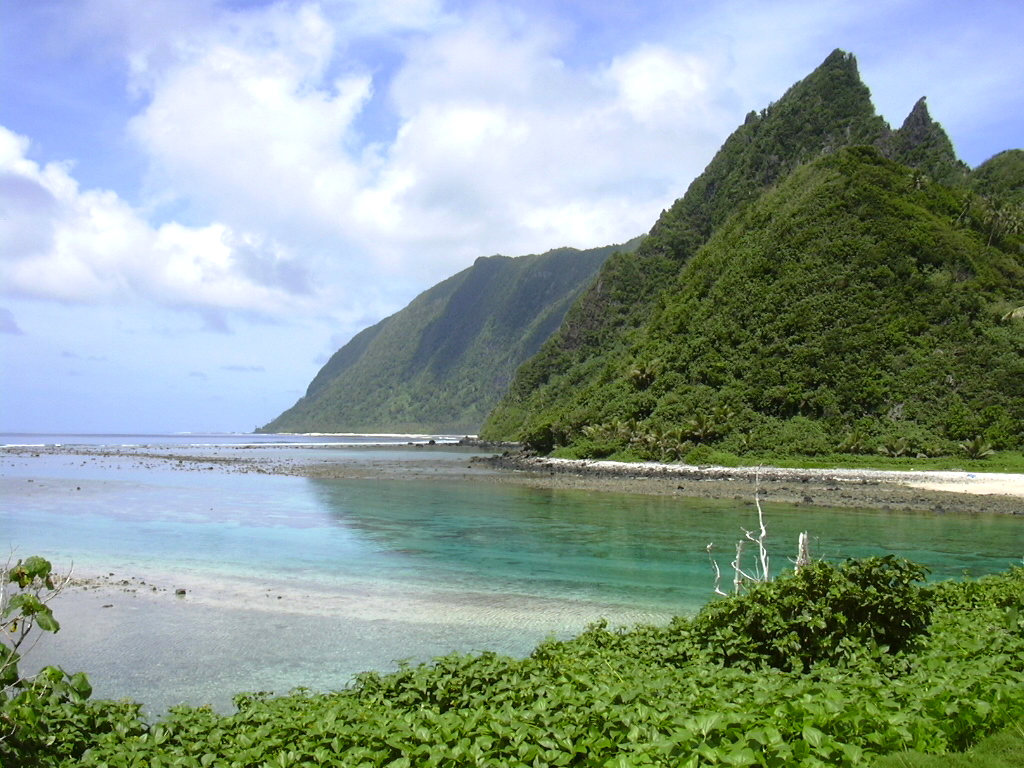
South shore of Ofu seen from Olosega across the narrow strait that separates them. The sharp peak, an eroding dike complex, is named Sunu'itao.

Ofu is the western part of the volcanic outcrop of Ofu-Olosega Island and the westernmost of the Manu'a Islands. The main village of Ofu is located on the western shore, protected behind an offshore islet (eroded tuff cone) known as Nuʻutele Island. Ofu has a small airport (IATA: OFU, ICAO: NSAS) and a boat harbor that serve the population on Ofu and Olosega. The twice-weekly flight from Pago Pago takes about half an hour.

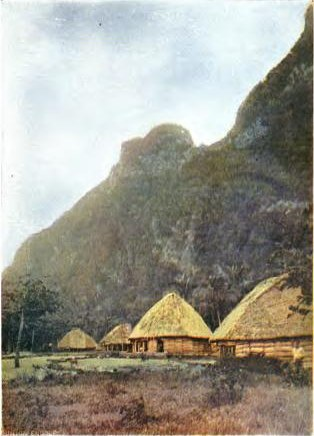
Olosega village 1896

Most of the southern shore and associated coral reef are part of the National Park of American Samoa.

The island forms the Ofu County subdivision of the Manuʻa District. It has a land area of 7.215 km^{2} (2.786 sq mi), and had an official population of 176 persons as of the 2010 census.

Situated on the south coast of the island is To'aga lagoon which has a high diversity of corals and fishes. The marine site has been part of long term research and study on coral reefs and global climate change.

The island is also home to the Samoa Flying-fox (Pteropus samoensis), a species of bat threatened by habitat loss.

== Olosega ==
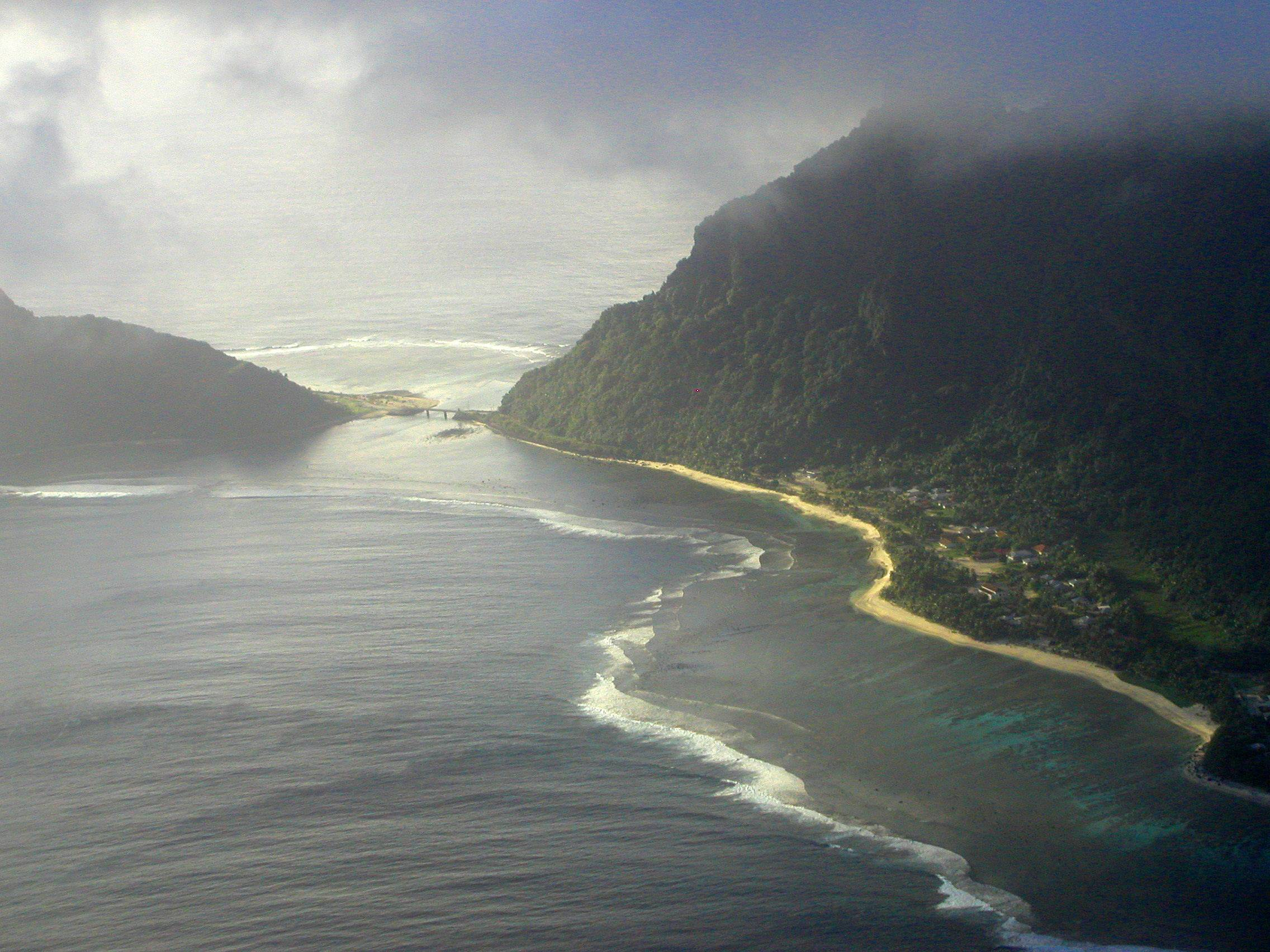
Aerial view - Olosega village on the right, Ofu on the left. Both islands are connected via a single-lane bridge, crossing the Asaga strait.

Olosega is the smallest island in the Manuʻa Islands. It is possible to walk across to Ofu Island at low tide. The name derives from Samoan ʻOlosega, "fortress of parakeets."

Olosega Island is a remnant of the Sili shield volcano, the caldera of which may lie submerged off the north shore.

The volcanic eruption of 1866 was actually 3 km (1.9 mi) east of Olosega, on a mid-ocean ridge that extends east southeast to nearby Taʻū.

The island forms the Olosega County subdivision of the Manuʻa District. It has a land area of 5.163 km^{2} (1.993 sq mi), and had an official population of 172 persons as of the 2010 census.

Almost all the population of Olosega now reside in Olosega village along the southwestern-facing shore. Olosega also has Olosega Elementary School with instruction through grade 8 for children on both islands.

Sili, situated on the northwestern-facing shore, consists of but one standing inhabited residence after much of the village was destroyed by cyclones (and subsequently abandoned).

Lalomoana and Faiava are other named places but are not inhabited.

== Gallery ==
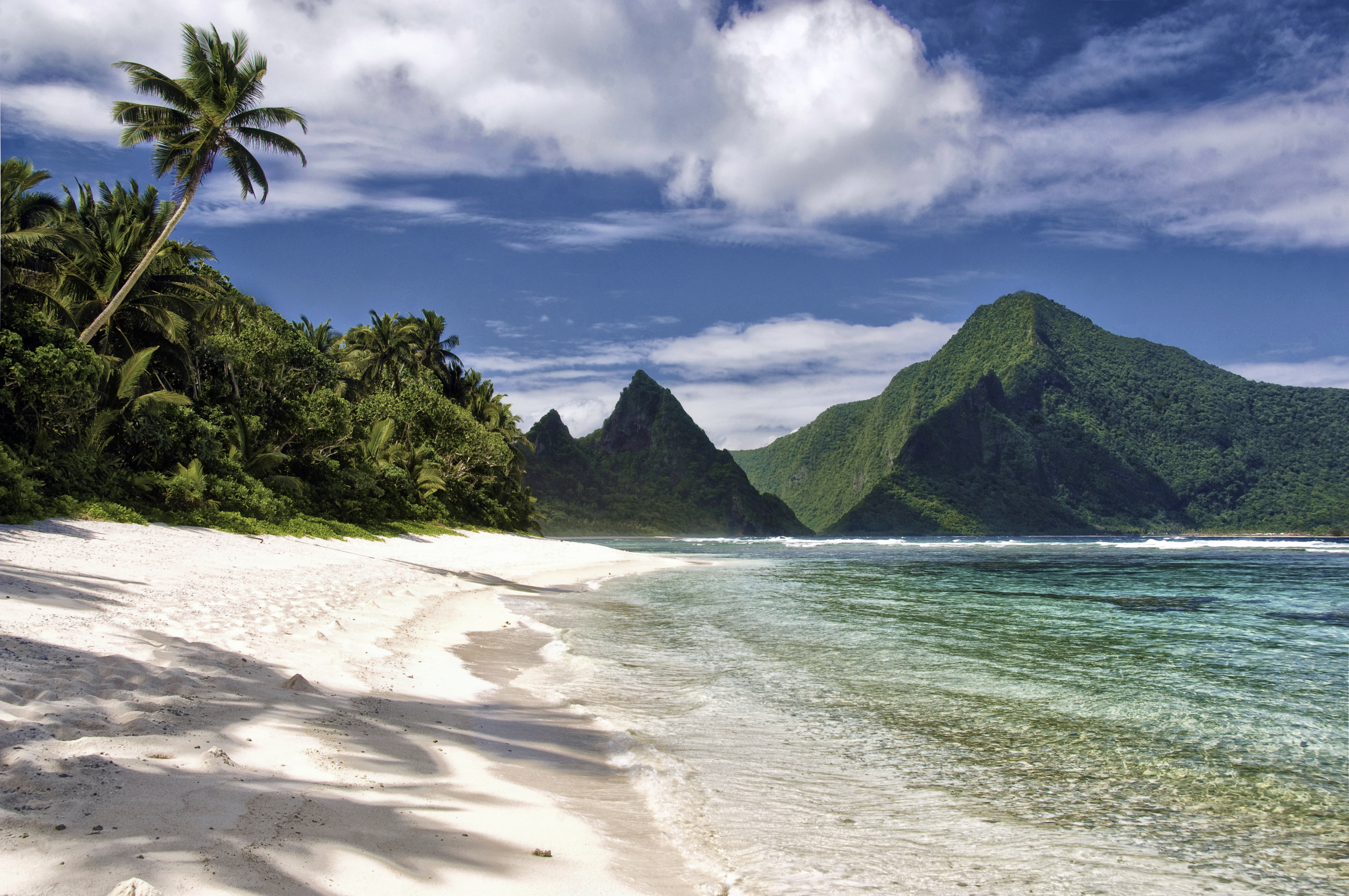

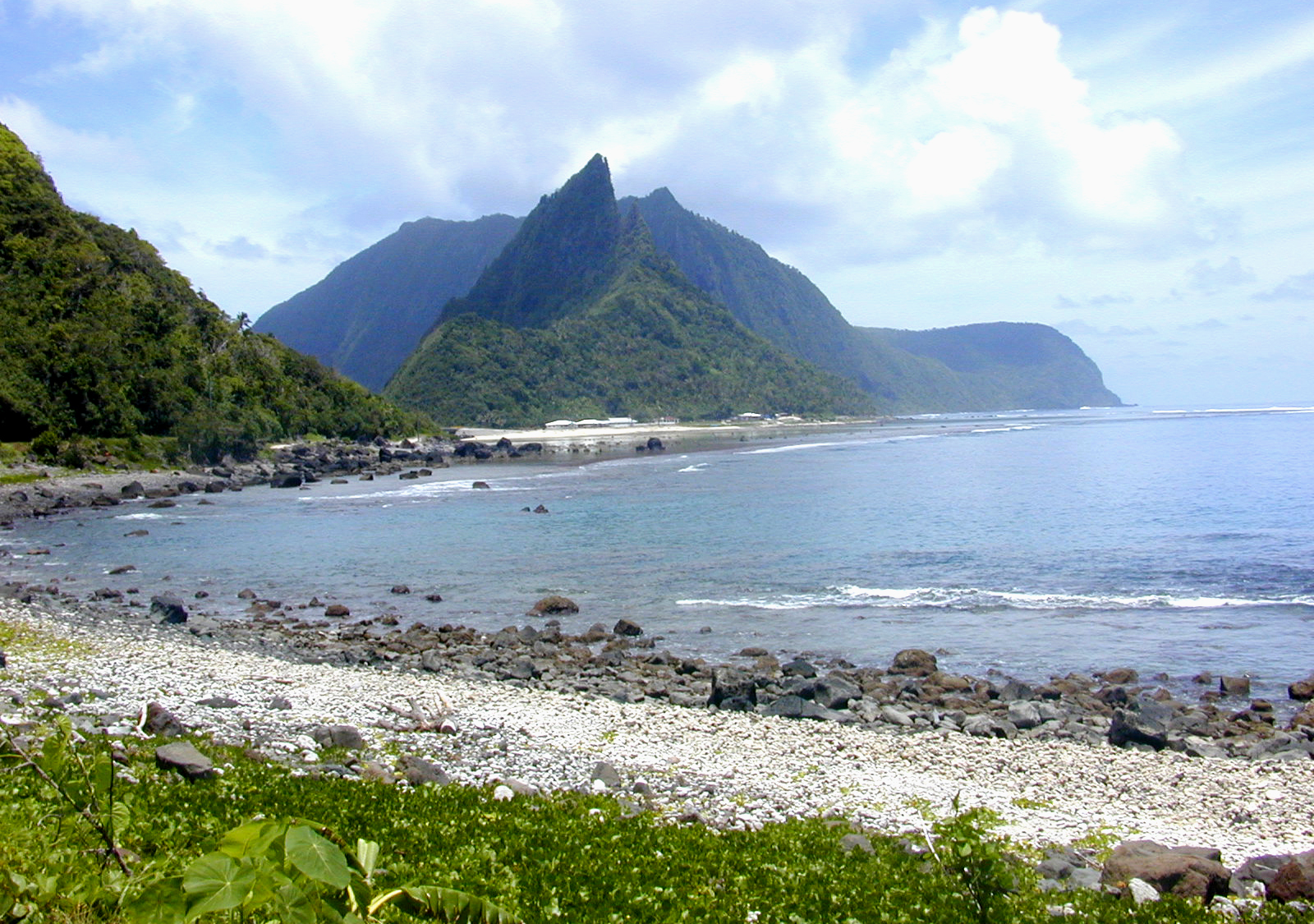

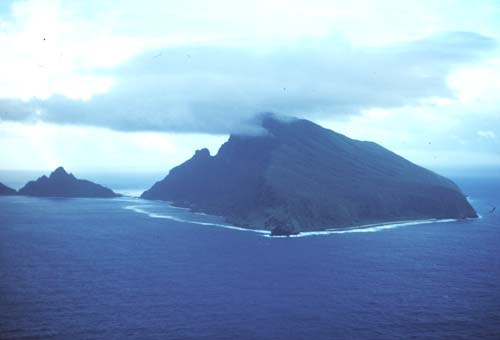

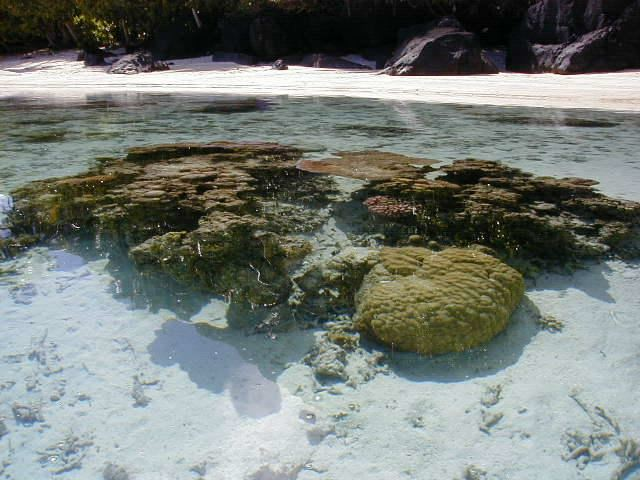

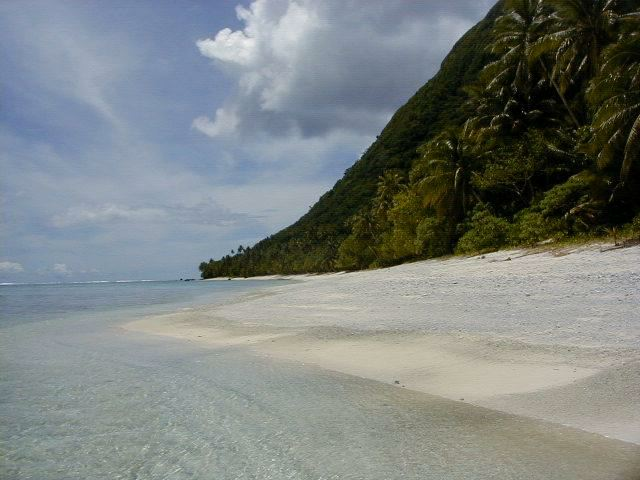

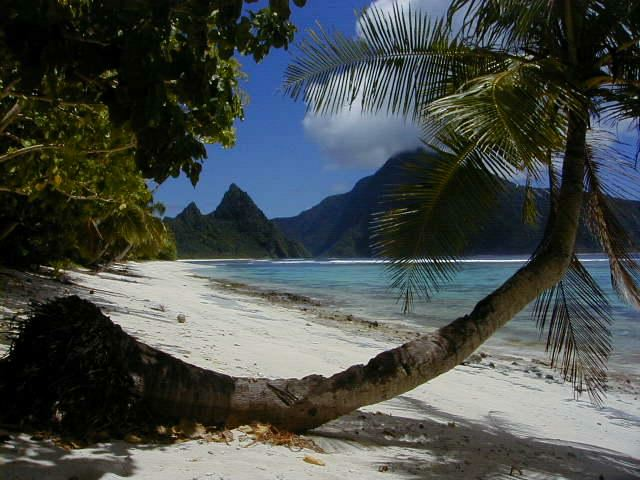

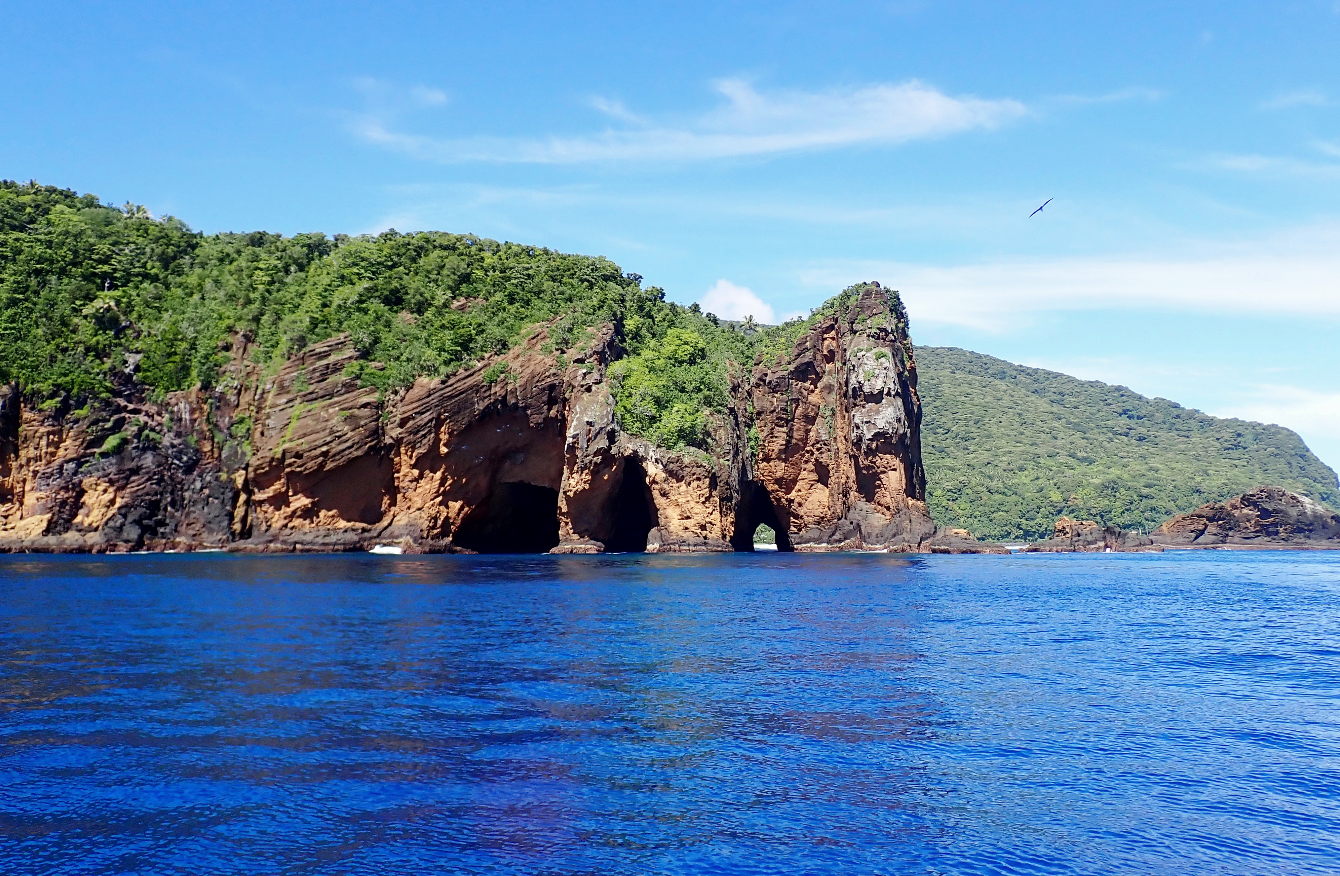
