= Manuʻa Islands =

Island group of American Samoa

Manuʻa tele
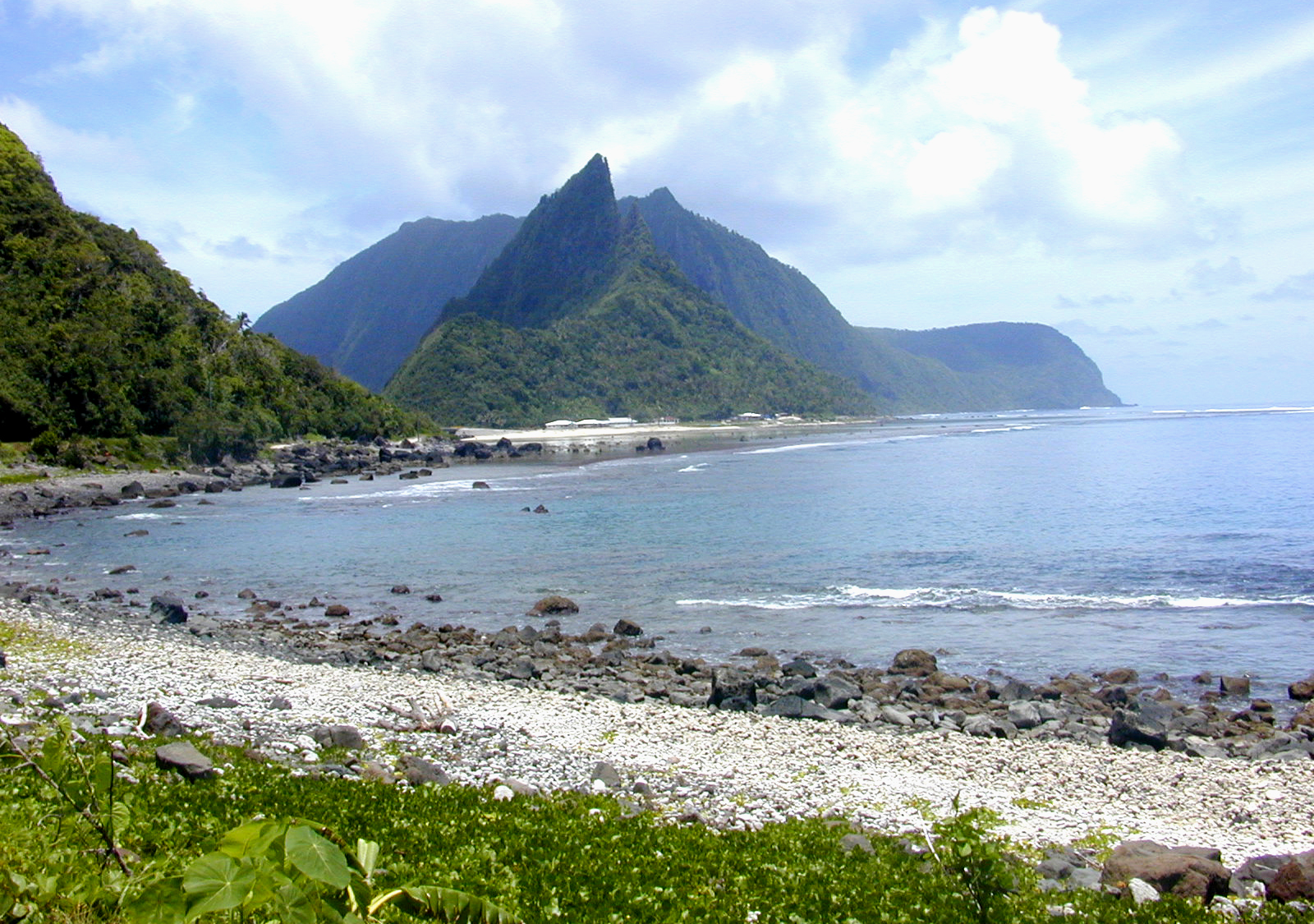
- The Islands of Ofu and Olosega viewed from the village of Sili along the north shore of Olosega. The middle peak is Sunuʻitao on Ofu, across the narrow strait at Asaga from Olosega (foreground and mountain on left)

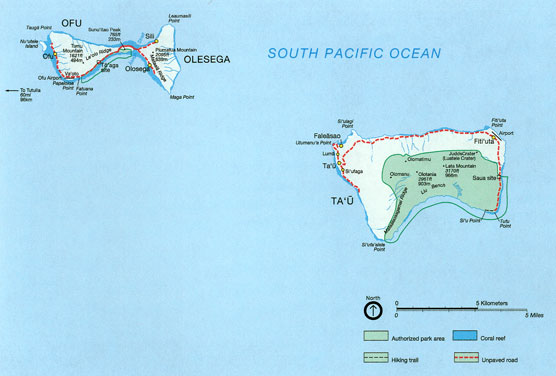
- Map of the Manu'a islands

Geography
- Location: Pacific Ocean
- Coordinates: 14°12′31″S 169°33′10″W
- Archipelago: Samoan Islands
- Area: 56 km^{2} (22 sq mi)
- Highest elevation: 931 m (3054 ft)

Administration
- United States
- Territory: American Samoa

Demographics
- Population: 1,400

The Manuʻa Islands, or the Manuʻa tele (Samoan: Manuʻa tele), in the Samoan Islands, consists of three main islands: Taʻū, Ofu and Olosega. The latter two are separated only by the shallow, 137-meter-wide Āsaga Strait, and are now connected by a bridge over the strait. The islands are located some 110 kilometers (68 miles) east of Tutuila and are a part of American Samoa, an unincorporated territory of the United States. Their combined area is 56 square kilometers (22 square miles), and they have a total population of 1,400. Taʻu is the largest of these islands, with an area of 44 km^{2} (17 sq mi), and it has the highest point of the Manuʻa, at 931 meters (3,054 feet). Politically, the islands form the Manuʻa District, one of the three administrative divisions of American Samoa.

Manu'a was the political centre of the Tui Manu’a Empire for many centuries, until the rise of the Tu'i Tonga maritime empire, which led to a shift in power from the eastern islands of Samoa to its western islands.

== Geography ==
All three islands are volcanic islands: volcanic remnants rising out of the sea 14° south of the equator. The islands are elevated and mountainous. In contrast to most places in the world, the population of these islands has been decreasing steadily for decades. In the 1930s some 20% of the population of American Samoa lived in the Manuʻa Islands. By the 1980s, only 6% were located there. Emigration is the consequence of a lack of economic opportunities and a desire of young people to participate in the more modern lifestyle offered on Tutuila. All the land of Manuʻa is owned communally by Samoan families of Manuʻa. This includes the National Parks lands which are only leased to the US National Parks system for 50 years.

Minor islands within the Manuʻa District include Nuutele Island, Nuusilaelae Island, and Nuupule Rock.

The sea cliffs located on the southern coast of Taʻū Island in Manuʻa rise to an elevation of 3,000 feet, making them the tallest sea cliffs in the world.

Alei Ridge on Taʻū Island is home to flora including Dysoxylum samoense. Alei Plateau, adjacent to the ridge, was used by Samoans for its forest resources, with a 2006 ethnobotanical survey revealing remains of star mounds, terraces, ditches, house platforms, a grave site, and artifacts such as stone adzes and grinding stones. The ridge and plateau are now part of the National Park of American Samoa.

=== District divisions ===
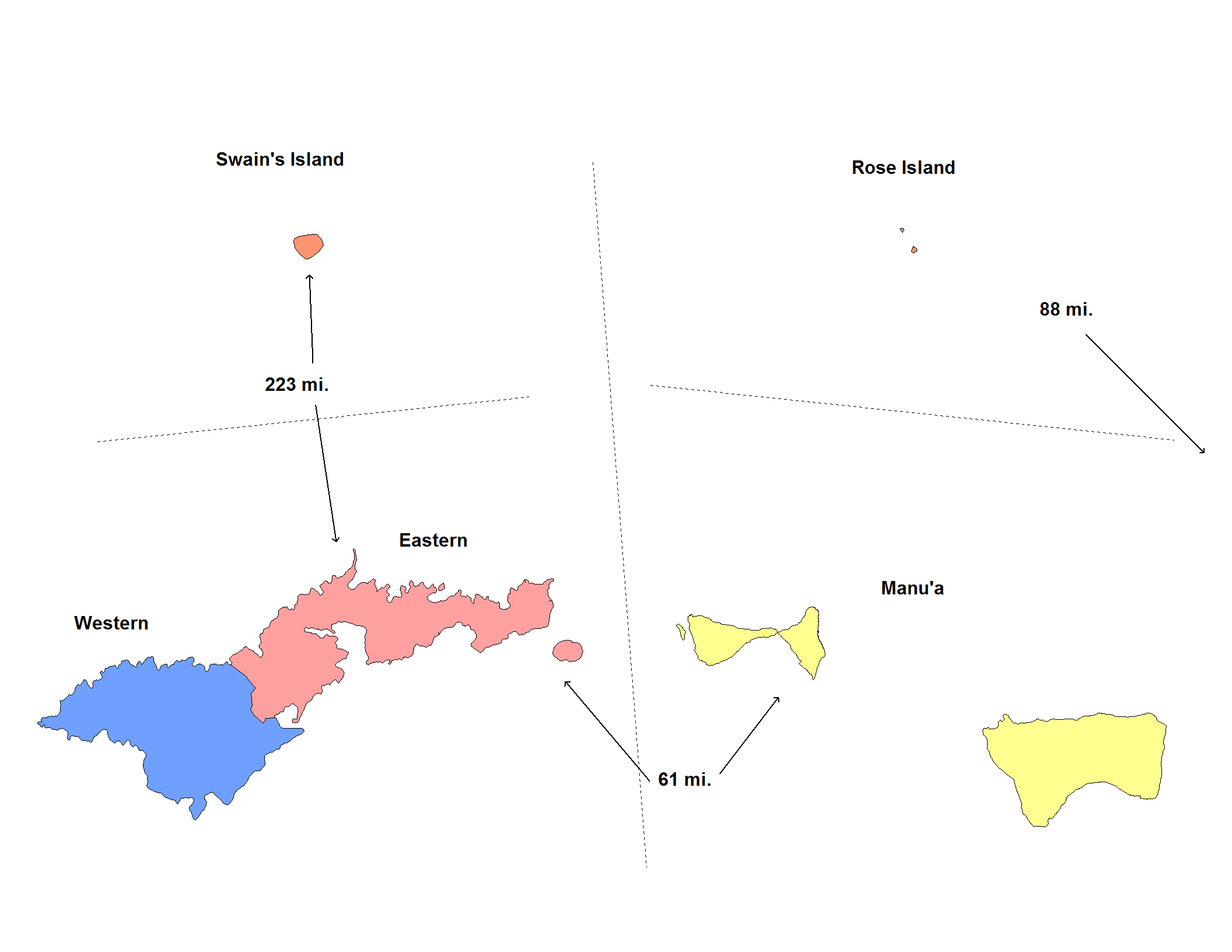
The Manu'a District of American Samoa is shown in yellow.

Manu'a District is further divided into five counties.

- Faleasao County
- Fitiuta County
- Ofu County
- Olosega County
- Taʻū County

== History ==
According to historical Samoan oral tradition, Manu'a was formerly the ruling center of a large Polynesian empire that included the entire Samoan archipelago, as well as other nearby islands, including Tonga and parts of Fiji. The traditional capital of Manuʻa is the village of Taʻū, on the island of Taʻū.

=== The Tui Manu'a ===
The sovereign of Manuʻa was the Tui Manu'a. This title was the progenitor of many of the high titles used in other parts of the Samoan Islands. Manuʻa was the only part of Samoa that was never subjected to Tongan rule, because both the Tongans and the Samoans regarded Manuʻa as having sacred status. The last Tui Manuʻa was Tuimanuʻa Elisara (sometimes written Tui Manuʻa Elisala), who held the title at the beginning of the 20th century. Before he died on July 2, 1909, he expressed the wish that the title die with him. At the time, the U.S. government took the position that Elisara's title had actually changed to “District Governor” nine years before his death, on June 5, 1900, the day that the U.S. flag had been hoisted at Taʻū (Office of the Governor, 2004). However, titles and holdings were not obliterated when the islands became a U.S. territory, and the title and estates of Tuimanuʻa remain in the custody of the Anoalo clan (the male Tuimanuʻa line). So the title Tui Manuʻa technically still exists, although no one is the holder of the title.

=== US Cession ===
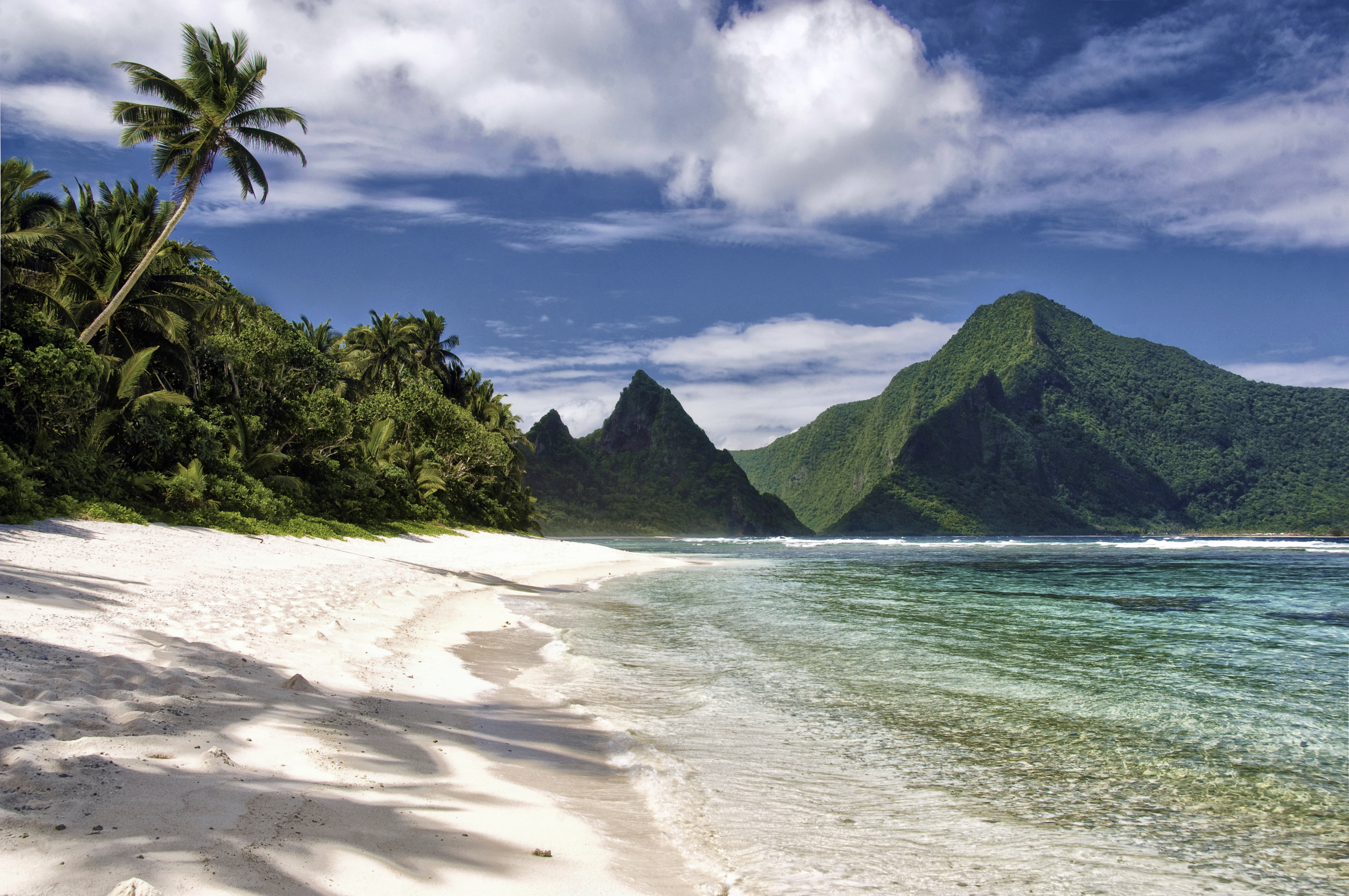
Ofu Beach on Ofu Island

The Tripartite Convention of 1899 partitioned the Samoan Islands, giving the U.S. control of the eastern islands (including Tutuila and the Manuʻa Group), and giving European powers control of the western islands (including ʻUpolu and Savaiʻi).

In 1901, Tutuila's leaders agreed to this arrangement. As a result, Manu'a was eventually forced to accept U.S. rule, and they formalized their acceptance in a Deed of Succession, signed by the Tui Manuʻa (supreme chief of Manuʻa) on July 16, 1904. The signing took place at the Crown residence of the Tuimanuʻa (called the Faleula) in Lalopua (according to official documents of the Tuimanuʻa government (Office of the Governor, 2004). Around this time, as of 1903, Manu'a had a total population of approximately 2,000 residents.

Since that time, the Manuʻa Island Group has officially been part of the US Protectorate of American Samoa.

In 1915, in response to the destruction caused to Manu'a that year by a hurricane, both the U.S. Congress and the American Red Cross sent financial aid to American Samoa for the first time. The hurricane, which hit the islands on January 9, 1915, caused widespread destruction in the Manuʻa Islands. The storm severed all forms of communication with the outside world, isolating the islands. In the aftermath, no vessels on the Manuʻa Islands were capable of making the journey to Tutuila. It took 22 days for the first contact to be reestablished between Tutuila and Manuʻa. This was achieved when Pele Scoles repaired a longboat and rowed from Ofu to Tutuila. The hurricane struck overnight, uprooting an estimated 75% of coconut trees and many breadfruit. The village of Sili was washed away. Fatalities included a drowning in Fitiʻuta, a man on Ofu killed by flying metal, and a woman in Olosega killed by a falling tree. The local radio station was destroyed, and villages and plantations across Manuʻa suffered extensive damage.

== Demographics ==
Historical population
Year	Pop.	±%
1900	1,756	—
1912	1,797	+2.3%
1920	1,871	+4.1%
1930	2,147	+14.8%
1940	2,597	+21.0%
1950	2,819	+8.5%
1960	2,695	−4.4%
1970	2,112	−21.6%
1980	1,732	−18.0%
1990	1,714	−1.0%
2000	1,378	−19.6%
2010	1,143	−17.1%
2020	832	−27.2%
U.S. Decennial Census

Manu'a District was first recorded beginning with the 1900 U.S. Census. No census was taken in 1910, but a special census was taken in 1912. Regular decennial censuses were taken beginning in 1920. Its population zenith was in 1950. As of 2000–10, it had a population lower than when first recorded in 1900.

== Society and culture ==
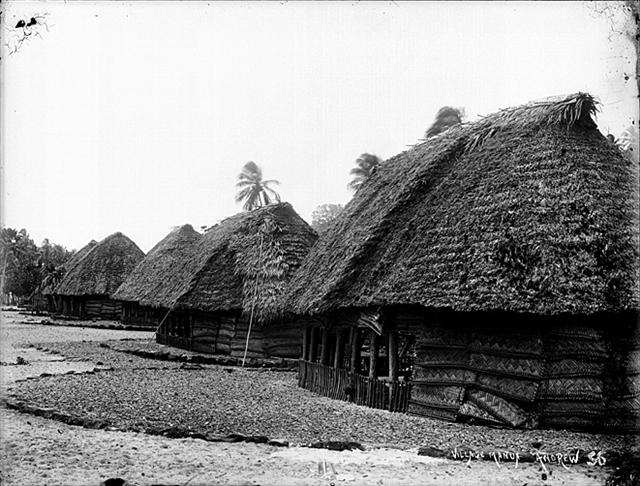
Samoan fale in the Manu'a island group, showing thatched roof and woven pola blinds, circa 1890 - 1910.

The history of Manuʻa is said in Samoan oratory to contain the origins of Samoan and Polynesian culture, and the genealogy of Polynesians east of Samoa is said to have originated in Manuʻa. In traditional belief the sun rises over Samoa at Saua on the island of Taʻū, where the coral reef is supposed to be always yellow from the sun, and it sets at Falealupo the westernmost village on the island of Savaiʻi in Samoa. This journey of the sun is strongly related to traditional beliefs and defines the uniformity of cultural identity across both Samoas. The term Fa'asamoa describes "The Samoan Way", or traditional Samoan way of life

== Economy ==
Today, many families of Manuʻa rely on income from family members working in Tutuila and in the United States. The local diet was generally healthier than in Tutuila, with less reliance on imported tinned foods. However, with the declining population, fewer and fewer locals are fishing and farming, and the dependence on imported food has been exacerbated by the lack of local produce, flailing plantations, and diminishing livestock. A few mom-and-pop stores are open, and some private rental homes contribute to the local economy. Yet, the American Samoa Government (ASG) is the largest employer in the islands, with branch offices of each government department: Agriculture, Education, Department of Health, Public Safety & Fire, Port Administration, American Samoa Power Authority (ASPA), American Samoa Telecommunications Authority (ASTCA), Marine Wildlife Resources, and M&O.

In 2010, the Manuʻa District had a per capita income of $5,441 — this makes the Manuʻa District the county / county-equivalent with the lowest-per capita income in the entire United States.

== Language ==
Traditionally, the people of Manuʻa spoke the Samoan language with a unique "t" sound. The ancient sound was between a light spoken "t" with a puff of air and a gentle "d" sound. By the 1830s, missionaries transcribed the Holy Bible into the native tongue, adding the letters h, k, and r to accommodate the new sounds from the scriptures. The spoken language has since adopted a heavy "k" sound that is usually reserved for non-biblical traditional oratory and everyday conversation.

== Education ==
There are three elementary schools in Manu'a: Faleasao Elementary, Fitiuta Elementary, and 'Olosega Elementary. The high school is on Taʻū Island, called Manuʻa High School, and was designed to serve all of Manuʻa in 1966. Students seeking higher education go to American Samoa Community College on Tutuila Island where the University of Hawaiʻi offers a teachers' college, and several mainline churches offer seminaries. Such as the Kanana Fou Seminary and the Wayland Baptist University. Some students opt to attend the National University of Samoa on ʻUpolu Island, or elsewhere on the US mainland.

== Wildlife ==
The fauna of the Manu'a Islands reflects a balance of indigenous species and human-introduced animals, shaped by millennia of human activity. Vertebrate diversity is most evident among birds, both land and seabirds, which dominate the avian landscape. Indigenous birds such as the Pacific pigeon and the Crimson-crowned fruit dove inhabit the forested highlands, while seabirds like the White-tailed tropicbird nest in cliffs. The Polynesian starling and the Banded rail are also present, the latter often seen darting across open ground. Marine life is significant, with Ofu’s surrounding reef supporting a variety of mollusks, crustaceans, and fish. Edible species such as Periglypta reticulata and Tridacna maxima thrive in the coral ecosystem, while Spiny lobsters and reef fish are regularly harvested. Marine turtles Chelonia mydas and Eretmochelys imbricata are represented in archaeological deposits, indicating historical nesting. Among mammals, the Samoa flying fox is the only native terrestrial species, frequently seen at dusk. Early Polynesian settlers introduced domestic animals such as pigs, dogs, and rats, which left archaeological traces. Invertebrate fauna is particularly rich, especially land snails, which serve as key indicators of environmental change.
