= Index of American Samoa–related articles =

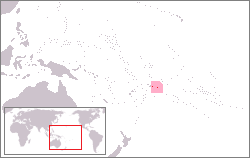
The location of American Samoa in the western South Pacific Ocean

The following is an alphabetical list of articles related to the United States Territory of American Samoa.

== 0–9 ==
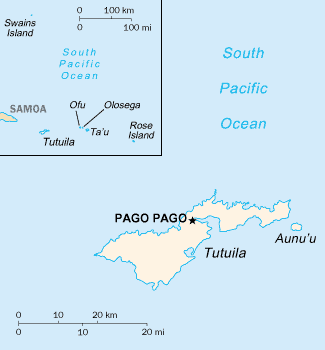
An enlargeable map of the United States Territory of American Samoa

- .as – Internet country code top-level domain for American Samoa

== A ==
- Administrative divisions of American Samoa
- Airports in American Samoa
- American Samoa (website)
  - Category:American Samoa
    - commons:Category:American Samoa
- American Samoa Territorial Police
- AS – United States Postal Service postal code for the Territory of American Samoa
- Atlas of American Samoa
- Aunu‘u Island

== B ==
- Birds of American Samoa

== C ==
- Capital of American Samoa
- Colleges and universities in American Samoa
  - commons:Category:Universities and colleges in American Samoa
- Communications in American Samoa
  - Category:Communications in American Samoa
    - commons:Category:Communications in American Samoa
- Constitution of American Samoa
- Culture of Samoa
  - Category:Culture of American Samoa
    - commons:Category:American Samoan culture
- Cyclones in American Samoa

== D ==
- Demographics of American Samoa

== E ==
- Economy of American Samoa
  - Category:Economy of American Samoa
    - commons:Category:Economy of American Samoa
- Education in American Samoa
  - commons:Category:Education in American Samoa
- Elections in American Samoa
  - Category:Elections in American Samoa
- Electoral reform in American Samoa
- Environment of American Samoa
  - commons:Category:Environment of American Samoa

== F ==
The Flag of American Samoa

- Fa'asamoa
- Fagatogo, American Samoa, capital since 1967
- Flag of American Samoa

== G ==
- Geography of American Samoa
  - Category:Geography of American Samoa
    - commons:Category:Geography of American Samoa
- Geology of American Samoa
- Government of the Territory of American Samoa (website)
  - Category:Government of American Samoa
    - commons:Category:Government of American Samoa
- Governor of the Territory of American Samoa
  - List of governors of American Samoa

== H ==
- Higher education in American Samoa
- History of American Samoa
  - Historical outline of American Samoa
    - Category:History of American Samoa
      - commons:Category:History of American Samoa

== I ==
- Images of American Samoa
- Independent State of Samoa
  - Official protest to the Independent State of Samoa
- Islands of American Samoa
  - Aunu‘u Island
  - Ofu Island
  - Olosega Island
  - Rose Atoll
  - Swains Island
  - Ta‘ū Island
  - Tutuila Island

== L ==
- Languages of American Samoa
- Law enforcement in American Samoa
- Lists related to American Samoa:
  - List of airports in American Samoa
  - List of American Samoa locations by per capita income
  - List of American Samoa territorial symbols
  - List of birds of American Samoa
  - List of cities in American Samoa
  - List of colleges and universities in American Samoa
  - List of Delegates to the United States House of Representatives from American Samoa
  - List of governors of American Samoa
  - List of islands of American Samoa
  - List of mammals of American Samoa
  - List of National Natural Landmarks in American Samoa
  - List of political parties in American Samoa
  - List of radio stations in American Samoa
  - List of Registered Historic Places in American Samoa
  - List of reptiles of American Samoa
  - List of Superfund sites in American Samoa
  - List of the wettest known tropical cyclones in American Samoa

== M ==
- Mammals of American Samoa
- Military in American Samoa
- Mountains of American Samoa
  - commons:Category:Mountains of American Samoa
- Music of American Samoa

== N ==
- National Park of American Samoa

== O ==
- Ofu Island
- Olosega Island

== P ==
- Pacific Basin Development Council
- Pago Pago, American Samoa, capital 1899–1967
- People from American Samoa
- Politics of American Samoa
  - List of political parties in American Samoa
  - Category:Politics of American Samoa
    - commons:Category:Politics of American Samoa
- Protected areas of American Samoa
  - commons:Category:Protected areas of American Samoa

== R ==
- Radio stations in American Samoa
- Registered historic places in American Samoa
  - commons:Category:Registered Historic Places in American Samoa
- Religion in American Samoa
  - commons:Category:Religion in American Samoa
- Reptiles of American Samoa
- Rose Atoll

== S ==
The Seal of American Samoa

- Samoan Islands
- Samoans
- Scouting in American Samoa
- Seal of American Samoa
- Category:Society of American Samoa
  - commons:Category:American Samoan society
- Sports in American Samoa
  - Football Federation American Samoa
  - Category:Sports in American Samoa
    - commons:Category:Sports in American Samoa
- Superfund sites in American Samoa
- Swains Island

== T ==
- Ta‘ū Island
- Telecommunications in American Samoa
  - commons:Category:Communications in American Samoa
- Television stations in American Samoa
- Territory of American Samoa (website)
  - Constitution of American Samoa
  - Government of American Samoa
    - Category:Government of American Samoa
      - commons:Category:Government of American Samoa
  - Administrative divisions of American Samoa
  - List of governors of American Samoa
- Tokelau
  - Territorial claim by Tokelau nationalists
- Tourism in American Samoa (website)
  - commons:Category:Tourism in American Samoa
- Transportation in American Samoa
- Tutuila Island

== U ==
- United States of America
  - List of Delegates to the United States House of Representatives from American Samoa
  - Political divisions of the United States
  - United States Court of Appeals for the Ninth Circuit
  - American Samoa's at-large congressional district
- Universities and colleges in American Samoa
  - commons:Category:Universities and colleges in American Samoa

== W ==
- Wikimedia
  - Wikimedia Commons Atlas of American Samoa
  - Wikimedia Commons Category:American Samoa
    - commons:Category:Maps of American Samoa
  - Wikinews:Category:American Samoa
    - Wikinews:Portal:American Samoa
  - Wikipedia Category:American Samoa
    - Wikipedia:WikiProject American Samoa
      - Wikipedia:WikiProject American Samoa#Recognized content
      - Wikipedia:WikiProject American Samoa#Participants
    - Wikipedia:WikiProject Lists of basic topics/Draft/List of basic American Samoa topics

== See also ==
- Topic overview:
  - American Samoa
  - Outline of American Samoa
  - Bibliography of American Samoa
