= Outline of American Samoa =

Unincorporated territory of the U.S., in the South Pacific

The Flag of American Samoa

The Seal of American Samoa

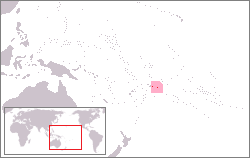
The location of American Samoa

The following outline is provided as an overview of and topical guide to American Samoa:

American Samoa – unincorporated territory located in the South Pacific Ocean southeast of the Independent State of Samoa. The main (largest and most populous) island is Tutuila, with the Manuʻa Islands, Rose Atoll, and Swains Island also included in the territory. American Samoa is part of the Samoan Islands chain, located west of the Cook Islands, north of Tonga, and some 300 miles (500 km) south of Tokelau.

== General reference ==
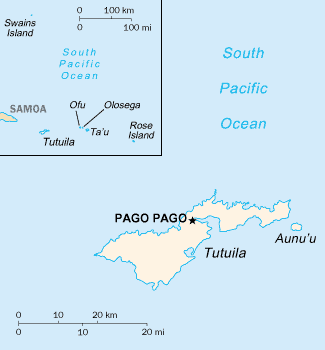
An enlargeable basic map of American Samoa

- Pronunciation:
- Common English country name: American Samoa
- Official English country name: The United States Territory of American Samoa
- Common endonym(s):
- Official endonym(s):
- Adjectival(s): American Samoan, Samoan
- Demonym(s):
- ISO country codes: AS, ASM, 016
- ISO region codes: See ISO 3166-2:AS
- Internet country code top-level domain: .as
- Bibliography of American Samoa

== Geography of American Samoa ==
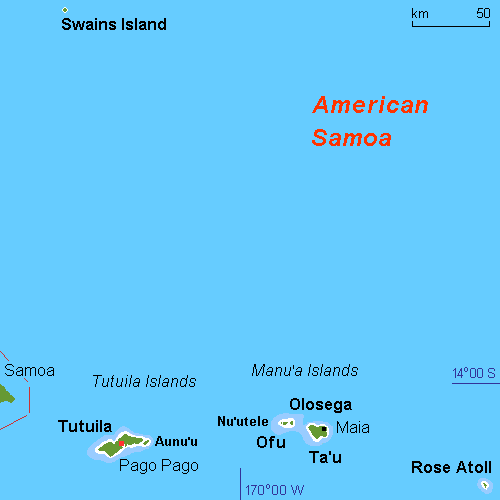
A map of the United States Territory of American Samoa

Geography of American Samoa

- The American Samoa is: a Territory of the United States, consisting of a group of islands
- Location:
  - Western Hemisphere and Southern Hemisphere
  - Pacific Ocean
    - South Pacific Ocean
      - Oceania
        - Polynesia
  - Time zone: Samoa Standard Time (UTC-11)
  - Extreme points of American Samoa
    - High: Lata Mountain 966 m (3,169 ft)
    - Low: South Pacific Ocean 0 m
  - Land boundaries: none
  - Coastline: 116 km
- Population of WikiProject Topic outline/Drafts/Topic outline of American Samoa: 68,200 (2007) - 196th most populous country
- Area of WikiProject Topic outline/Drafts/Topic outline of American Samoa: 199 square kilometres (77 sq mi) - 212th largest country
- Atlas of American Samoa

=== Environment of American Samoa ===
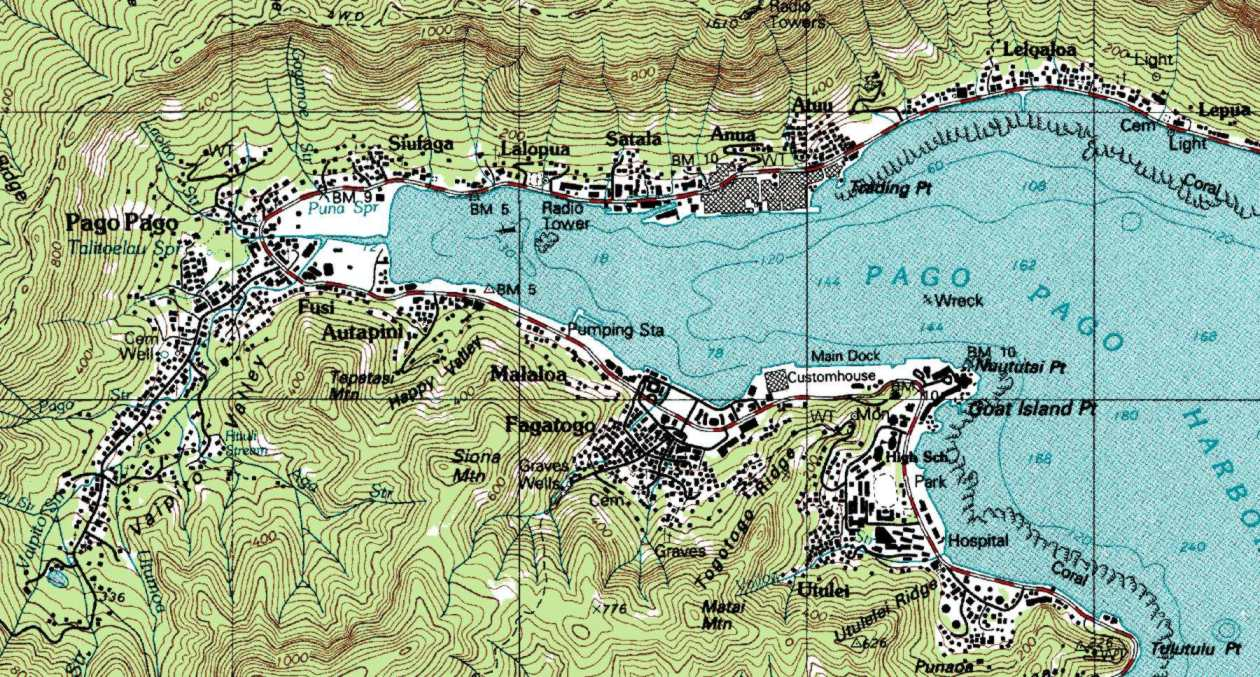
An enlargeable topographic map of Pago Pago Harbor on Tutuila in American Samoa

- Superfund sites in American Samoa
- Wildlife of American Samoa
  - Fauna of American Samoa
    - Birds of American Samoa
    - Mammals of American Samoa

==== Natural geographic features of American Samoa ====
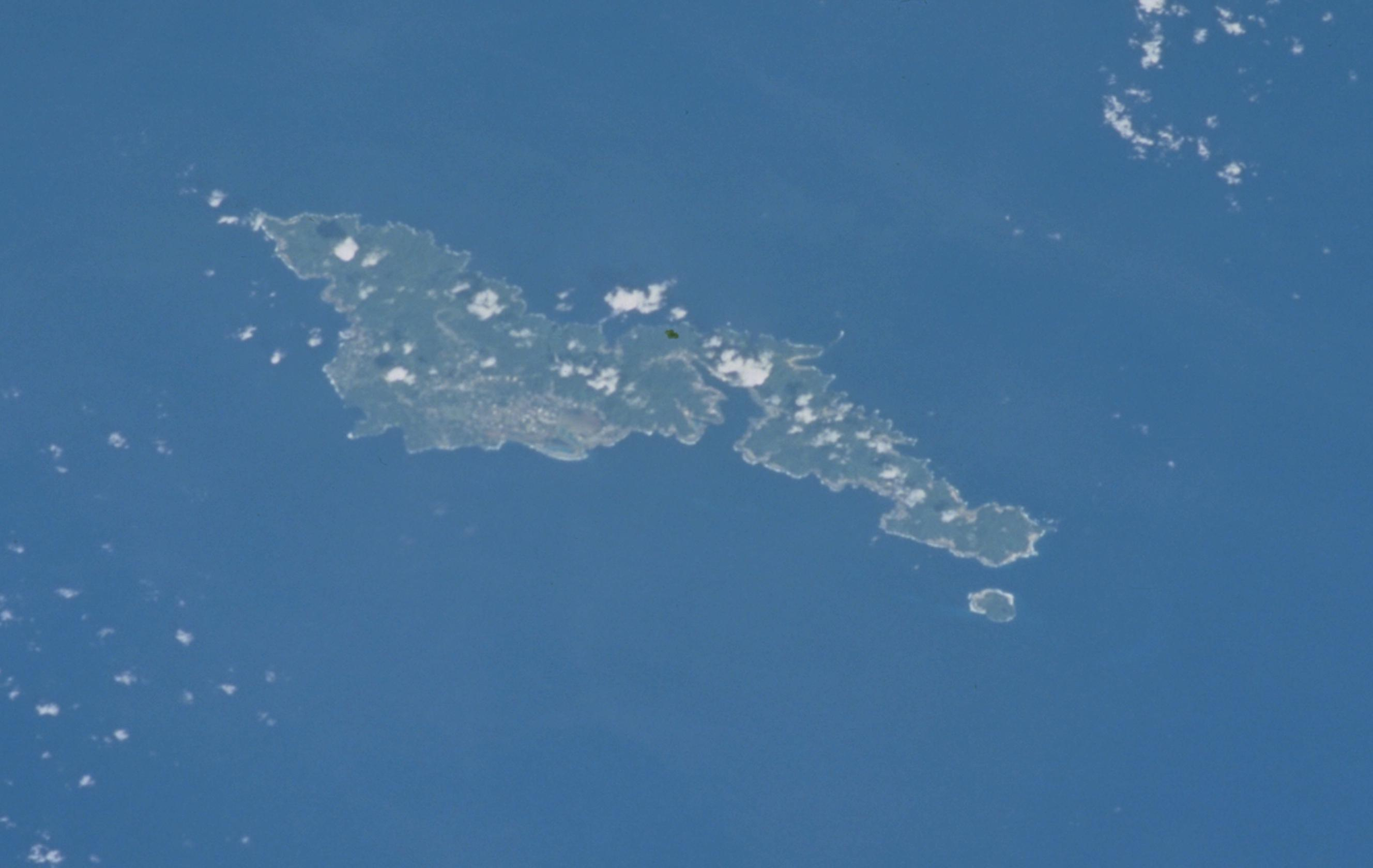
A satellite image of Tutuila and Aunu'u in American Samoa

- Islands of American Samoa
  - Tutuila
  - Aunu'u
  - Ta'ū
  - Ofu‑Olosega
  - Rose Atoll
  - Swains Island
- Rivers of American Samoa
- Swamps of American Samoa
- World Heritage Sites in American Samoa: None

=== Regions of American Samoa ===
==== Administrative divisions of American Samoa ====
Administrative divisions of American Samoa

- Districts of American Samoa
  - Counties of American Samoa
    - Villages of American Samoa

===== Districts of American Samoa =====
- Eastern
- Western
- Manu'a

===== Counties of American Samoa =====
By District

- Eastern
  - Ituau County
  - Ma'Oputasi County
  - Sa'Ole County
  - Sua County
  - Vaifanua County
- Western
  - Lealataua County
  - Leasina County
  - Tualatai County
  - Tualauta County
- Manu'a
  - Faleasao County
  - Fitiuta County
  - Ofu County
  - Olosega County
  - Ta'u County

===== Villages of American Samoa =====
Villages of American Samoa

- Capital of American Samoa: Pago Pago
- Villages of American Samoa
- Aasu
- Afao
- Afono
- Agugulu
- Alao
- Alega
- Alofau
- Amaluia
- Amanave
- Amaua
- Amouli
- Anua
- ʻAoa
- Aoloau
- Asili
- Atu'u
- Aua
- Auasi
- Aumi
- Aunu'u
- Auto
- Avaio
- Faga'alu
- Faga'itua
- Fagali'i
- Fagamalo
- Faganeanea
- Fagasa
- Fagatogo
- Failolo
- Faleasao
- Faleniu
- Fatumafuti
- Futiga
- Ili'ili
- Lauli'i
- Leloaloa
- Leone
- Leusoali'i
- Luma
- Maia
- Malaeimi
- Malaeloa/Aitulagi
- Malaeloa/Ituau
- Maloata
- Mapusagafou
- Masausi
- Masefau
- Matu'u
- Mesepa
- Nuʻuuli
- Nua
- Ofu
- Olosega
- Onenoa
- Pagai
- Pago Pago
- Pava'ia'i
- Poloa
- Rose Atoll
- Sa'ilele
- Se'etaga
- Si'ufaga
- Sili
- Taulaga
- Tafuna
- Taputimu
- Tula
- Utulei
- Utumea East
- Utumea West
- Vailoatai
- Vaitogi
- Vatia

=== Demography of American Samoa ===
Demographics of American Samoa

== Government and politics of American Samoa ==
Politics of American Samoa

- Form of government: A presidential representative democracy that is a self-governing dependency of the United States
- Capital of American Samoa: Pago Pago official
- Elections in American Samoa
- Political parties in American Samoa

=== Branches of government ===
Government of American Samoa

==== Executive branch of the government of American Samoa ====
- Head of state: President of the United States
- Head of government: Governor of American Samoa
- Cabinet of American Samoa

==== Legislative branch of the government of American Samoa ====
- American Samoa Fono (bicameral and nonpartisan)
  - Upper house: American Samoa Senate
  - Lower house: American Samoa House of Representatives

==== Judicial branch of the government of American Samoa ====
Judiciary of American Samoa

- High Court of American Samoa

==== International organization membership ====
The United States Territory of American Samoa is a member of:

- International Criminal Police Organization (Interpol) (subbureau)
- International Olympic Committee (IOC)
- Secretariat of the Pacific Community (SPC)
- Universal Postal Union (UPU)

=== Law and order in American Samoa ===
- Cannabis in American Samoa
- Constitution of American Samoa
- Human rights in American Samoa
  - LGBT rights in American Samoa
  - Freedom of religion in American Samoa
- Law enforcement in American Samoa

=== Military of American Samoa ===
Military of American Samoa

== History of American Samoa ==
History of American Samoa

=== History of American Samoa, by period ===
- Polynesians settle Samoan archipelago about 1000 BCE
  - Samoans
    - Fa'asamoa
    - Fa'amatai
      - Fono
- European and American contact, 1722–1899
  - Jacob Roggeveen, 1722
  - Louis-Antoine de Bougainville, 1768
  - Jean-François de Galaup, comte de La Pérouse, 1787
  - John Williams, 1830–1839
- United States Territory of American Samoa, since December 2, 1899
  - Anglo-German Samoa Convention, November 14, 1899
  - Division of the Samoan archipelago, December 2, 1899
  - Constitution of American Samoa of July 1, 1967
  - National Park of American Samoa established on October 31, 1988

== Culture of American Samoa ==
Culture of American Samoa

- Languages of American Samoa
- List of American Samoa territorial symbols
  - Coat of arms of American Samoa
  - Flag of American Samoa
  - National anthem of American Samoa
- People of American Samoa
- Religion in American Samoa
  - Islam in American Samoa
- World Heritage Sites in American Samoa: None

=== Art in American Samoa ===
- Music of American Samoa

=== Sports in American Samoa ===
Sports in American Samoa

- Soccer in American Samoa
- American Samoa at the Olympics

== Economy and infrastructure of American Samoa ==
Economy of American Samoa

- Economic rank, by nominal GDP (2007): 182nd (one hundred and eight second)
- Communications in American Samoa
  - Internet in American Samoa
- Currency of American Samoa: Dollar
  - ISO 4217: USD
- Transportation in American Samoa
  - Airports in American Samoa

== See also ==
- Topic overview:
  - American Samoa
  - Index of American Samoa-related articles
  - Bibliography of American Samoa
