= American Samoa at the 2017 World Aquatics Championships =

- Flag of American Samoa
- World Aquatics code: ASA
- National federation: American Samoa Swimming Association

in Budapest, Hungary
- Competitors: 1 in 1 sport
- Medals: Gold 0 Silver 0 Bronze 0 Total 0

World Aquatics Championships appearances
- 1998; 2001–2005; 2007; 2009; 2011; 2013; 2015; 2017; 2019; 2022; 2023; 2024; 2025

American Samoa competed at the 2017 World Aquatics Championships in Budapest, Hungary from 14 July to 30 July.

== Swimming ==
American Samoa has received a Universality invitation from FINA to send a female swimmer to the World Championships.

Athlete	Event	Heat		Semifinal		Final	
Athlete	Event	Time	Rank	Time	Rank	Time	Rank
Tilali Scanlan	Women's 100 m breaststroke	1:23.03 NR	51	did not advance			
Tilali Scanlan	Women's 200 m breaststroke	3:04.65	36	did not advance			
