= American Samoa at the 2011 World Aquatics Championships =

- Flag of American Samoa
- World Aquatics code: ASA
- National federation: American Samoa Swimming Association

in Shanghai, China
- Competitors: 3 in 1 sport
- Medals: Gold 0 Silver 0 Bronze 0 Total 0

World Aquatics Championships appearances
- 1998; 2001–2005; 2007; 2009; 2011; 2013; 2015; 2017; 2019; 2022; 2023; 2024; 2025

American Samoa competed at the 2011 World Aquatics Championships in Shanghai, China between July 16 and 31, 2011.

== Swimming ==
American Samoa qualified 3 swimmers.

Men

Athlete	Event	Heats		Semifinals		Final	
Athlete	Event	Time	Rank	Time	Rank	Time	Rank
Wei Ching Maou	Men's 50m Freestyle	27.73	92	did not advance			
Wei Ching Maou	Men's 50m Butterfly	31.29	53	did not advance			

Women

Athlete	Event	Heats		Semifinals		Final	
Athlete	Event	Time	Rank	Time	Rank	Time	Rank
Megan Fonteno	Women's 50m Freestyle	26.46	35	did not advance			
Megan Fonteno	Women's 100m Freestyle	57.85	43	did not advance			
Loreen Whitfield	Women's 100m Butterfly	1:04.82	41	did not advance			
Loreen Whitfield	Women's 200m IM	2:31.97	37	did not advance			
