= American Samoa at the 2023 World Aquatics Championships =

- Flag of American Samoa
- World Aquatics code: ASA
- National federation: American Samoa Swimming Association
- Website: oceaniasport.com/asswimming

in Fukuoka, Japan
- Competitors: 1 in 1 sport
- Medals: Gold 0 Silver 0 Bronze 0 Total 0

World Aquatics Championships appearances
- 1998; 2001–2005; 2007; 2009; 2011; 2013; 2015; 2017; 2019; 2022; 2023; 2024; 2025

American Samoa competed at the 2023 World Aquatics Championships in Fukuoka, Japan from 14 to 30 July.

== Swimming ==
American Samoa entered 1 swimmer.

Men

Athlete	Event	Heat		Semifinal		Final	
Athlete	Event	Time	Rank	Time	Rank	Time	Rank
Micah Masei	50 metre freestyle	24.16	71	Did not advance			
Micah Masei	100 metre breaststroke	1:08.42	63	Did not advance			
