= American Samoa at the 2019 World Aquatics Championships =

- Flag of American Samoa
- World Aquatics code: ASA
- National federation: American Samoa Swimming Association

in Gwangju, South Korea
- Competitors: 2 in 1 sport
- Medals: Gold 0 Silver 0 Bronze 0 Total 0

World Aquatics Championships appearances
- 1998; 2001–2005; 2007; 2009; 2011; 2013; 2015; 2017; 2019; 2022; 2023; 2024; 2025

American Samoa competed at the 2019 World Aquatics Championships in Gwangju, South Korea from 12 to 28 July.

== Swimming ==
American Samoa entered two swimmers.

Men

Athlete	Event	Heat		Semifinal		Final	
Athlete	Event	Time	Rank	Time	Rank	Time	Rank
Micah Masei	50 m freestyle	24.05	73	did not advance			
Micah Masei	100 m breaststroke	1:05.24	67	did not advance			

Women

Athlete	Event	Heat		Semifinal		Final	
Athlete	Event	Time	Rank	Time	Rank	Time	Rank
Tilali Scanlan	100 m breaststroke	1:16.03	45	did not advance			
Tilali Scanlan	200 m breaststroke	2:52.56	32	did not advance			
