= American Samoa at the 2013 World Aquatics Championships =

- Flag of American Samoa
- World Aquatics code: ASA
- National federation: American Samoa Swimming Association

in Barcelona, Spain
- Medals: Gold 0 Silver 0 Bronze 0 Total 0

World Aquatics Championships appearances
- 1998; 2001–2005; 2007; 2009; 2011; 2013; 2015; 2017; 2019; 2022; 2023; 2024; 2025

American Samoa competed at the 2013 World Aquatics Championships in Barcelona, Spain from 19 July to 4 August 2013.

== Swimming ==
American Samoan swimmers achieved qualifying standards in the following events (up to a maximum of 2 swimmers in each event at the A-standard entry time, and 1 at the B-standard):

Women

Athlete	Event	Heat		Semifinal		Final	
Athlete	Event	Time	Rank	Time	Rank	Time	Rank
Loreen Whitfield	100 m butterfly	1:02.50	36	did not advance			
Loreen Whitfield	200 m individual medley	2:28.05	41	did not advance			
