= List of American Samoa territorial symbols =

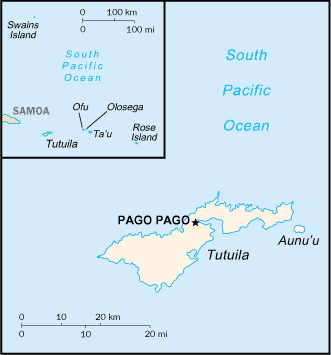
Map of American Samoa

This is a list of American Samoa territorial symbols:

Type	Symbol	Year	Image
Flag	The Flag of American Samoa	April 27, 1960	
Seal	The Seal of American Samoa	1973	
Motto	Samoan: "Samoa — Muamua Le Atua"; English: "Samoa — let God be first"	1973	
Nickname	Motu o Fiafiaga (a Samoan phrase; in English, it is "Islands of Paradise")		
Song	Amerika Samoa	1950	
Flower	Paogo (Ulafala); Pandanus tectorius	1973	
Plant	ʻAva (Kava)	1973	
Quarter	Quarter of American Samoa	2009	
License Plate	License Plate of American Samoa (current 2011 version features Fatu Rock)	2011	

American Samoa main highway sign

== Other symbols ==
- The fue, To'oto'o (staff) and Tanoa (kava bowl), featured on the Seal of American Samoa and on the American Samoa quarter
- Fatu Rock
- Samoa 'ava ceremony

== See also ==
- Governors of American Samoa
