= American Samoa at the 2024 World Aquatics Championships =

- Flag of American Samoa
- FINA code: ASA
- National federation: American Samoa Swimming Association
- Website: oceaniasport.com/asswimming

in Doha, Qatar
- Competitors: 1 in 1 sport

World Aquatics Championships appearances
- 1998; 2001–2005; 2007; 2009; 2011; 2013; 2015; 2017; 2019; 2022; 2023; 2024

American Samoa competed at the 2024 World Aquatics Championships in Doha, Qatar from 2 to 18 February.

== Swimming ==
American Samoa entered 1 swimmer.

Men

Athlete	Event	Heat		Semifinal		Final	
Athlete	Event	Time	Rank	Time	Rank	Time	Rank
Micah Masei	50 metre freestyle	24.00	61	Did not advance			
Micah Masei	100 metre breaststroke	Did not start		Did not advance			
