= Bibliography of American Samoa =

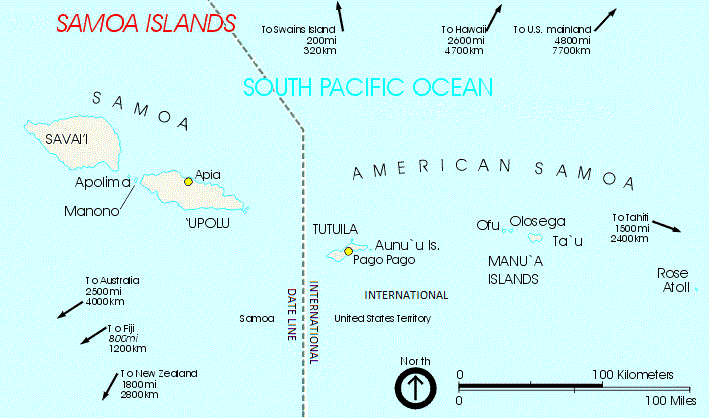
Samoa Islands 14°20′00″S 170°00′00″W

This is an English language bibliography of American Samoa and its geography, history, inhabitants, culture, biota, etc.

American Samoa (/əˈmɛrɪkən səˈmoʊ.ə/; Samoan: Amerika Sāmoa; also Amelika Sāmoa or Sāmoa Amelika) is an unincorporated territory of the United States located in the South Pacific Ocean, southeast of the sovereign state of Samoa (formerly known as Western Samoa).

== History ==
- American Samoa: A General Report by the Governor (Report). U.S. Government Printing Office. 1913–1922. - published annually.
- Gray, Captain J. A. C. (1960). Amerika Samoa: A History of American Samoa and Its United States Naval Administration. Naval Institute Press.

== Military histories ==
- Friedman, Hal M. (2007). Governing the American Lake: The U.S. Defense and Administration of the Pacific Basin, 1945-1947. Ann Arbor, MI: Michigan State University Press. ISBN 978-0-87013-794-5.

== Natural histories ==
- Amerson, A. Binion Jr.; W. Arthur Whistler; Terry D. Schwaner; Richard C. Banks (1982). Wildlife and Wildlife Habitat of American Samoa. Washington, D.C.: U.S. Department of the Interior Fish and Wildlife Service.
- Setchell, William Albert – American Samoa: Part I: Vegetation of Tutuila Island. Part II. Ethnobotany of the Samoans. Part III. Vegetation of Rose Atoll.
- Ramalingam, Shivaji (1976). "An annotated checklist and keys to the mosquitoes of Samoa and Tonga" (PDF). Mosquito Systematics. 8 (3). Walter Reed Army Institute of Research: 298–318.

== Political and social histories ==
- Caton, Hiram (1990). The Samoa Reader: Anthropologists Take Stock. University Press of America. ISBN 978-0-8191-7720-9.
- Coulter, John Wesley - Land Utilization in American Samoa.
- Emerson, Rupert, Lawrence S. Finkelstein, E. L. Bartlett, George H. McLane, and Roy E. James - America's Pacific Dependencies: A Survey of American Colonial Policies and of Administration and Progress toward Self-Rule in Alaska, Hawaii, Guam, Samoa, and the Trust Territory.
- Freeman, Derek - The Fateful Hoaxing of Margaret Mead: A Historical Analysis of Her Samoan Research.
- Freeman, Derek - Margaret Mead and Samoa: The Making and Unmaking of an Anthropological Myth.
- Gilbert, Sandra M. - Wrongful Death: A Medical Tragedy.
- Kirch, P. V. and T. L. Hunt - The To'aga Site: three millennia of Polynesian occupation in the Manu'a Islands, American Samoa.
- Mead, Margaret (1963). Coming of Age in Samoa: A Study of Adolescence and Sex in primitive society. Mentor-New American Library.
- Schramm, Wilbur, Lyle M. Nelson, and Mere T. Betham – Bold Experiment: The Story of Educational Television in American Samoa.
- Sinavaiana-Gabbard, Caroline – Alchemies of Distance.
- West, Francis J. - Political Advancement in the South Pacific: A Comparative Study of Colonial Practice in Fiji, Tahiti and American Samoa.

== Fiction ==
- Daley, Kevin (2009). South Pacific Survivor. NovelsPlus. ISBN 978-0-615-31722-9.

== Bibliographies ==
- Hughes, H. G. A. (1996). Samoa: (American Samoa, Western Samoa, Samoans Abroad) (World Bibliographical Series #196). ABC-CLIO. ISBN 978-1-85109-253-6.

== See also ==
- Topic overview:
  - American Samoa
  - Outline of American Samoa
  - Index of American Samoa-related articles
