= American Samoan =

American Samoan may refer to:

- Something of, or related to American Samoa
- A person from American Samoa, or of American Samoan descent. For information about the American Samoan people, see Demographics of American Samoa, Samoans, and Culture of Samoa. For specific American Samoans, see List of people from American Samoa.
- Note that there is no language called "American Samoan". Languages spoken in American Samoa include American English and the Samoan language.

== See also ==
- Samoan Americans
