= Pacific Basin Development Council =

The Pacific Basin Development Council is a non-profit organization that was established in early 1980s by the governors of the Northern Mariana Islands, American Samoa, Guam, and Hawaii. The Council is concerned with the economic and social development of the Pacific Islands, and conducts research and implements projects to that end. The Pacific Basin Development Council is managed by a board of directors.

== Withdrawal of Hawaii ==
In 1996, Governor Ben Cayetano withdrew Hawaii from the Pacific Basin Development Council as part of state budget cuts. At that time, each of the four members of the Council paid annual dues of $63,000.

== Sources ==
- Pacific Islands Institutions
- "Hawaii pulls out of Pacific Basin Council"
