= Swamps of American Samoa =

This is a list of swamps in American Samoa, categorized by island.

There are four marshes on the island of Tutuila:

- Faimulivai Marsh: This freshwater marsh in Aunu'u Crater is the largest such wetland in American Samoa. It was formed from drainage of the low-lying crater. It is part of a protected National Natural Landmark on Aunu'u which was designated in 1972. The Pacific black duck was seen in the marsh in 1976, but it may now be extinct in the region; another significant local bird is the purple swamphen. This marsh is the only place in American Samoa that has Chinese water chestnut.
- Lalopapa Marsh
- Palapalaloa Marsh
- Taufusi Marsh

There are two marshes on the island of Manua:

- Ta`ü Marsh
- Vaoto Marsh: This feature on Ofu was likely not significantly affected by construction of a nearby airport.

== See also ==
- Geography of American Samoa
