= List of birds of American Samoa =

This is a list of the bird species recorded in American Samoa. The avifauna of American Samoa include a total of 76 species as of 2023, according to Bird Checklists of the World. Of them, 15 are rare or accidental, four have been introduced by humans, and one, the mao, is extirpated. American Samoa has no endemic bird species but several near-endemics occur and many of the land birds occur in good numbers. A variety of seabirds breed in the islands. Hunting and introduced predators have reduced their numbers but there are still some important breeding sites such as Lata Mountain on Ta'u Island.

This list's taxonomic treatment (designation and sequence of orders, families and species) and nomenclature (English and scientific names) are those of The Clements Checklist of Birds of the World, 2022 edition.

The following tags have been used to highlight several categories of occurrence.

- (A) Accidental - a species that rarely or accidentally occurs in American Samoa
- (I) Introduced - a species introduced to American Samoa as a consequence, direct or indirect, of human actions
- (Ex) Extirpated - a species that no longer occurs in American Samoa although populations exist elsewhere

== Ducks, geese, and waterfowl ==
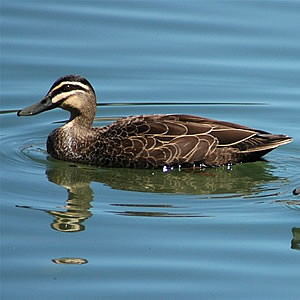
Pacific black duck or tolo'a, resident in small numbers

Order: Anseriformes Family: Anatidae

Anatidae includes the ducks and most duck-like waterfowl, such as geese and swans. These birds are adapted to an aquatic existence with webbed feet, flattened bills, and feathers that are excellent at shedding water due to an oily coating.

- Northern shoveler, Spatula clypeata (A)
- Pacific black duck, Anas superciliosa
- Eastern spot-billed duck, Anas zonorhyncha

== Pheasants, grouse, and allies ==
Order: Galliformes Family: Phasianidae

The Phasianidae are a family of terrestrial birds which consists of quails, partridges, snowcocks, francolins, spurfowls, tragopans, monals, pheasants, peafowls, and jungle fowls. In general, they are plump (although they vary in size) and have broad, relatively short wings.

- Red junglefowl, Gallus gallus (I)

== Pigeons and doves ==
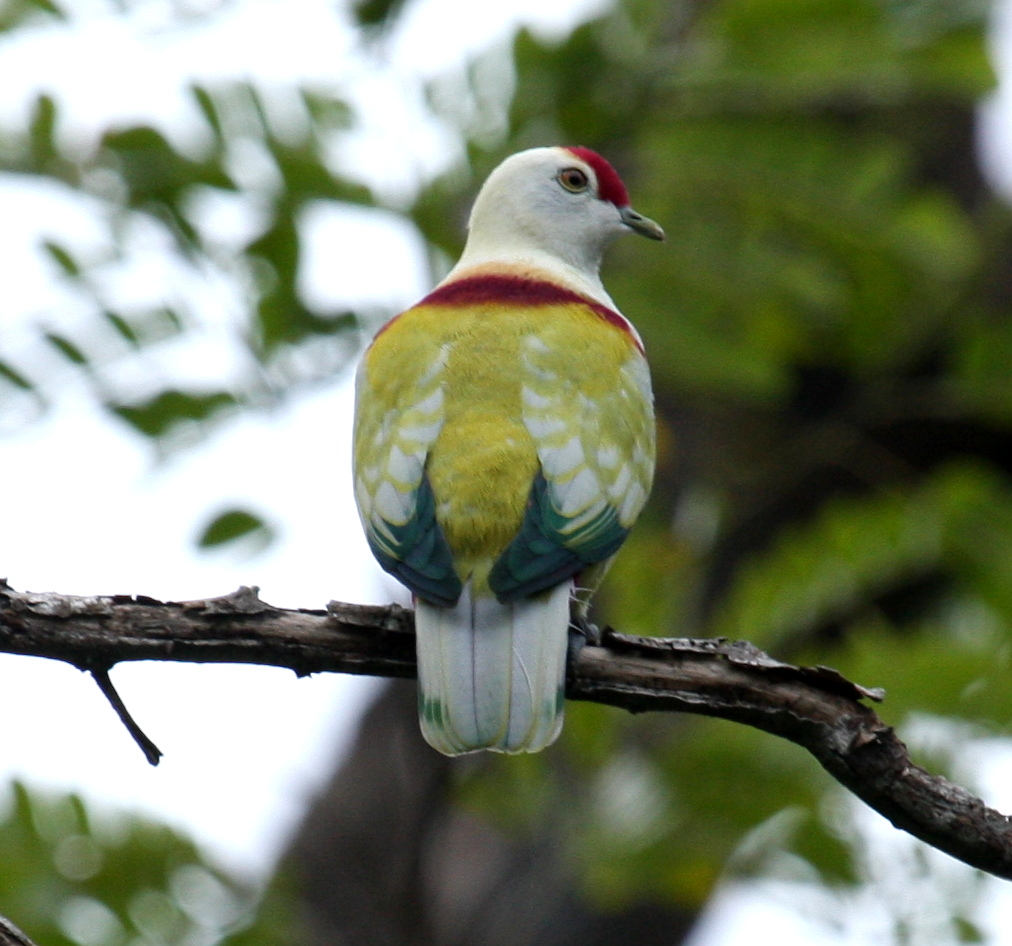
Many-colored fruit-dove or manuma, rare and threatened by hunting

Order: Columbiformes Family: Columbidae

Pigeons and doves are stout-bodied birds with short necks and short slender bills with a fleshy cere.

- Rock pigeon, Columba livia (A)
- Shy ground dove, Alopecoenas stairi
- Many-colored fruit-dove, Ptilinopus perousii
- Crimson-crowned fruit-dove, Ptilinopus porphyraceus
- Pacific imperial-pigeon, Ducula pacifica

== Cuckoos ==
Order: Cuculiformes Family: Cuculidae

The family Cuculidae includes cuckoos, roadrunners, and anis. These birds are of variable size with slender bodies, long tails, and strong legs. The Old World cuckoos are brood parasites.

- Long-tailed koel, Urodynamis taitensis

== Swifts ==
Order: Caprimulgiformes Family: Apodidae

Swifts are small birds which spend the majority of their lives flying. These birds have very short legs and never settle voluntarily on the ground, perching instead only on vertical surfaces. Many swifts have long swept-back wings which resemble a crescent or boomerang.

- White-rumped swiftlet, Aerodramus spodiopygius
- Australian swiftlet, Aerodramus terraereginae

== Rails, gallinules, and coots ==
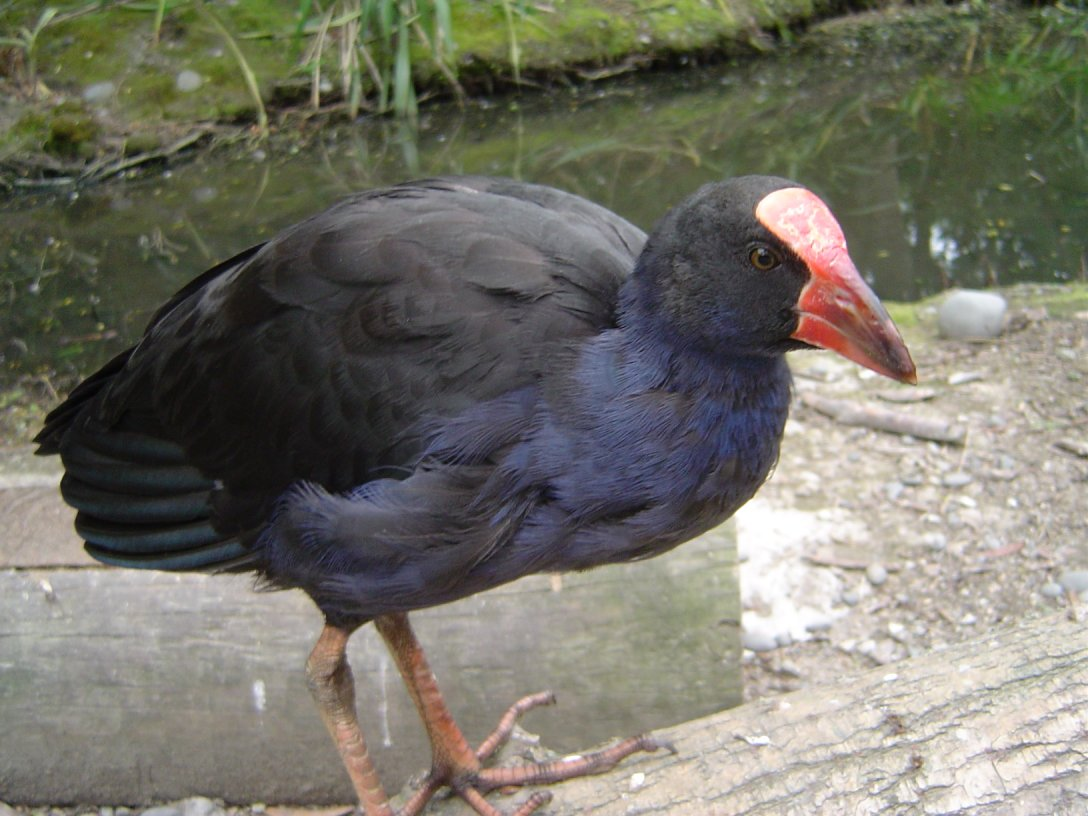
Australasian swamphen or manuali'i, widespread in thick cover

Order: Gruiformes Family: Rallidae

Rallidae is a large family of small to medium-sized birds which includes the rails, crakes, coots, and gallinules. Typically they inhabit dense vegetation in damp environments near lakes, swamps, or rivers. In general they are shy and secretive birds, making them difficult to observe. Most species have strong legs and long toes which are well adapted to soft uneven surfaces. They tend to have short, rounded wings and to be weak fliers.

- Buff-banded rail, Gallirallus philippensis
- Black-backed swamphen, Porphyrio indicus
- Australasian swamphen, Porphyrio melanotus
- Spotless crake, Zapornia tabuensis

== Plovers and lapwings ==
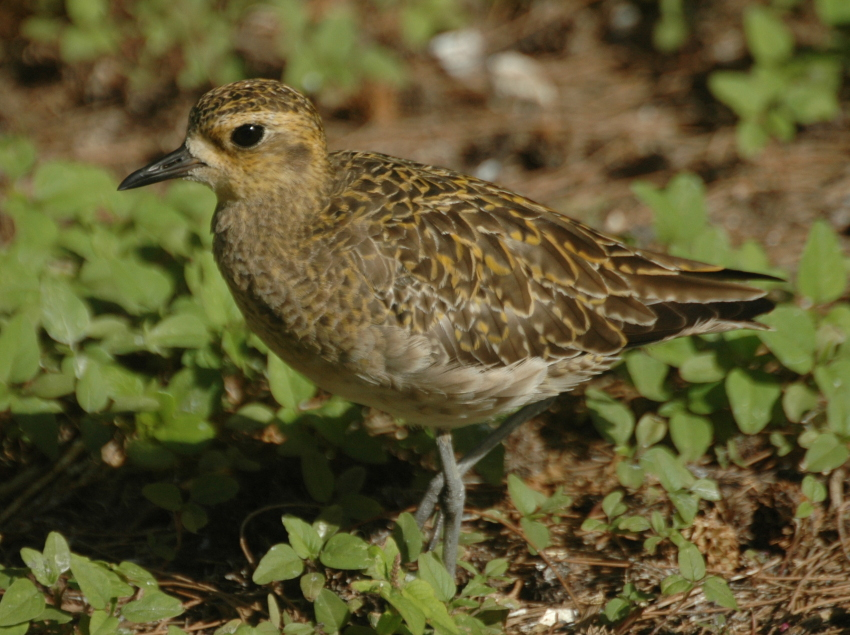
Pacific golden-plover or tulī, a migrant seen on coasts and grassy areas

Order: Charadriiformes Family: Charadriidae

The family Charadriidae includes the plovers, dotterels, and lapwings. They are small to medium-sized birds with compact bodies, short thick necks, and long, usually pointed, wings. They are found in open country worldwide, mostly in habitats near water.

- Pacific golden-plover, Pluvialis fulva
- Masked lapwing, Vanellus miles (A)

== Sandpipers and allies ==
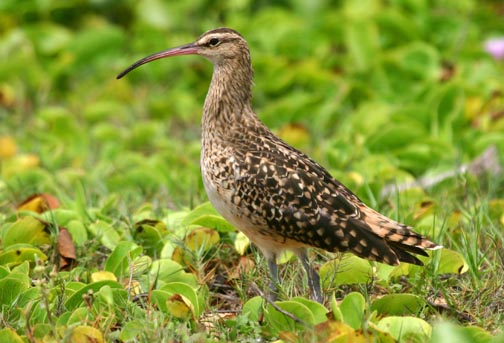
Bristle-thighed curlew or tuli'olovalu, a migrant in small numbers from Alaska

Order: Charadriiformes Family: Scolopacidae

Scolopacidae is a large diverse family of small to medium-sized shorebirds including the sandpipers, curlews, godwits, shanks, tattlers, woodcocks, snipes, dowitchers, and phalaropes. The majority of these species eat small invertebrates picked out of the mud or soil. Variation in length of legs and bills enables multiple species to feed in the same habitat, particularly on the coast, without direct competition for food.

- Bristle-thighed curlew, Numenius tahitiensis
- Whimbrel, Numenius phaeopus (A)
- Bar-tailed godwit, Limosa lapponica
- Ruddy turnstone, Arenaria interpres
- Sanderling, Calidris alba
- Wandering tattler, Tringa incana

== Skuas and jaegers ==
Order: Charadriiformes Family: Stercorariidae

The family Stercorariidae are, in general, medium to large birds, typically with grey or brown plumage, often with white markings on the wings. They nest on the ground in temperate and arctic regions and are long-distance migrants.

- Parasitic jaeger, Stercorarius parasiticus (A)

== Gulls, terns, and skimmers ==
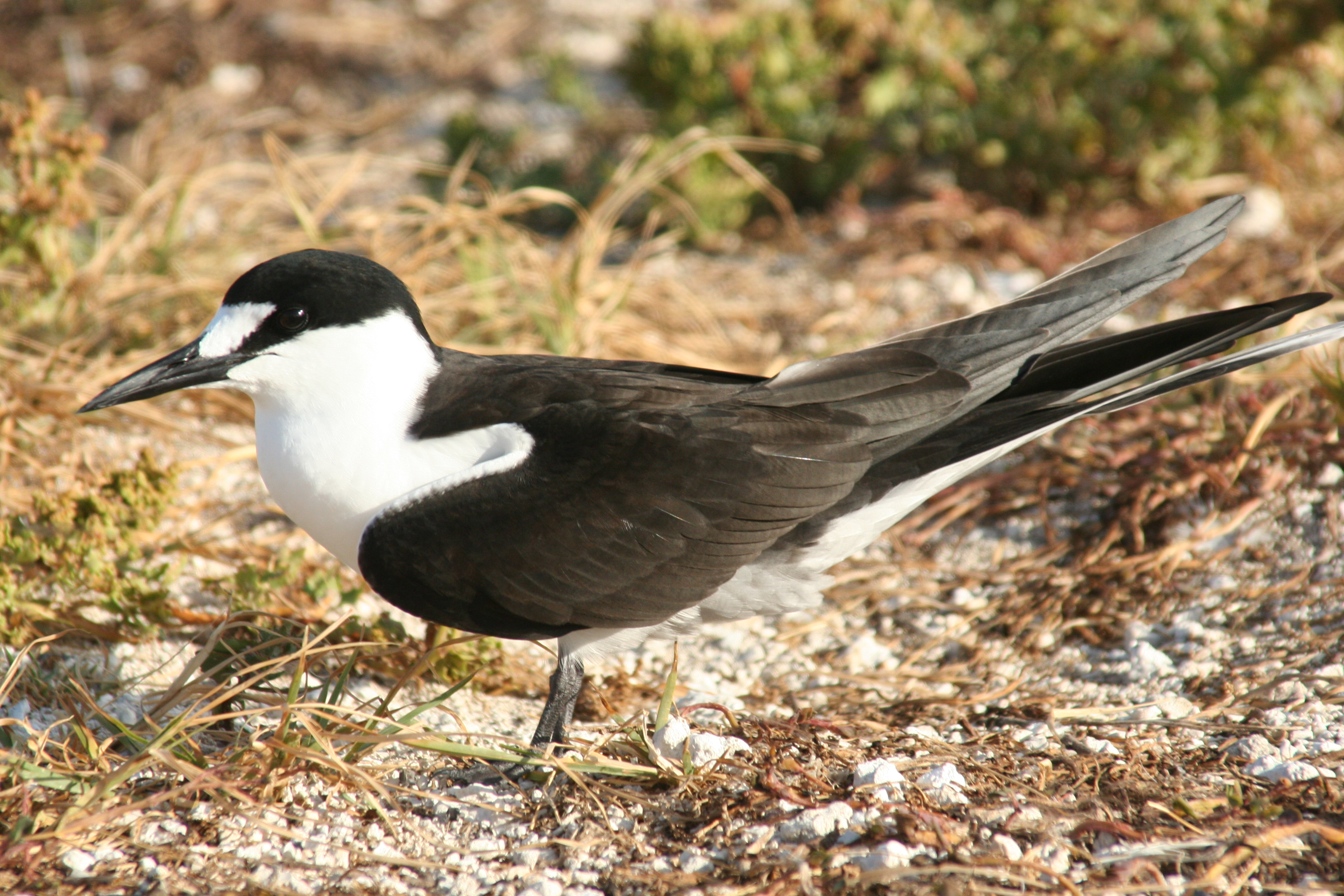
Sooty tern or gogo'uli, 67,500 nests were counted on Rose Atoll in 1998

Order: Charadriiformes Family: Laridae

Laridae is a family of medium to large seabirds, the gulls, terns, and skimmers. Gulls are typically gray or white, often with black markings on the head or wings. They have stout, longish bills and webbed feet. Terns are a group of generally medium to large seabirds typically with gray or white plumage, often with black markings on the head. Most terns hunt fish by diving but some pick insects off the surface of fresh water. Terns are generally long-lived birds, with several species known to live in excess of 30 years.

- Laughing gull, Leucophaeus atricilla (A)
- Brown noddy, Anous stolidus
- Black noddy, Anous minutus
- Blue-gray noddy, Anous ceruleus
- White tern, Gygis alba
- Sooty tern, Onychoprion fuscatus
- Gray-backed tern, Onychoprion lunatus
- Bridled tern, Onychoprion anaethetus (A)
- Black-naped tern, Sterna sumatrana (A)
- Greater crested tern, Thalasseus bergii (A)

== Tropicbirds ==
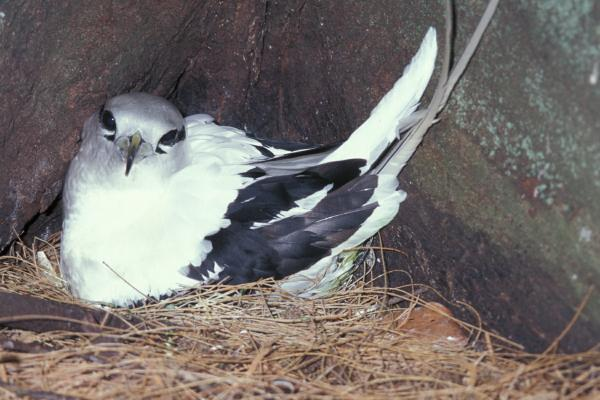
White-tailed tropicbird or tava'e, a common seabird

Order: Phaethontiformes Family: Phaethontidae

Tropicbirds are slender white birds of tropical oceans, with exceptionally long central tail feathers. Their heads and long wings have black markings.

- White-tailed tropicbird, Phaethon lepturus
- Red-tailed tropicbird, Phaethon rubricauda

== Southern storm-petrels ==
Order: Procellariiformes Family: Oceanitidae

The southern storm-petrels are relatives of the petrels and are the smallest seabirds. They feed on planktonic crustaceans and small fish picked from the surface, typically while hovering. The flight is fluttering and sometimes bat-like.

- White-faced storm-petrel, Pelagodroma marina (A)
- Black-bellied storm-petrel, Fregetta tropica (A)
- Polynesian storm-petrel, Nesofregetta fuliginosa

== Shearwaters and petrels ==
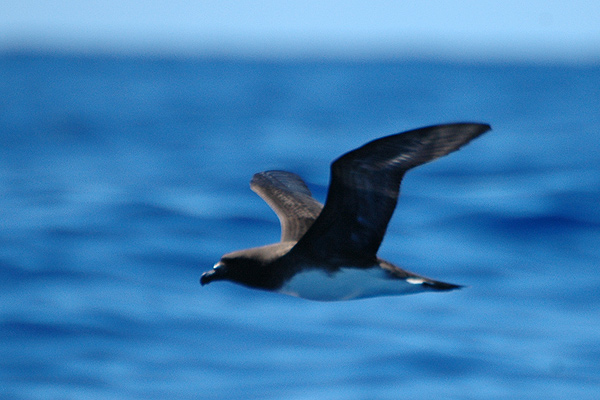
Tahiti petrel or tai'o, breeds in the mountains

Order: Procellariiformes Family: Procellariidae

The procellariids are the main group of medium-sized "true petrels", characterised by united nostrils with medium septum and a long outer functional primary.

- Herald petrel, Pterodroma heraldica
- Mottled petrel, Pterodroma inexpectata (A)
- White-necked petrel, Pterodroma cervicalis
- Black-winged petrel, Pterodroma nigripennis (A)
- Gould's petrel, Pterodroma leucoptera
- Collared petrel, Pterodroma brevipes
- Phoenix petrel, Pterodroma alba
- Tahiti petrel, Pterodroma rostrata
- Flesh-footed shearwater, Ardenna carneipes (A)
- Wedge-tailed shearwater, Ardenna pacificus
- Sooty shearwater, Ardenna griseus
- Short-tailed shearwater, Ardenna tenuirostris
- Christmas shearwater, Puffinus nativitatis
- Newell's shearwater, Puffinus newelli (A)
- Tropical shearwater, Puffinus bailloni

== Frigatebirds ==
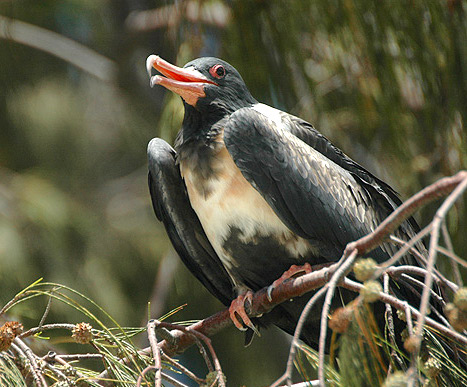
Lesser frigatebird or atafa, breeds on Rose Atoll

Order: Suliformes Family: Fregatidae

Frigatebirds are large seabirds usually found over tropical oceans. They are large, black-and-white, or completely black, with long wings and deeply forked tails. The males have colored inflatable throat pouches. They do not swim or walk and cannot take off from a flat surface. Having the largest wingspan-to-body-weight ratio of any bird, they are essentially aerial, able to stay aloft for more than a week.

- Lesser frigatebird, Fregata ariel
- Great frigatebird, Fregata minor

== Boobies and gannets ==
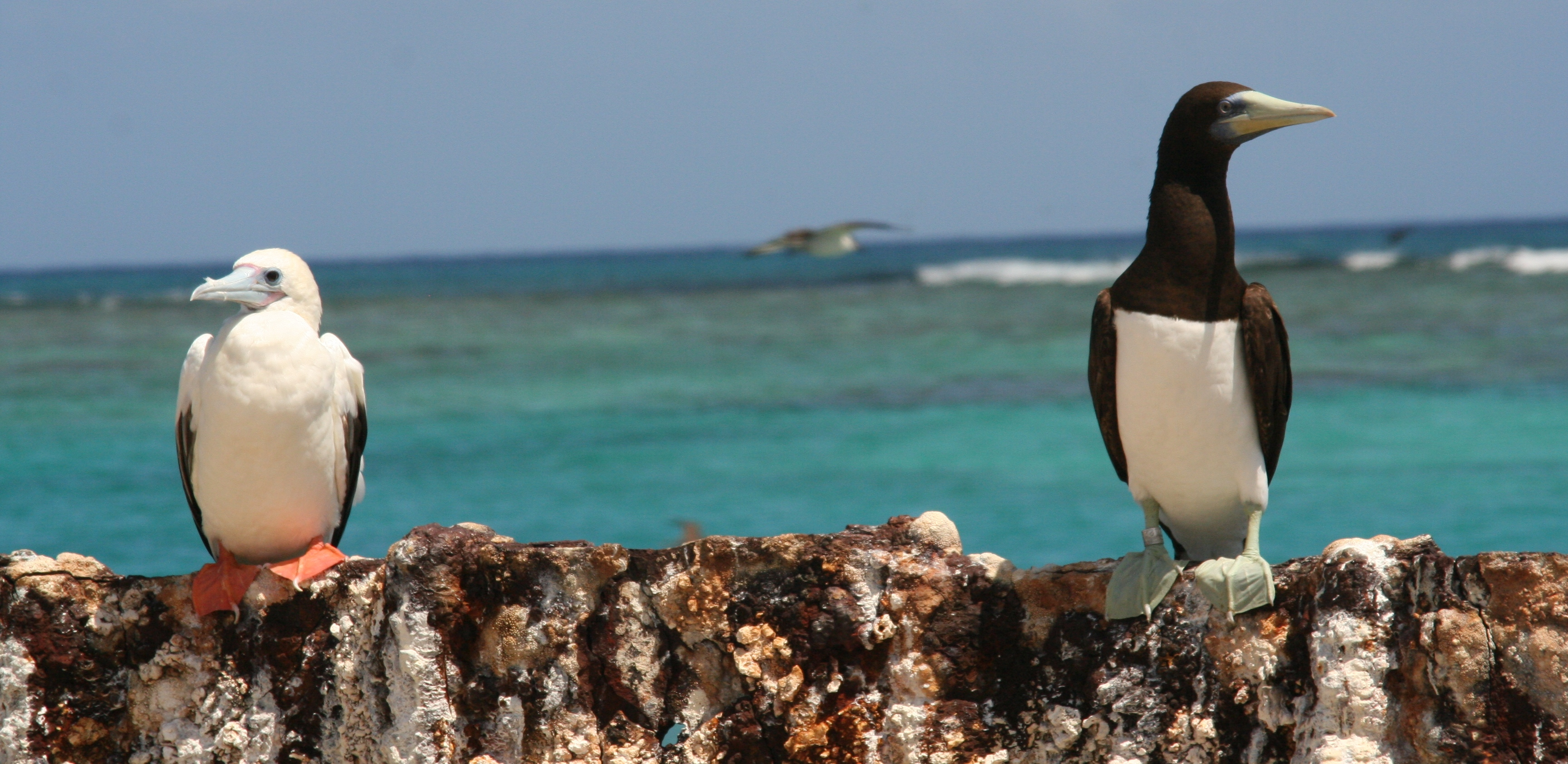
Red-footed booby (left) and brown booby (right), common offshore

Order: Suliformes Family: Sulidae

The sulids comprise the gannets and boobies. Both groups are medium to large coastal seabirds that plunge-dive for fish.

- Masked booby, Sula dactylatra
- Brown booby, Sula leucogaster
- Red-footed booby, Sula sula

== Herons, egrets, and bitterns ==
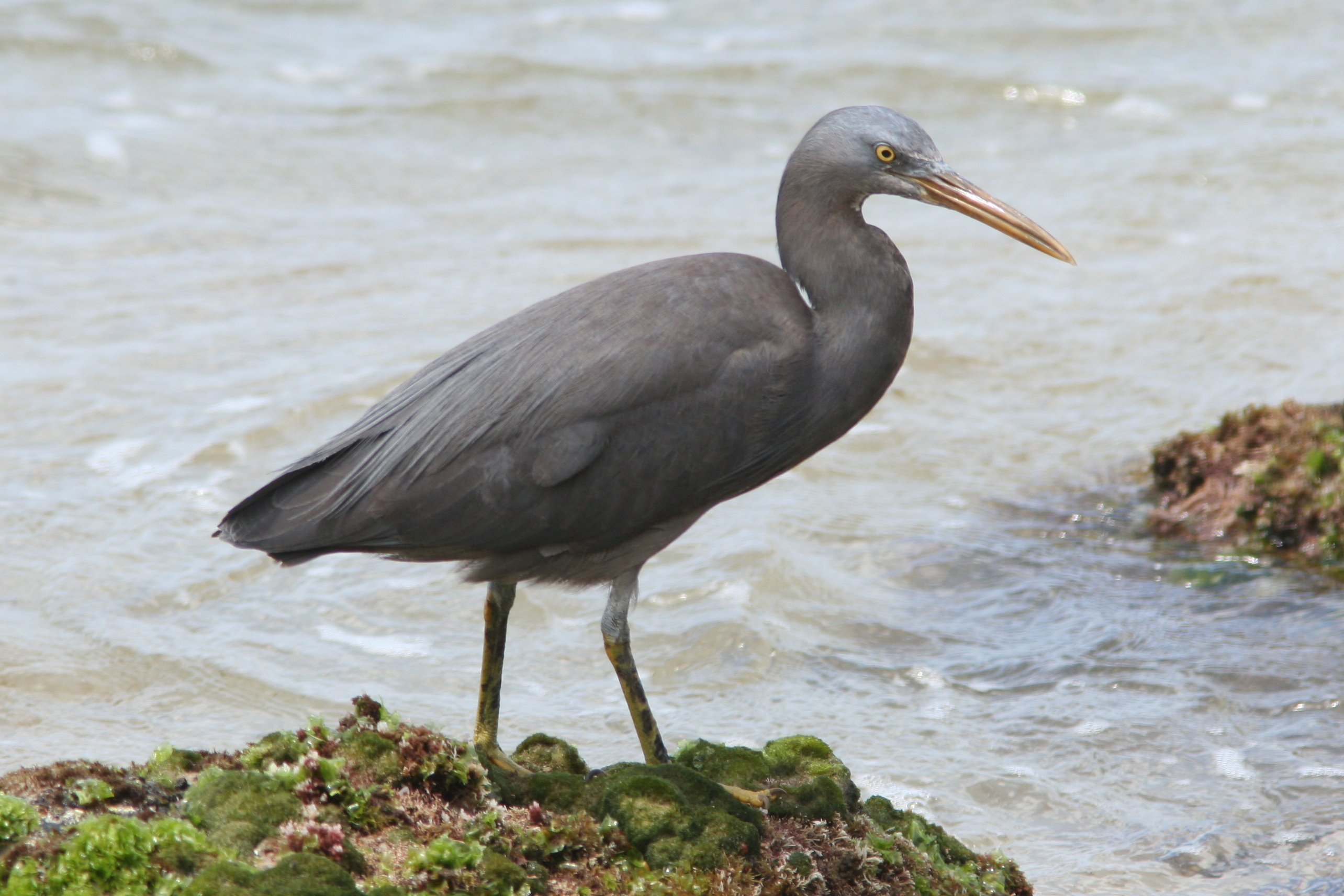
Pacific reef-heron or matu'u, common resident

Order: Pelecaniformes Family: Ardeidae

The family Ardeidae contains the bitterns, herons, and egrets. Herons and egrets are medium to large wading birds with long necks and legs. Bitterns tend to be shorter necked and more wary. Members of Ardeidae fly with their necks retracted, unlike other long-necked birds such as storks, ibises, and spoonbills.

- White-faced heron, Egretta novaehollandiae (A)
- Pacific reef-heron, Egretta sacra

== Barn-owls ==
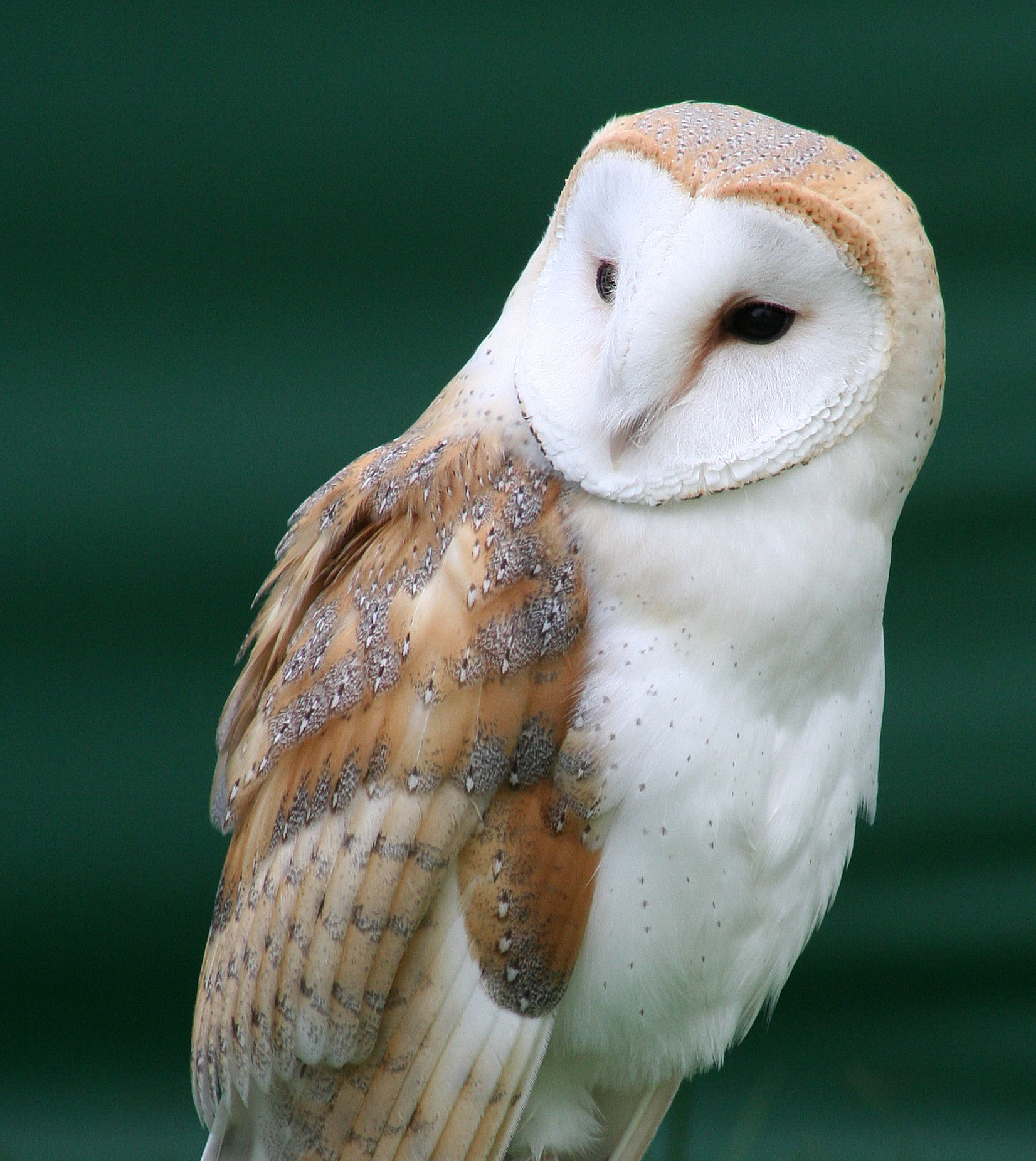
Barn owl or lulu, a widespread nocturnal bird

Order: Strigiformes Family: Tytonidae

Barn-owls are medium to large owls with large heads and characteristic heart-shaped faces. They have long strong legs with powerful talons.

- Eastern barn owl, Tyto javanica

== Kingfishers ==
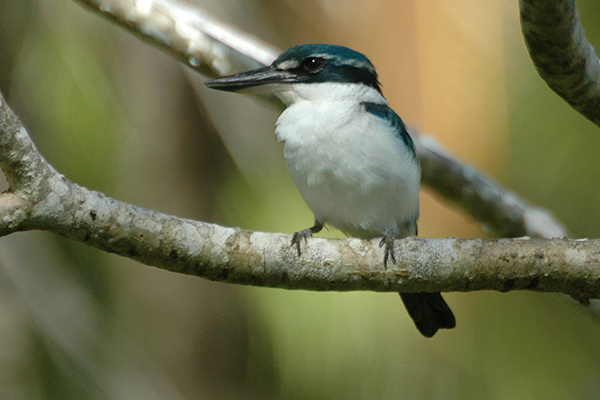
Pacific kingfisher or ti'otala is common in a variety of habitats

Order: Coraciiformes Family: Alcedinidae

Kingfishers are medium-sized birds with large heads, long pointed bills, short legs, and stubby tails.

- Pacific kingfisher, Todirhamphus sacer
- Collared kingfisher, Todiramphus chloris

== Old World parrots ==
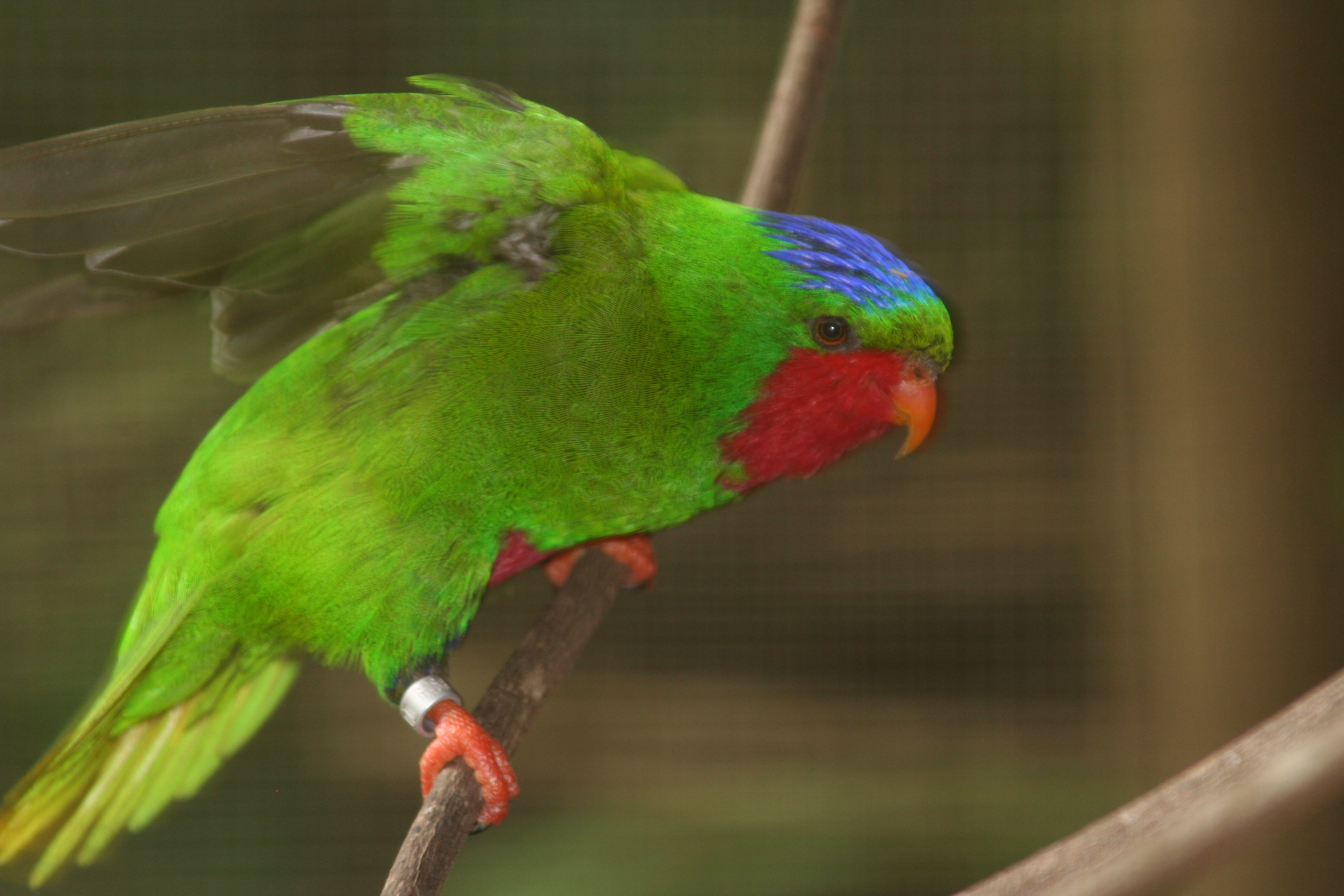
Blue-crowned lorikeet or segavao, breeds in the Manu'a islands

Order: Psittaciformes Family: Psittaculidae

Characteristic features of parrots include a strong curved bill, an upright stance, strong legs, and clawed zygodactyl feet. Many parrots are vividly colored, and some are multi-colored. In size they range from 8 cm (3.1 in) to 1 m (3.3 ft) in length. Old World parrots are found from Africa east across south and southeast Asia and Oceania to Australia and New Zealand.

- Blue-crowned lorikeet, Vini australis

== Honeyeaters ==
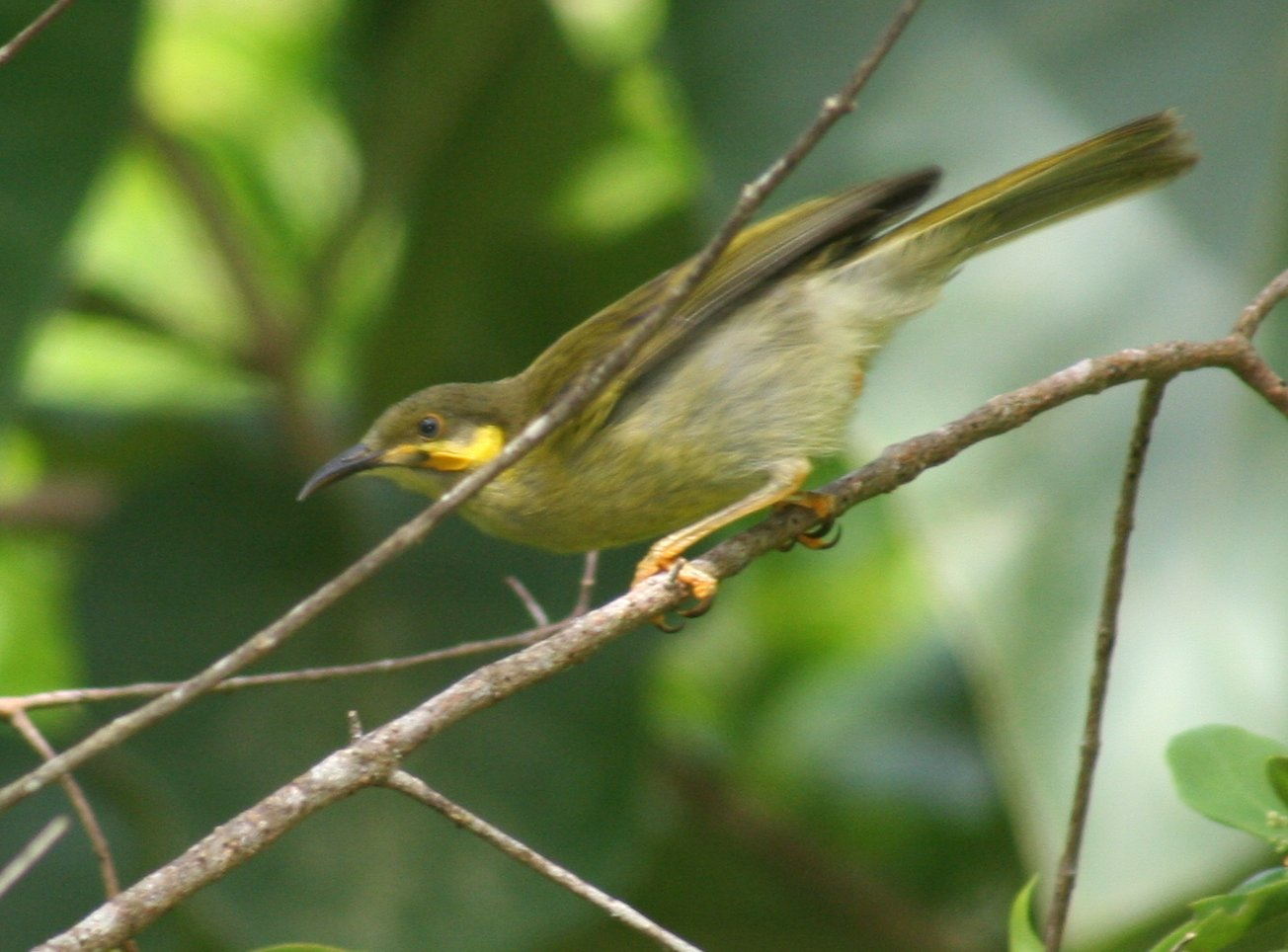
Eastern wattled-honeyeater or iao, a common resident

Order: Passeriformes Family: Meliphagidae

The honeyeaters are a large and diverse family of small to medium-sized birds most common in Australia and New Guinea. They are nectar feeders and closely resemble other nectar-feeding passerines.

- Samoan myzomela, Myzomela nigriventris
- Mao, Gymnomyza samoensis (Ex)
- Eastern wattled-honeyeater, Foulehaio carunculatus

== Monarch flycatchers ==
Order: Passeriformes Family: Monarchidae

The monarch flycatchers are small to medium-sized insectivorous passerines which hunt by flycatching.

- Fiji shrikebill, Clytorhynchus vitiensis

== Bulbuls ==
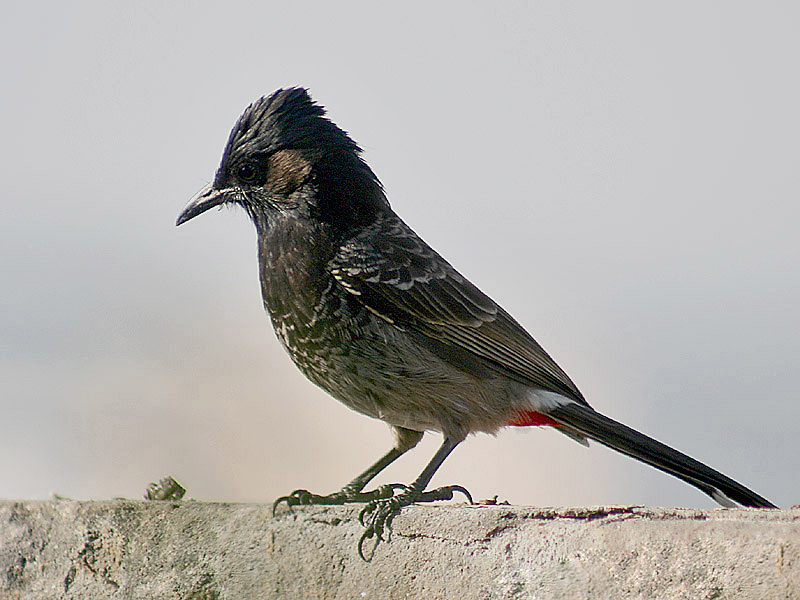
Red-vented bulbul or manu pālagi, introduced to Tutuila in the 1950s

Order: Passeriformes Family: Pycnonotidae

Bulbuls are medium-sized songbirds. Some are colorful with yellow, red, or orange vents, cheeks, throats or supercilia, but most are drab, with uniform olive-brown to black plumage. Some species have distinct crests.

- Red-vented bulbul, Pycnonotus cafer (I)

== Starlings ==
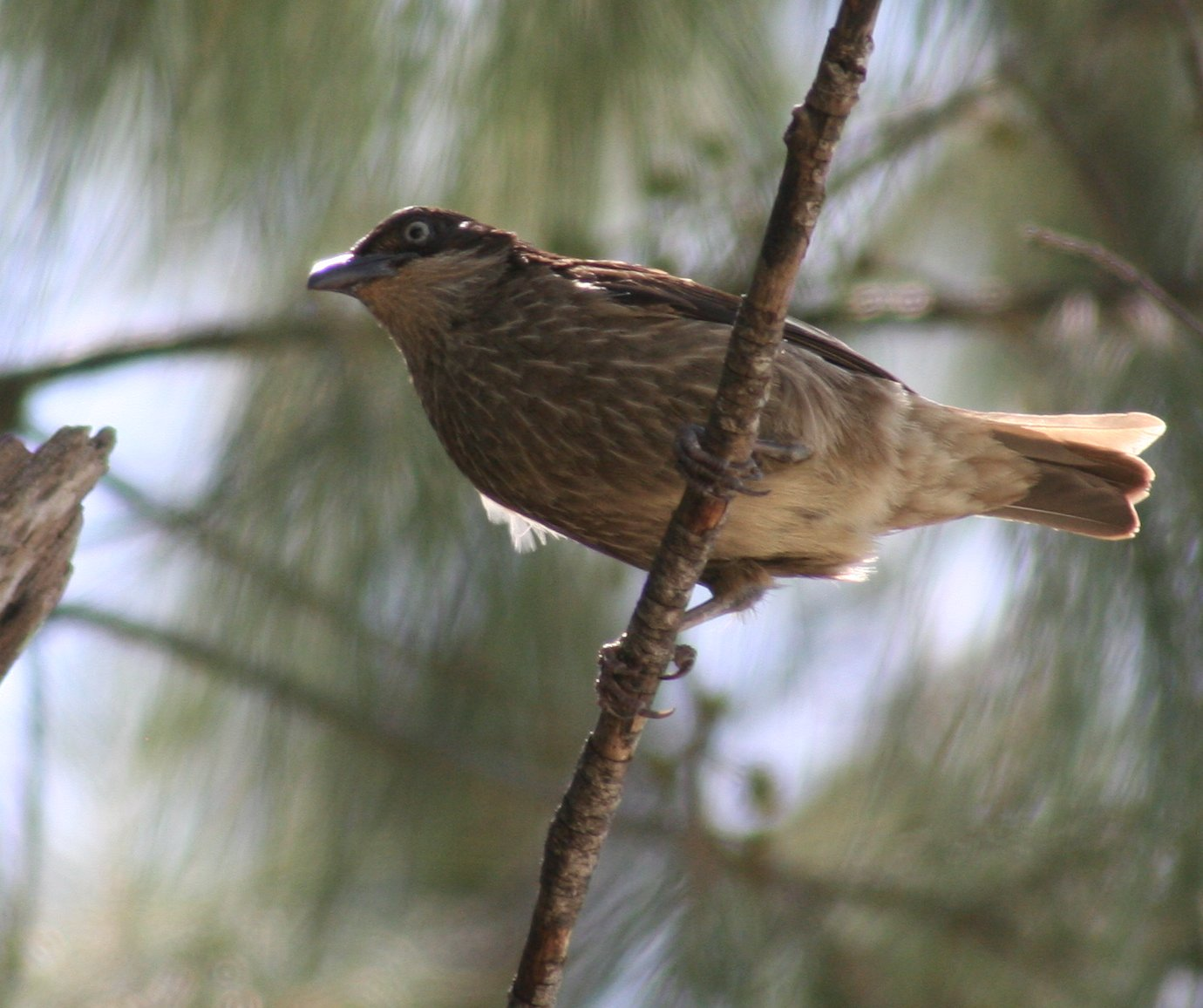
Polynesian starling or miti vao, a native bird of forests

Order: Passeriformes Family: Sturnidae

Starlings are small to medium-sized passerine birds. Their flight is strong and direct and they are very gregarious. Their preferred habitat is fairly open country. They eat insects and fruit. Plumage is typically dark with a metallic sheen.

- Polynesian starling, Aplonis tabuensis
- Samoan starling, Aplonis atrifusca
- Common myna, Acridotheres tristis (I)
- Jungle myna, Acridotheres fuscus (I)

== Thrushes ==
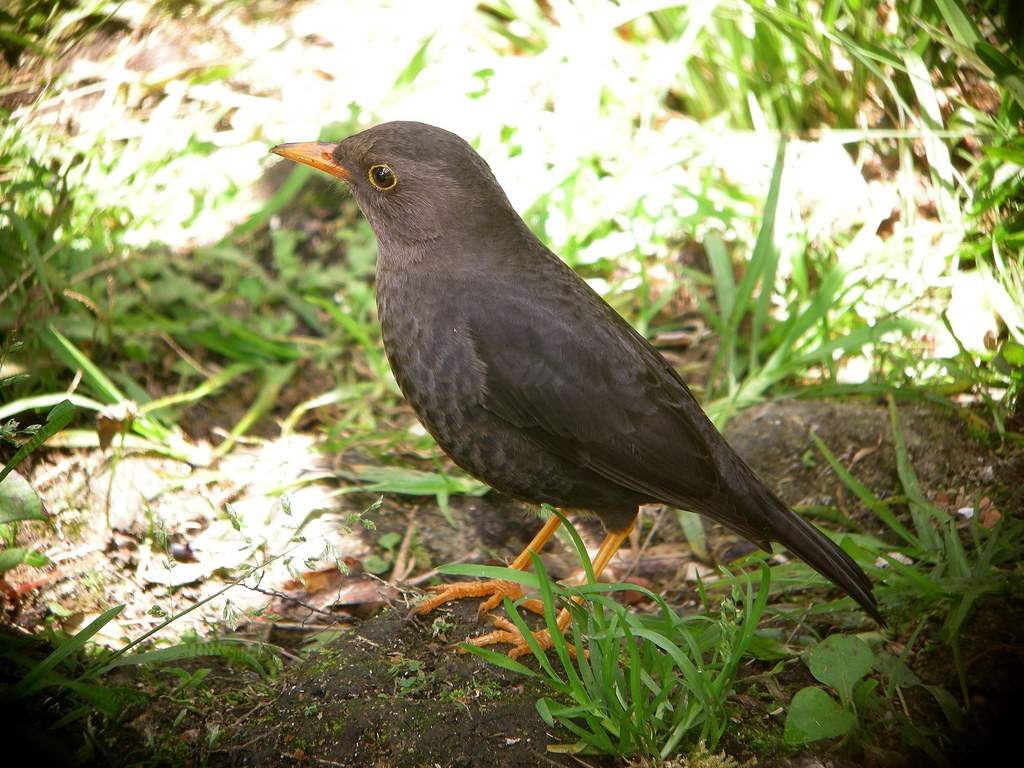
Island thrush

Order: Passeriformes Family: Turdidae

The thrushes are a group of passerine birds that occur mainly but not exclusively in the Old World. They are plump, soft plumaged, small to medium-sized insectivores or sometimes omnivores, often feeding on the ground. Many have attractive songs.

- Island thrush, Turdus poliocephalus

== See also ==
- List of mammals of American Samoa
- List of non-marine molluscs of American Samoa
- List of birds
- Lists of birds by region
