= Geology of American Samoa =

The geology of American Samoa is part of the broader geology of the Samoan island chain.

== Geologic history and origins ==
Except for Rose Atoll, the islands in the chain are geologically young, having formed within the last few million years, likely in the Pliocene or Quaternary. Preliminary mapping took place in the 1940s and 1950s, with a hiatus until the 1980s. Situated near the southwest margin of the Pacific Plate, American Samoa exhibits high volcanic mountains and submerged reef banks. Throughout the island chain, islands get larger to the west, with the eroded Rose Atoll in the east.

The island chain is inferred to be related to hotspot volcanism, with alkali basalt rather than a tholeiitic magma series. On Tutuila, tuff and lava flows dominate most of the surface.
