= List of reptiles of American Samoa =

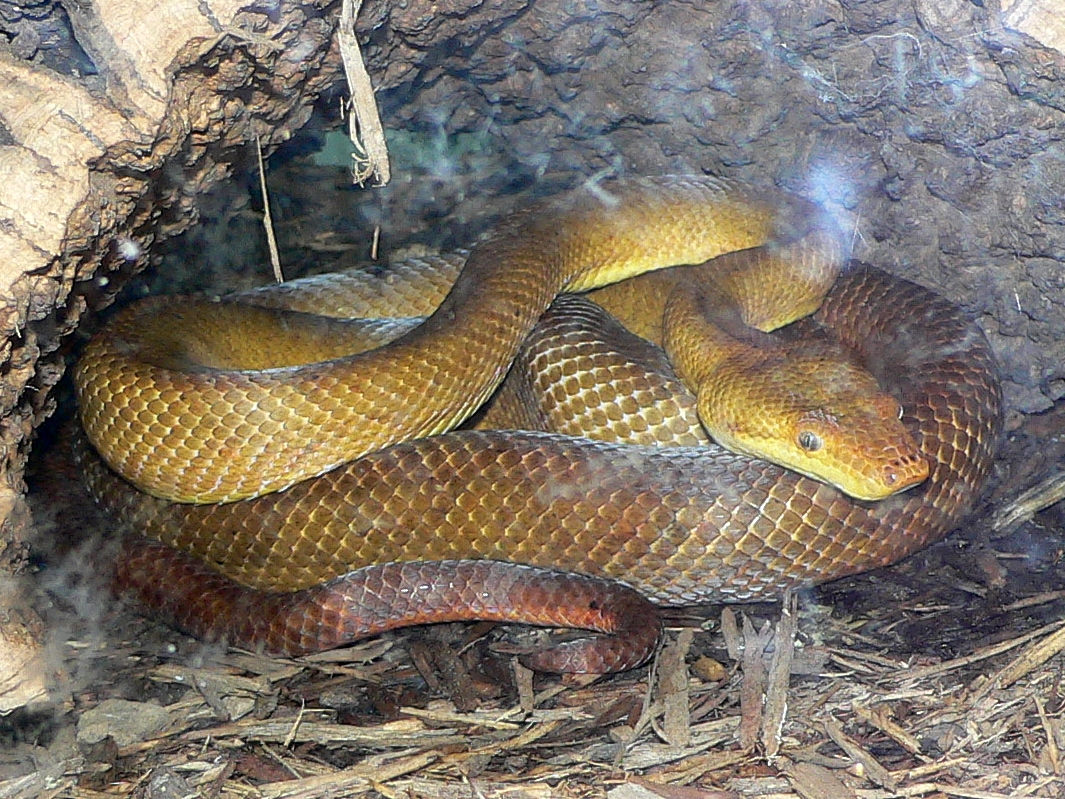
The Pacific boa

This is a list of reptiles of American Samoa.

Conservation status - IUCN Red List of Threatened Species:

EX - Extinct, EW - Extinct in the wild
CR - Critically endangered, EN - Endangered, VU - Vulnerable
NT - Near threatened, LC - Least concern
DD - Data deficient, NE - Not evaluated
(v.2026.1, the data is current as of 3 September 2026)

== Marine reptiles ==
- Sea turtles
  - Hawksbill sea turtle (Eretmochelys imbricata) CR
  - Green sea turtle (laumei ena’ena, fonu) (Chelonia mydas) LC
  - Olive ridley sea turtle (Lepidochelys olivacea) VU
  - Leatherback sea turtle (Dermochelys coriacea) VU
- Sea snakes
  - Yellow-bellied sea snake (Hydrophis platurus) LC
  - Yellow-lipped sea krait (Laticauda colubrina) LC

== Land reptiles ==
- Geckos
  - Pacific slender-toed gecko (Nactus pelagicus) LC Polynesian introduction
  - Oceanic gecko (Gehyra oceanica) LC
  - Mourning gecko (Lepidodactylus lugubris) LC Polynesian introduction
  - Stump-toed gecko (Gehyra mutilata) LC modern introduction
  - House gecko (Hemidactylus frenatus) LC modern introduction
- Skinks
  - Pacific snake-eyed skink (Cryptoblepharus poecilopleurus) LC
  - Micronesian skink (Emoia adspersa) EN
  - White-bellied / brown-tailed striped skink (Emoia cyanura) LC Polynesian introduction
  - Dark-bellied or blue-tailed striped skink (Emoia impar) LC Polynesian introduction
  - Günther's emo skink (Emoia lawesii) EN
  - Pacific black skink (Emoia nigra) LC Polynesian introduction
  - Samoan skink (Emoia samoensis) EN Polynesian introduction
  - Moth skink (Lipinia noctua) LC Polynesian introduction
- Snakes
  - Pacific boa (Candoia bibroni) (found on Ta‘ū island) LC Polynesian introduction
  - Brahminy blind snake (Indotyphlops braminus) LC modern introduction
