= Telecommunications in American Samoa =

Communication services in American Samoa are diversified among telephony, radio broadcasting, television, and Internet services.

== Telephone ==
Membership: North American Numbering Plan (NANP)

- Land lines in use: 10,400 (2004); country comparison to the world: 202
- Mobile cellular subscribers: 2,200 (2004); country comparison to the world: 210
- domestic services: telex, telegraph, facsimile and cellular telephone services; domestic satellite system with one Comsat earth station
- international services: satellite earth station – Intelsat (Pacific Ocean)'
- Country code: 1
- NANP area code: 684
- International telephone number format: +1 684 NXX-XXXX (N=2–9, X=0–9)
- international access code: 011

== Radio ==
Radio broadcast stations: AM 0, FM 4 commercial, 4 non-commercial, 2 LPFM, shortwave 0 (2005)

Radios: 57,000 (1997)

== Television ==
Television broadcast stations: 4 (2006) Televisions: 14,000 (1997)

== Internet ==
In 2009, American Samoa was connected to the Internet using the American Samoa Hawaii Cable (ASH) undersea communications cable that increased bandwidth from 20 Mbit/s to 1 Gbit/s. The project used a defunct PacRim East cable built in 1993 that previously connected Hawaii with New Zealand. The cable system now connects Samoa to American Samoa and then to Hawaii where it will connect to global submarine networks. In July 2018, the Hawaiki cable was activated with a branch providing a 200 Gb/s connection from Pago Pago to Hawaii, New Zealand, Australia, and Oregon.

=== Situation in 2016 ===
In 2012, American Samoa had the most expensive Internet access service in the U.S. according to Engadget.

Under Governor Togiola Tulafono investment in a fibre optic network to replace aging copper infrastructure across all the islands of American Samoa and the construction in 2015 of a 1.2 Gbit/s satellite uplink via O3b Networks which more than doubled available bandwidth to the rest of the world resulted in broadband Internet service becoming more affordable, with the price of the cheapest available residential package decreasing from $75/month to $50/month and download speeds of the base package increasing from 256 kbit/s to 768 kbit/s. The improved connectivity to the outside world has revived previously stalled hopes that a call center could be opened in American Samoa, boosting the local economy.

Internet service providers (ISPs)	three ?
Internet country code	.as
Internet Hosts	1,923 (2008) country rank in the world: 141
Internet users	NA

== Aleki Sene, Sr. Telecommunications Center ==
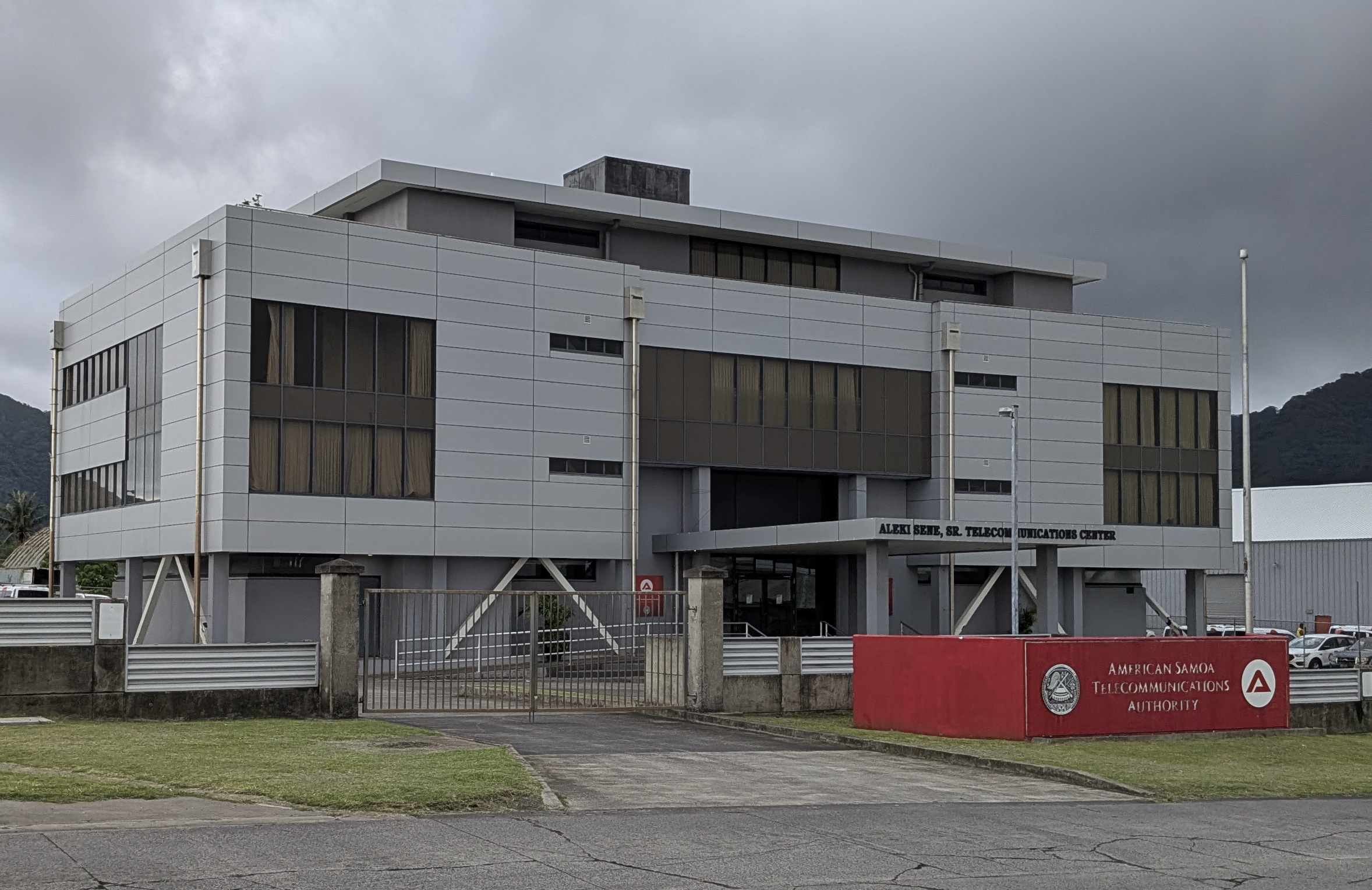
Aleki Sene, Sr. Telecommunications Center

The Aleki Sene, Sr. Telecommunications Center in Tafuna is the tallest building in American Samoa (it is 4 stories tall). Construction of the building began in 2009 and ended in 2011. Out of the tallest buildings of each U.S. state and territory, the Aleki Sene, Sr. Telecommunications Center is the shortest.
