= Politics of American Samoa =

Politics of American Samoa takes place in a framework of a presidential representative democratic dependency, whereby the governor is the head of government, and of a pluriform multi-party system. American Samoa is an unincorporated and unorganized territory of the United States, administered by the Office of Insular Affairs, U.S. Department of the Interior. Its constitution was ratified in 1966 and came into effect in 1967. Executive power is discharged by the governor and the lieutenant governor. Legislative power is vested in the two chambers of the legislature. The party system is based on the United States party system. The judiciary is independent of the executive and the legislature.

There is also the traditional village politics of the Samoan Islands, the fa'amatai and the faʻa Sāmoa, which continues in American Samoa and in independent Samoa, and which interacts across these current boundaries. The faʻa Sāmoa is the language and customs, and the fa'amatai the protocols of the fono (council) and the chiefly system. The fa'amatai and the fono take place at all levels of the Samoan body politic, from the family, to the village, to the region, to national matters. The matai (chiefs) are elected by consensus within the fono of the extended family and village(s) concerned. The matai and the fono (which is itself made of matai) decide on distribution of family exchanges and tenancy of communal lands. The majority of lands in American Samoa and independent Samoa are communal. A matai can represent a small family group or a great extended family that reaches across islands, and to both American Samoa and independent Samoa.

== Government ==
The government of American Samoa is defined under the Constitution of American Samoa. As an unincorporated territory, the Ratification Act of 1929 vested all civil, judicial, and military powers in the president, who in turn delegated authority to the secretary of the interior in Executive Order 10264. The secretary promulgated the Constitution of American Samoa which was approved by a constitutional convention of the people of American Samoa and a majority of the voters of American Samoa voting at the 1966 election, and came into effect in 1967.

The governor of American Samoa is the head of government and along with the lieutenant governor of American Samoa is elected on the same ticket by popular vote for four-year terms.

The legislative power is vested in the American Samoa Fono, which has two chambers. The House of Representatives has 21 members serving two-year terms, being 20 representatives popularly elected from various districts and one delegate from Swains Island elected in a public meeting. The Senate has 18 members, elected for four-year terms by and from the chiefs of the islands.

The judiciary of American Samoa is composed of the High Court of American Samoa, a District Court, and village courts. The High Court is led by a chief justice and an associate justice, appointed by the secretary of the interior. Other judges are appointed by the governor upon the recommendation of the chief justice and confirmed by the Senate.

== International organization participation ==
- United Nations Economic and Social Commission for Asia and the Pacific (associate)
- Interpol (subbureau)
- International Olympic Committee
- Pacific Community

== See also ==
- Political party strength in American Samoa
- American Samoa's at-large congressional district
