= American Samoa Department of Public Safety =

Law enforcement agency in American Samoa

American Samoa Territorial Police patch

The American Samoa Department of Public Safety, formerly the American Samoa Territorial Police, is the police law enforcement agency for American Samoa, which has jurisdiction anywhere in the territory. It was created to protect the lives and property of American Samoans. The DPS has police, corrections and fire divisions.

The Department of Public Safety was established in 1978 under Public Law 16-29. It brought together the police system, fire, Correctional Facility, and the Office of Motor Vehicle, which was responsible for the licensing and registration of vehicles.

Airport police, port police conservation officers, and community college police departments are also active in American Samoa.

The police on the island carry the Glock 17 in 9mm as the standard sidearm.

== Corrections ==
It is in charge of the Tafuna Correctional Facility (TCF), the sole correctional facility in the territory.

In 2008 former Tafuna warden Mika Kelemete, along with a prison guard at Tafuna, received a civil rights violation prison sentence from U.S. federal authorities.

== Fallen officers ==
3 officers from the American Samoa Department of Public Safety have been killed in the line of duty.
