= List of Superfund sites in American Samoa =

This is a list of Superfund sites in American Samoa designated under the Comprehensive Environmental Response, Compensation, and Liability Act (CERCLA) environmental law. The CERCLA federal law of 1980 authorized the United States Environmental Protection Agency (EPA) to create a list of polluted locations requiring a long-term response to clean up hazardous material contaminations.

These locations are known as Superfund sites, and are placed on the National Priorities List (NPL). The NPL guides the EPA in "determining which sites warrant further investigation" for environmental remediation. As of May 7, 2020 there were no Superfund sites on the National Priorities List in American Samoa. No additional sites are currently proposed for entry on the list. One site has been cleaned up and removed from the list.

CERCLIS ID	Name	Location	Reason	Proposed	Listed	Construction completed	Partially deleted	Deleted
ASD980637656	Taputimu Farm	Pago Pago	Ten drums in a warehouse and trailer leaked pesticides containing base neutral acids, polychlorinated biphenyls, persistent organic pollutants, and volatile organic compound.	12/30/1982	09/08/1983	03/07/1986	N/A	03/07/1986

== See also ==
- List of Superfund sites in the United States
- List of environmental issues
- List of waste types
- TOXMAP
