= Economy of American Samoa =

- Currency: US dollar (USD)
- Fiscal year: 1 October – 30 September
- Trade organizations: WTO

Statistics
- GDP: ▲$1.068 billion (nominal; 2024f); ▲$1.480 billion (PPP; 2024f)
- GDP rank: 187th (nominal) / 190th (PPP)
- GDP growth: 1.7% (2022)
- GDP per capita: ▲$5,048.032 (nominal; 2024f); ▲$6,998.213 (PPP; 2024f)
- GDP by sector: NA
- Inflation (CPI): ▼1.951% (2024f)
- Population below national poverty line: NA
- Labor force: 17,630 (2007)
- Labor force by occupation: agriculture 34%, industry 33%, services 33% (1990)
- Unemployment: 8.36% (2020)
- Main industries: tuna canneries (largely dependent on foreign fishing vessels), handicrafts

External
- Exports: $69.9 million (2018)
- Export goods: canned tuna 93% (2004)
- Main export partners: Australia 30.7%; United Kingdom 17.7%; Tanzania 9.11%; UAE 7.07% (2023)
- Imports: $147 million (2018)
- Import goods: materials for canneries 56%, food 8%, petroleum products 7%, machinery and parts 6% (2004)
- Main import partners: Singapore 28.3%; New Zealand 15.3%; Fiji 14.4%; Taiwan 11.3%; Malaysia 10.9% (2023)

Public finance
- Government debt: 69.5 million (2015)
- Revenue: $121 million (37% in local revenue and 63% in US grants) (1997)
- Spending: $127 million (1997)
- Economic aid: more than $40 million from US in financial support (1994)
- All values, unless otherwise stated, are in US dollars.

The economy of American Samoa is a traditional Polynesian economy in which more than 90% of the land is communally owned. American Samoa is an unincorporated territory of the United States; economic activity is strongly linked to the main customs zone of the U.S., with which American Samoa conducts the great bulk of its trade. Tuna fishing and processing plants are the backbone of the private sector, with canned tuna being the primary export. Transfers from the U.S. federal government add substantially to American Samoa's economic well-being. Attempts by the government to develop a larger and broader economy are restrained by Samoa's remote location, its limited transportation, and its devastating hurricanes.

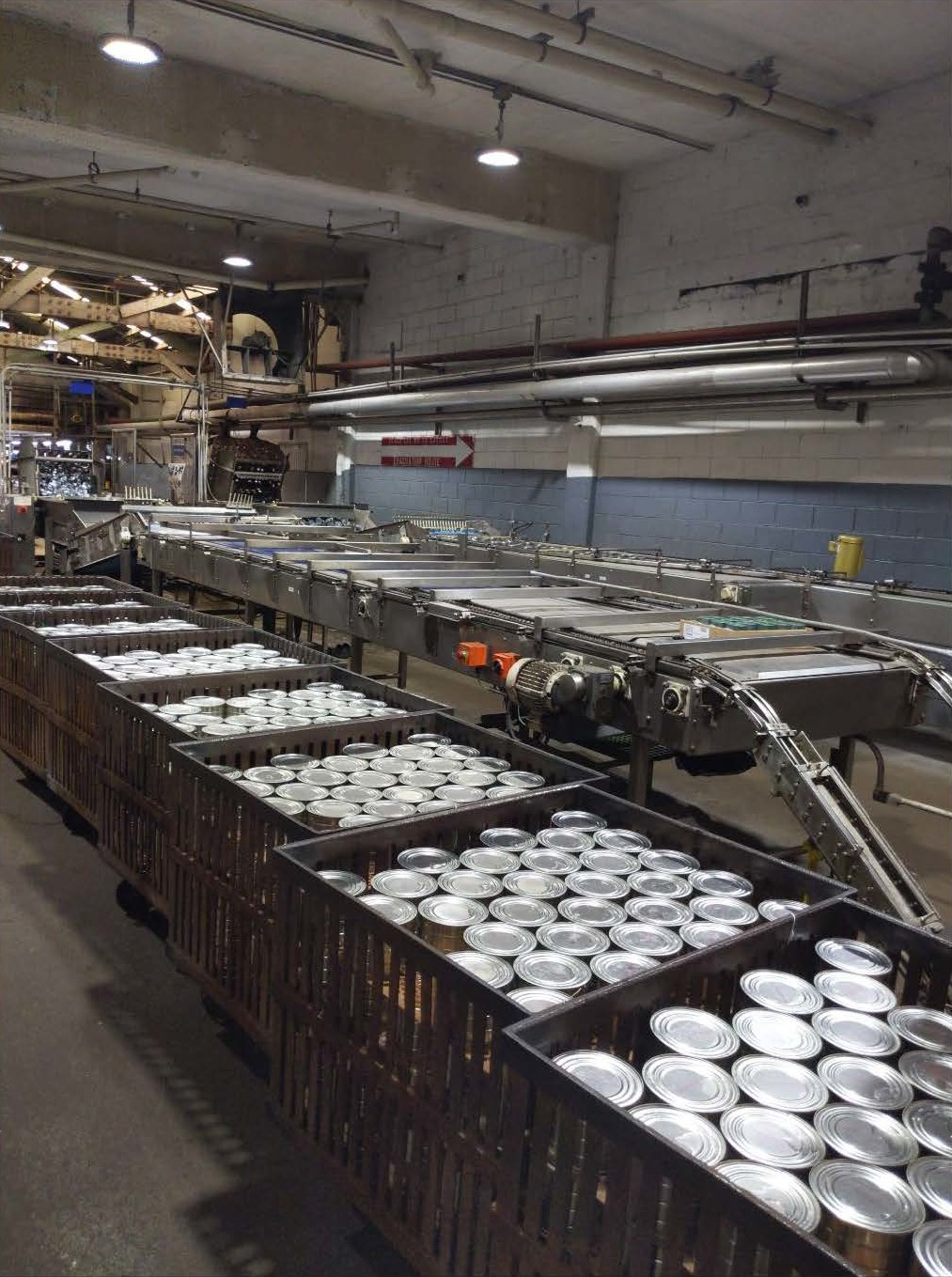
A StarKist tuna cannery; tuna canning represents a major export industry in the territory

== Statistics ==
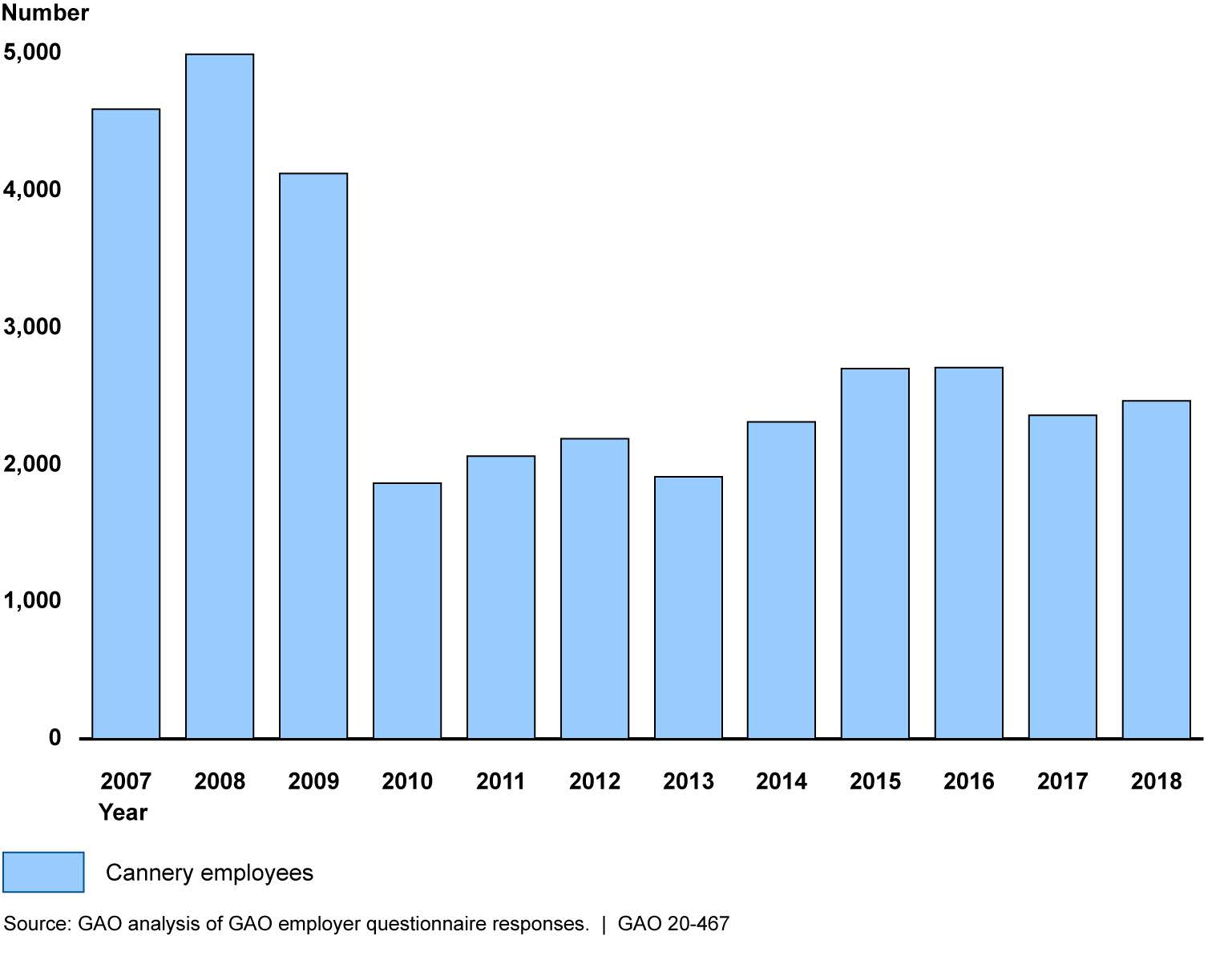
Employment in the canning industry in American Samoa. Employment in the industry fell following the 2009 closure of a Chicken of the Sea cannery.

GDP: purchasing power parity – $537 million (2007 est.)
country comparison to the world: 210

GDP (official exchange rate): $462.2 million (2005)

GDP – real growth rate: 3% (2003)
country comparison to the world: 139

GDP – per capita: purchasing power parity – $7,874 (2008)
country comparison to the world: 120

GDP – composition by sector:
agriculture: NA%
industry: NA%
services: NA% (2002)

Labor Force: 17,630 (2005)
country comparison to the world: 203

Labor force – by occupation: government 33%, tuna canneries 34%, other 33% (1990)

Unemployment rate: 23.8% (2010)
country comparison to the world: 175

Population below poverty line: NA% (2002 est.)

Household income or consumption by percentage share:
lowest 10%: NA%
highest 10%: NA%

Inflation rate (consumer prices): NA% (2003 est.)

Budget:
revenues: $155.4 million (37% in local revenue and 63% in US grants)
expenditures: $183.6 million (FY07)

Agriculture – products: bananas, coconuts, vegetables, taro, breadfruit, yams, copra, pineapples, papayas; dairy products, livestock

Industries: tuna canneries (largely dependent on foreign fishing vessels), handicrafts

Industrial production growth rate: NA%

Electricity – production: 180 GWh (2006)
country comparison to the world: 179

Electricity – production by source:
fossil fuel: 100%
hydro: 0%
nuclear: 0%
other: 0% (2001)

Electricity – consumption: 167.4 GWh (2006)
country comparison to the world: 179

Electricity – exports: 0 kWh (2007)

Electricity – imports: 0 kWh (2007)

Oil – production: 0 barrels per day (0 m^{3}/d) (2007 est.)
country comparison to the world: 209

Oil – consumption: 4,053 barrels per day (644.4 m^{3}/d) (604 m^{3}/d), 2006
country comparison to the world: 170

Oil – exports: 0 barrels per day (0 m^{3}/d) (2005)
country comparison to the world: 142

Oil – imports: 4,066 barrels per day (646.4 m^{3}/d) (2005)
country comparison to the world: 166

Natural gas – production: 0 cu m (2007)
country comparison to the world: 208

Natural gas – consumption: 0 cu m (2007)
country comparison to the world: 207

Natural gas – exports: 0 cu m (2007)
country comparison to the world: 202

Natural gas – imports: 0 cu m (2007)
country comparison to the world: 201

Natural gas – proved reserves: 0 cu m (2006)
country comparison to the world: 205

Exports: $445.6 million (2004)
country comparison to the world: 167

Exports – commodities: canned tuna 93% (2004)

Exports – partners: Indonesia 70%, Australia 6.7%, Japan 6.7%, Samoa 6.7% (2002)

Imports: $308.8 million (2004)
country comparison to the world: 195

Imports – commodities: materials for canneries 56%, food 8%, petroleum products 7%, machinery and parts 6% (2004)

Imports – partners: Australia 36.6%, New Zealand 20.3%, South Korea 16.3%, Mauritius 4.9% (2002)

Debt – external: $NA (2002 est.)

Economic aid – recipient: $NA; note – important financial support from the US, more than $40 million in 1994

Currency: US dollar (USD)

Currency code: USD

Exchange rates: US dollar is used

Fiscal year: 1 October – 30 September
