= List of mammals of American Samoa =

There are eight mammal species in the United States territory of American Samoa, of which one is endangered and two are vulnerable. Four of the species found in American Samoa are bats, two are whales, and two are dolphins.

The following tags are used to highlight each species' conservation status as assessed by the International Union for Conservation of Nature:

EX	Extinct	No reasonable doubt that the last individual has died.
EW	Extinct in the wild	Known only to survive in captivity or as a naturalized populations well outside its previous range.
CR	Critically endangered	The species is in imminent risk of extinction in the wild.
EN	Endangered	The species is facing an extremely high risk of extinction in the wild.
VU	Vulnerable	The species is facing a high risk of extinction in the wild.
NT	Near threatened	The species does not meet any of the criteria that would categorise it as risking extinction but it is likely to do so in the future.
LC	Least concern	There are no current identifiable risks to the species.
DD	Data deficient	There is inadequate information to make an assessment of the risks to this species.

== Order: Chiroptera (bats) ==
The bats' most distinguishing feature is that their forelimbs are developed as wings, making them the only mammals capable of flight. Bat species account for about 20% of all mammals.

- Family: Pteropodidae (flying foxes, Old World fruit bats)
  - Subfamily: Pteropodinae
    - Genus: Pteropus
      - Samoa flying-fox, Pteropus samoensis VU
      - Insular flying-fox, Pteropus tonganus LR/lc
- Family: Vespertilionidae
  - Subfamily: Myotinae
    - Genus: Myotis
      - Insular myotis, Myotis insularum DD
- Family: Emballonuridae
  - Genus: Emballonura
    - Polynesian sheath-tailed bat, Emballonura semicaudata EN

== Order: Cetacea (whales) ==
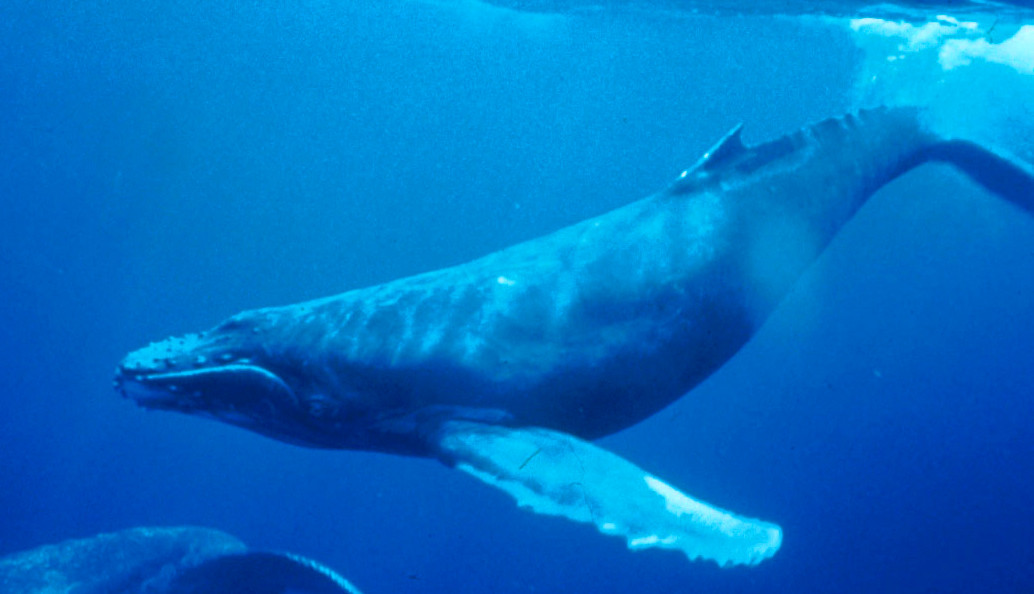
Humpback whale

The order Cetacea includes whales, dolphins and porpoises. They are the mammals most fully adapted to aquatic life with a spindle-shaped nearly hairless body, protected by a thick layer of blubber, and forelimbs and tail modified to provide propulsion underwater.

- Suborder: Mysticeti
  - Family: Balaenopteridae
    - Subfamily: Megapterinae
      - Genus: Megaptera
        - Humpback whale, Megaptera novaeangliae LC
- Suborder: Odontoceti
  - Superfamily: Platanistoidea
    - Family: Ziphidae
      - Subfamily: Hyperoodontinae
        - Genus: Mesoplodon
          - Ginkgo-toothed beaked whale, Mesoplodon ginkgodens DD
    - Family: Delphinidae (marine dolphins)
      - Genus: Stenella
        - Spinner dolphin, Stenella longirostris LR/cd
      - Genus: Lagenodelphis
        - Fraser's dolphin, Lagenodelphis hosei DD

== See also ==
- List of chordate orders
- Lists of mammals by region
- List of prehistoric mammals
- Mammal classification
- List of mammals described in the 2000s
