= Seal of American Samoa =

Official government emblem of the U.S. territory of American Samoa

- Armiger: American Samoa
- Motto: Samoa Muamua Le Atua "Samoa, God Is First"

The seal of American Samoa is based on traditional local designs.

The fly-whisk (fue) representing wisdom crossed with the orator’s staff (to'oto'o) representing authority are borne by talking chiefs to signify their rank. The tanoa (kava bowl) beneath the regalia represents service to the chief, while the tapa cloth background represents the artistry of the Samoan people. It also includes the date April 17, 1900, which was the date when Samoa became a United States territory.

On Flag Day April 17, 1973, the official seal of American Samoa, with the motto, Sāmoa Muamua Le Atua (English: "Samoa, Let God Be First"), was dedicated.

The seal was introduced to the U.S. House of Representatives on March 2, 1985, by Delegate Fofó Iosefa Fiti Sunia, who had made the request in November 1981. The artwork was done by the staff of the architect of the capitol.
