= Demographics of American Samoa =

Demographics of American Samoa include population density, ethnicity, education level, health of the populace, economic status, religious affiliations and other aspects. American Samoa is an unincorporated territory of the United States located in the South Pacific Ocean.

== Population ==
Census population

Year	Pop.	±% p.a.
1900	5,679	—
1912	7,251	+2.06%
1920	8,056	+1.32%
1930	10,055	+2.24%
1940	12,908	+2.53%
1950	18,937	+3.91%
1960	20,051	+0.57%

Year	Pop.	±% p.a.
1970	27,159	+3.08%
1980	32,297	+1.75%
1990	46,773	+3.77%
2000	57,291	+2.05%
2010	55,519	−0.31%
2020	49,710	−1.10%

The statistics from 1900 to 1950 and every decennial census are from the U.S. Census Bureau. There was no census taken in 1910, but a special census taken in 1912. Beginning with the 1930 Census, Swain Island is included in the population count for American Samoa. The remaining statistics are from the World Factbook, unless otherwise indicated.

- Approximately 55,212, but the Factbook states 49,437 (2020 estimate). About 65% of the population are U.S. nationals, of whom at least 10% are U.S. citizens. Of the foreign-born population, 81% are from Samoa, 9% are from other parts of Oceania, and 9% are from Asia.

== Structure of the population ==
Population by Sex and Age Group (Census 01.IV.2010):

Age group	Male	Female	Total	%
Total	28 164	27 355	55 519	100
0–4	3 417	3 194	6 611	11.91
5–9	3 470	3 065	6 535	11.77
10–14	3 214	3 065	6 279	11.31
15–19	3 218	3 078	6 296	11.34
20–24	1 944	1 947	3 891	7.01
25–29	1 670	1 654	3 324	5.99
30–34	1 726	1 784	3 510	6.32
35–39	1 845	1 764	3 609	6.50
40–44	1 793	1 807	3 600	6.48
45–49	1 673	1 716	3 389	6.10
50–54	1 335	1 344	2 679	4.83
55–59	1 011	1 038	2 049	3.69
60–64	755	725	1 480	2.67
65–69	500	460	960	1.73
70–74	321	333	654	1.18
75–79	155	182	337	0.61
80–84	76	130	206	0.37
85+	41	69	110	0.20
Age group	Male	Female	Total	Percent
0–14	10 101	9 324	19 425	34.99
15–64	16 970	16 857	33 827	60.93
65+	1 093	1 174	2 267	4.08

== Vital statistics ==
=== Registered births and deaths ===
21st-century demography of American Samoa
Year	Population	Live births	Deaths	Natural increase	Crude birth rate	Crude death rate	Rate of natural increase	Total Fertility Rate
2001	59,400	1,655	239	1,416	27.9	4.0	23.9	3.50
2002	60,800	1,629	295	1,334	26.8	4.9	21.9	3.86
2003	62,600	1,608	257	1,351	25.7	4.1	21.6	3.85
2004	64,100	1,713	289	1,424	26.7	4.5	22.2	4.14
2005	65,500	1,720	279	1,441	26.3	4.3	22.0	3.92
2006	66,900	1,442	267	1,175	21.6	4.0	17.6	3.52
2007	68,200	1,293	251	1,042	19.0	3.7	15.3	2.87
2008	69,200	1,338	240	1,098	19.3	3.5	15.8	2.91
2009	70,100	1,375	324	1,051	19.6	4.6	15.0	2.86
2010	67,380	1,279	247	1,032	19.0	3.7	15.3	3.11
2011	64,292	1,287	283	1,004	20.0	4.4	15.6	3.10
2012	63,596	1,175	282	893	18.5	4.4	14.1	2.85
2013	62,610	1,161	270	891	18.5	4.3	14.2	2.61
2014	61,811	1,084	259	825	17.5	4.2	13.3	2.60
2015	60,863	1,096	314	782	18.0	5.2	12.8	2.55
2016	60,200	1,013	280	733	16.8	4.7	12.1	2.69
2017	60,300	1,001	310	691	16.6	5.1	11.5	2.59
2018	59,600	921	298	623	15.5	5.0	10.5	
2019	58,500	840	278	562	14.4	4.8	9.6	
2020	49,841	734	322	412	14.7	6.5	8.2	
2021	51,561	706	331	375	13.7	6.4	7.3	
2022	51,269	706	399	307	13.8	7.8	6.0	
2023	53,331	737	356	381	13.8	6.7	7.1	
2024	53,616	760	360	405	14.2	6.7	7.5	2.29

== Ethnic groups ==
- Pacific Islander 92.6% (includes Samoan 88.9%, Tongan 2.9%, other 0.8%)
- Asian 3.6% (includes Filipino 2.2%, other 1.4%)
- Mixed 2.7%
- Other 1.2% (2010 est.)

== Languages ==
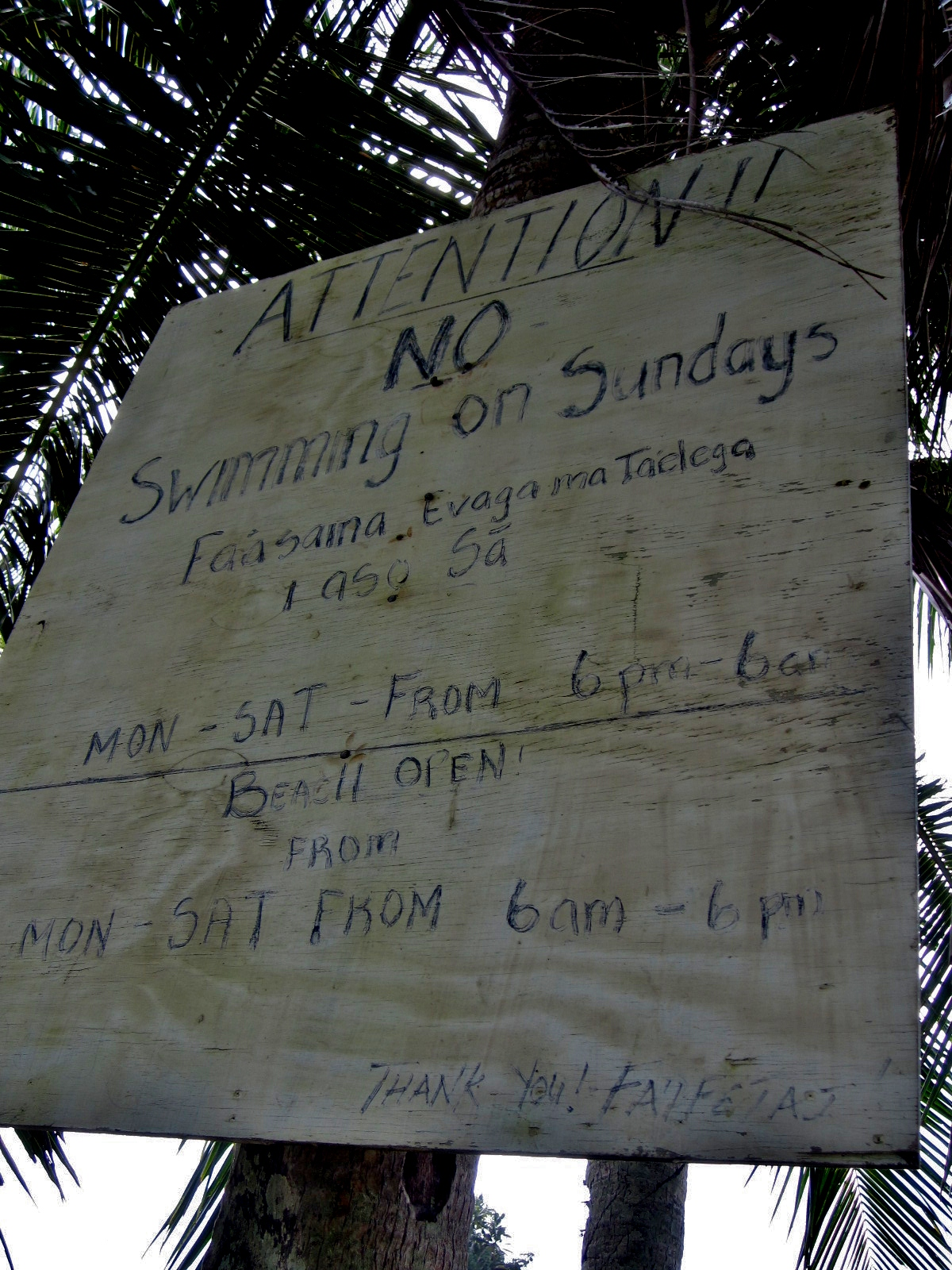
Sign in English and Samoan in American Samoa

Native languages include:

- Samoan 88.6%
- English 3.9%
- Tongan 2.7%
- Other Pacific islander 3%
- Other 1.8% (2010 est.)

English proficiency is very high.

== Religion ==
- Christian 98.3%
- Other 1%
- Unaffiliated 0.7% (2010 est.)

Major Christian denominations on the island include the Congregational Christian Church in American Samoa, the Catholic Church, the Church of Jesus Christ of Latter-day Saints and the Methodist Church of Samoa. Collectively, these churches account for the vast majority of the population.

J. Gordon Melton in his book claims that the Methodists, Congregationalists with the London Missionary Society, and Catholics led the first Christian missions to the islands. Other denominations arrived later, beginning in 1895 with the Seventh-day Adventists, various Pentecostals (including the Assemblies of God), Church of the Nazarene, Jehovah's Witnesses, and the Church of Jesus Christ of Latter-day Saints.

The World Factbook 2010 estimate shows the religious affiliations of American Samoa as 98.3% Christian, other 1%, unaffiliated 0.7%. World Christian Database 2010 estimate shows the religious affiliations of American Samoa as 98.3% Christian, 0.7% agnostic, 0.4% Chinese Universalist, 0.3% Buddhist, and 0.3% Baháʼí.

According to Pew Research Center, 98.3% of the total population is Christian. Among Christians, 59.5% are Protestant, 19.7% are Catholic and 19.2% are other Christians. A major Protestant church on the island, gathering a substantial part of the local Protestant population, is the Congregational Christian Church in American Samoa, a Reformed denomination in the Congregationalist tradition. As of August 2017, The Church of Jesus Christ of Latter-day Saints website claims membership of 16,180 or one-quarter of the whole population, with 41 congregations, and 4 family history centers in American Samoa. The Jehovah's Witnesses claim 210 "ministers of the word" and 3 congregations.
