= Flag of American Samoa =

U.S. territory flag

American Samoa
- Use: Civil and state flag
- Proportion: 1:2
- Adopted: April 17, 1960; 66 years ago
- Design: A red-edged white triangle pointing towards the hoist charged with a bald eagle clutching a war club and a fly-whisk. The white triangle divides the dark blue field into two separate triangles.
- Designed by: Uinifareti Rapi Sotoa

The flag of American Samoa consists of a red-edged white triangle pointing towards the hoist charged with a bald eagle clutching a war club and fly-whisk, with dark blue upper and lower triangles. It was adopted in April 1960 to replace the "Stars and Stripes" as the official flag of the territory. The colors used epitomize the traditional colors of the United States and Samoa.

The bald eagle and the blue, white and red colors symbolize the territory's ties to the United States. The eagle holds a staff and a war club, two traditional symbols of the Samoan chiefs.

According to the flag's designer, Uinifareti Rapi Sotoa, the white section represents the Manuʻa District. The two blue parts represent the two districts on Tutuila Island: The Eastern District and the Western District. The red in the middle is a symbol for the ocean between Tutuila Island and the Manuʻa Islands. The eagle is a confirmation of the unity between the United States and American Samoa. The fue and uatogi carried by the eagle represent the ability of Samoans to compromise but also that they can defend themselves when necessary.

== History ==
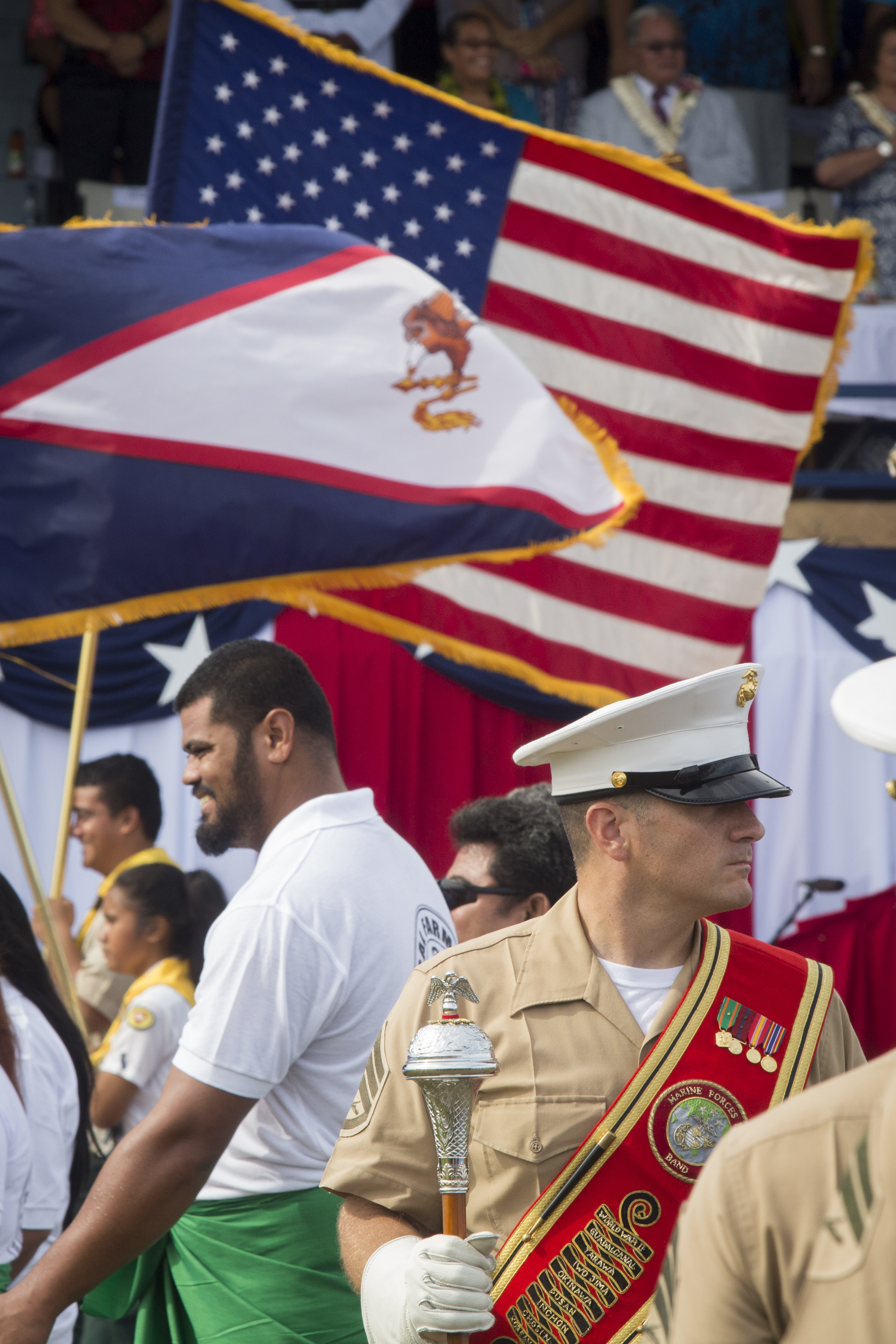
American Samoa flag at a United States Marine Corps Forces, Pacific band performance.

Before the first Europeans set foot on the islands in the 18th century, Samoa did not use any flags. They first utilized flags during the 1800s, although it is unclear which ones were flown due to partial documentation. The islands were contested by Germany, the United Kingdom and the United States at the turn of the century; the three countries resolved the dispute by dividing Samoa amongst themselves during the Tripartite Convention in 1899. As a result of an agreement with the high chiefs of the island of Tutuila, the United States took control over easternmost Samoa on April 17, 1900, and raised their flag that same day. It went on to be the only official flag of American Samoa until 1960.

In the mid-20th century, Samoans began to take a more active role in the local government. Consequently, deliberations began over a new territorial flag and the Samoans were invited to propose ideas. Local government leaders and the U.S. Army Institute of Heraldry then designed the flag while incorporating these ideas into it. The flag was officially adopted April 17, 1960, sixty years to the day the U.S. first raised the American flag over Samoa.

The flag was raised for the first time on Flag Day, April 17, 1960. In the previous year, the flag's design had won the flag design competition at Samoana High School, designed by high school student Fareti Sotoa. A draft was sent to the U.S. Army's Institute of Heraldry.

A copy of the flag, which was brought to the moon by astronauts on four Apollo missions from 1969 to 1971, is on display at the Jean P. Haydon Museum in Pago Pago.

American Samoa holds a Flag Day celebration on April 17 each year.

== Design ==
The flag consists of a large white triangle, pointed towards the hoist, bordered in red and charged with an eagle, all on a blue field. The U.S. national bird holds a yellow uatogi (a war club) in its claws.

The colors and symbols of the flag carry cultural, political, and regional meanings. The red, white and blue represent the colors traditionally utilized by both the United States and Samoa. The bald eagle represents the U.S. and features on the flag, although it does not live in American Samoa. It clutches two Samoan symbols, alluding to the United States' guardianship over American Samoa, as well as evoking the Great Seal of the United States. The symbols are a uatogi (a war club, epitomizing the government's power) and a fue (a fly-whisk, representing the wisdom of traditional Samoan leaders).

== See also ==
- Seal of American Samoa
- Flags of the U.S. states
