= Muriel Smith (singer) =

American opera singer (1923–1985)

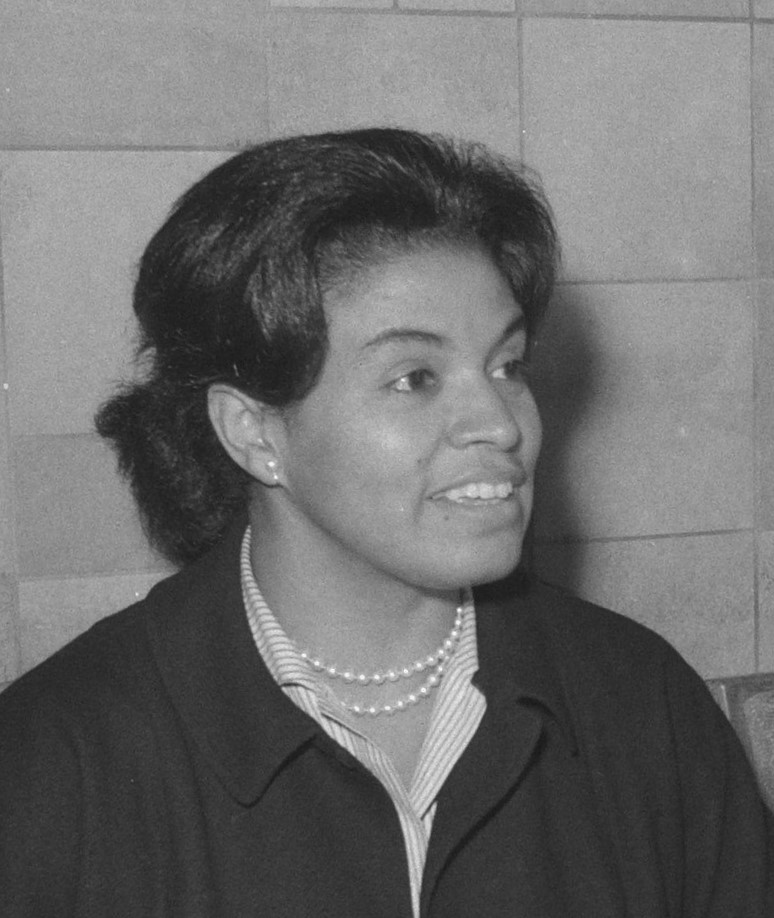
Muriel Smith in 1960

Muriel Burrell Smith (February 23, 1923 – September 13, 1985) was an American singer. In the 1940s and 1950s, she was a star of musical theater and opera, and was also the off-film ghost singer in several hit movies. She is perhaps best known in the UK for her 1953 number 3 hit single "Hold Me, Thrill Me, Kiss Me", which was first covered in 1965 by Mel Carter (and which remains a staple of easy listening and oldies radio to this day) and later in 1994 by Gloria Estefan.

== Biography ==
Smith was born in New York City. Her early life remains obscure. She appeared on the popular radio series Major Bowes' Amateur Hour in 1937. After singing at a cocktail party in 1939, one of the guests, Elizabeth Westmoreland, arranged a scholarship for her at the Curtis Institute of Music in Philadelphia. She was the first African-American to study at Curtis. She worked in a factory, earning $15 per week, to support herself during her studies. She graduated in 1946, in the same class as Leonard Bernstein and Isaac Stern.

She made her début on Broadway in December 1943, taking the title role in Carmen Jones, an updated version of Bizet's Carmen by Billy Rose and Oscar Hammerstein with an African-American cast. At that time, US opera companies were segregated — in the cast of 115, only one had previous Broadway experience. Carmen Jones received a positive critical reception, and ran on Broadway for 14 months. Smith toured with the production until 1947, with two further Broadway revivals.

In 1947, she starred as Delphine with the baritone William Veasey (Joshua Tain) in Theodore Ward's Our Lan at the Royale Theatre. She later appeared in Marc Blitzstein's opera The Cradle Will Rock in 1947/8, and performed with the American Negro Theatre in 1948. She moved to London in 1949. After appearing in two Cecil Landeau revues at the Cambridge Theatre in the West End — Sauce Tartare in 1949 and Sauce Piquante in 1950 — she then performed in the London productions of two Rodgers and Hammerstein musicals at the Theatre Royal, Drury Lane, as Bloody Mary in South Pacific in 1951, and as Lady Thiang, the King's head wife, in The King and I in 1953-1955 with Herbert Lom and Valerie Hobson.

She gave a recital at the Wigmore Hall in 1955 before returning to the US to appear in a revival of Carmen Jones at the New York City Center. On December 17, 1956, she made her début in serious opera, starring as Carmen in a production at the Royal Opera House, Covent Garden. The performance on December 27, 1956 was broadcast live on BBC radio.

Muriel Smith visiting the city of Campinas, Brazil

This was not an unqualified success. In his history of the Royal Opera Harold Rosenthal comments that she was "a lovely figure on stage; a sultry slinky personality with a beautiful velvety voice; but she was tame dramatically and her singing often failed to dominate the stage." Though Covent Garden then had a colourful production and the musical director, Rafael Kubelik, conducted, other members of the cast were also below par, which did not help.

Smith was the uncredited ghost singer for Zsa Zsa Gabor in John Huston's 1952 movie Moulin Rouge, a biography of Toulouse-Lautrec (she also appeared on film as Aicha), and for April Olrich in the 1956 film The Battle of the River Plate.

More significantly, she was ghost singer in two songs for the 1958 Hollywood film version of South Pacific, providing the voice for actress Juanita Hall in for the songs "Bali Ha'i" and "Happy Talk", but she turned down an on-screen part in the 1959 film version of George Gershwin's opera Porgy and Bess, saying "It doesn't do the right thing for my people."

Later in her life, she worked for Moral Re-Armament. In the late 1950s, she starred in the stage musical The Crowning Experience, inspired by the life of Mary McLeod Bethune, which was later made into a film of the same name. She worked as a voice teacher at Virginia Union University. Smith received an arts award from the National Council of Negro Women in 1984. She appeared in several regional theatrical productions, including Equus at Theatre IV in Richmond, Virginia, and the première of Jeraldine Herbison's Sojourner Truth ... Ain't I a Woman? at Hampton University in 1985.

Smith died of cancer in 1985, aged 62, in Richmond, Virginia, having moved there in 1974.

== Partial filmography ==
Year	Title	Role	Notes
1952	Moulin Rouge	Aicha	
1956	The Battle of the River Plate	Dolores, Montevideo	singing voice, uncredited
1958	South Pacific	Bloody Mary	singing voice, uncredited
1960	The Crowning Experience	Emma Tremaine	
1964	Voice of the Hurricane	Mary	
