= Robert Louis Stevenson School =

Schools named "Robert Louis Stevenson School" or similar include:

- Robert Louis Stevenson School, New York City
- Robert Louis Stevenson School, Samoa
- Stevenson School, Pebble Beach, California
