= Sheraton Samoa Aggie Grey's Hotel & Bungalows =

Hotel in Apia, Samoa

Coordinates: 13°49′57.76″S 171°45′34.64″W

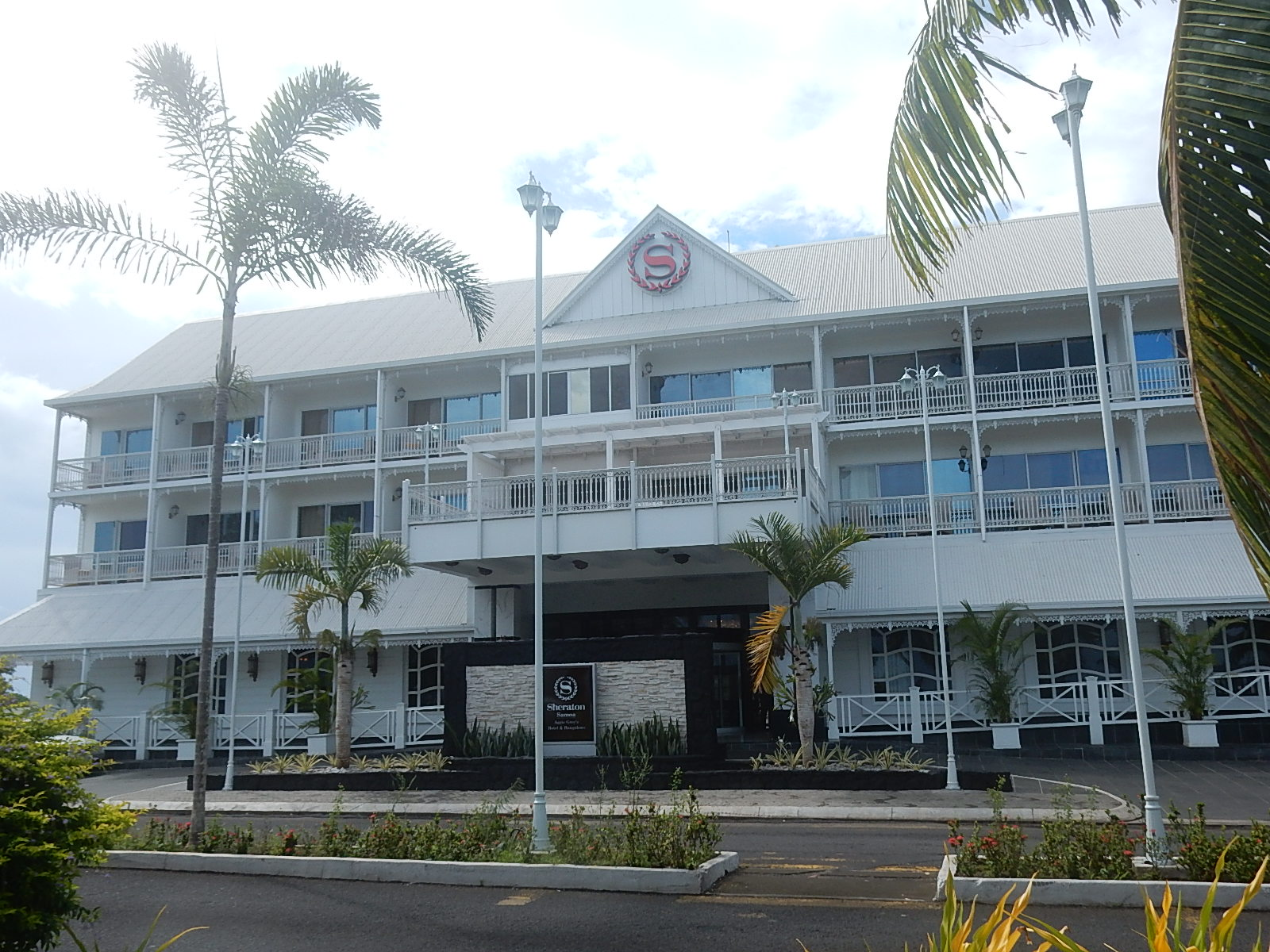
- Front of the hotel in 2016
- Interactive map of the Sheraton Samoa Aggie Grey's Hotel & Bungalows area
- Hotel chain: Sheraton Hotels

General information
- Location: Apia, Samoa, Main Beach Road
- Opening: 1933
- Management: Marriott International

The Sheraton Samoa Aggie Grey's Hotel & Bungalows is a historic hotel in Apia, Samoa.

== History ==
It was opened in 1933 by the Samoan entrepreneur Aggie Grey, and became a popular gathering place for American servicemen stationed in Samoa during World War II. Many notable actors, including Dorothy Lamour, Marlon Brando, Gary Cooper, William Holden, Raymond Burr and Robert Morley stayed at the hotel. It was involved with the production and housing of the crew on the American film production of Return to Paradise (1953) starring Gary Cooper.

The hotel was owned by Grey Investment Group, the company founded by Aggie Grey. Since 2016 it has been part of the Sheraton chain. In 2018 the hotel was sold by New Zealand based real estate agents Gollins Commercial to Chinese investors.

The hotel in Apia is not to be confused with the Sheraton Samoa Beach Resort (formerly named Aggie Grey's Lagoon Beach Resort), on the north west coast of Upolu, 30 kilometres (19 mi) west of Apia.
