= Grey Investment Group =

Samoan tourism company

- Formerly: The British Club; Aggie Grey's Hotel
- Type: Private
- Industry: Tourism
- Founded: 1933; 93 years ago in Apia, Samoa
- Founder: Aggie Grey
- Headquarters: New Aggie Grey's Building, Main Beach Road, Apia, Samoa
- Areas served: Samoa; French Polynesia
- Key people: La’auli Alan Grey (Chairman)
- Services: Resorts
- Owners: Fredrick Alan Grey (50%); Tanya Kathleen Grey (50%)
- Subsidiaries: National Bank of Samoa

Grey Investment Group is a private Samoan tourism company that has assets throughout the Pacific Region. Grey is a dominant company in the Samoan investment market. Some assets are jointly-held with the Government of Samoa; for example, the investments in Virgin Samoa were jointly held with the Government as co-shareholders.

== History ==
=== Early history ===
Grey Investment Group dates back to 1919 when Aggie Grey opened the Cosmopolitan Club in Apia. In 1933 Aggie Grey purchased The British Club using a £200 loan she had received from a close friend. After the purchase 'Aggie's' ; as her businesses were known to be called, ventured into illegal alcohol trading during the Samoan Prohibition on Alcohol by purchasing alcohol from ships passing through Samoa and selling it on to those who enquired. It is commonly believed that Aggie's was not a proper business until the American Forces entered into Apia in 1943 for use as a naval port, when Aggie and the Grey family started selling burgers and coffee for the American soldiers. During this time she also operated sandwich carts throughout Apia. It was said that Marlon Brando was a regular at the hotel when in Samoa.

Aggie's was the set and accommodation for cast and crew for the film "Return to Paradise." Aggie was personally behind the scenes and personally supervised the production of the film. Her hotel was the accommodation and management base for the entire film crew; and day by day, she led the catering unit on location in Lefaga.

=== Aggie's after Cyclone Evan ===
When Cyclone Evan hit Samoa between 11 December and 15 December in 2012, Aggie Greys Hotel was badly damaged and closed for more than 3 years. During the closure, all 300 staff members were employed within other parts of the company, such as, the Apia Bottling, the countless acres of Farmland, Scenic Tours, or the Resort. The family used insurance money as well as money granted by the Central Bank of Samoa and Developmental Bank of Samoa to re-build the hotel.

In August 2013, it was reported that upon re-opening, Sheraton Hotels and Resorts would assume the management role for the hotels. The hotels however would remain under the ownership of the Grey Investment Group.

The hotel was ready to open in April 2016, with the Grand Re-Opening occurring on 30 April. Distinguished guests including President of French Polynesia Edouard Fritch, Head of State of Samoa Tufuga Efi, Prime Minister of Samoa Tuilaepa Aiono Sailele Malielegaoi, and Former Minister of Finance of Samoa Faumuina Tiatia Liuga attended the re-opening.

The total cost of renovations are estimated to be roughly $40 million.

It was reported by Radio New Zealand in May 2017 that Grey Investment Group planned to acquire Manava Beach Resort and Spa, located in French Polynesia; however, the company was passed over, with China's HNA Group eventually acquiring the resort.

=== Receivership ===
The company entered receivership in August 2023. Grant Thornton New Zealand were appointed as receivers.

== Investments ==
=== Aggie Grey's Hotel Limited ===
The Grey Investment Group directly hold 4,039,375 shares, and indirectly hold a further 192,500 shares in Aggie Grey's Hotel Limited, the holding company of both Sheraton-managed Aggie Grey hotels as well as the Le Panina Golf Course & Functions Centre, and the Whitesands Samoa Casino. The shareholding gives the company an 88.53% shareholding in Aggie Grey's Hotel Limited.

Aggie Grey's Hotel Limited owns,

- Sheraton Samoa Aggie Grey's Resort
- Sheraton Samoa Aggie Grey's Hotel & Bungalows
- Whitesands Samoa
- LE Panina Golf Course & Functions Centre

=== Le Méridien ===
In July 2011, General Manager of Grey Investment Group, Fredrick Alan Grey started travelling to Tahiti to meet with then-President of French Polynesia Oscar Temaru, Fidupac Tahiti Representative Jose Chanlin, and the Vice President of GDF Suez France, Frederic Martin, to negotiate the purchase of Le Méridian Tahiti Resort. In December 2011, it was reported that the Grey Family had completed the purchase of Le Méridien for an undisclosed amount. The Grey Family reportedly acquired the resort from French multinational GDF Suez. The transaction was handled by accounting firm Fidupac Tahiti. The Grey Investment Group's website states that the resort was purchased for $15 million.

Le Méridien is a 5-star hotel that features roughly 200 rooms, and was redesigned by award-winning French designer Didier Lefort in 2010. The resort also features two cocktail bars, two restaurants, a spa, and tennis courts. It owns and operates its own private white sand beach and gardens, multiple conference and meeting rooms and is located 15 minutes from Fa'a'ā International Airport.

=== Tahiti Nui Travel ===
In November 2014, it was announced that AccorHotels had appointed JLL Hotels & Hospitality Group to sell their three French Polynesian island resorts in order to focus on existing European investments. Expressions of Interest for the properties closed Wednesday, 26 November 2014.

Senior Vice President of JLL Hotels & Hospitality Group Peter Harper said, "This rare offering presents investors and owner-operators with an unparalleled counter-cyclical opportunity to acquire a large scale presence in this world renowned tourism destination. Located only a short distance from Tahiti, Bora Bora and Moorea boast a level of geographic beauty and overall luxury unrivalled elsewhere."

On 6 March 2016; AccorHotels announced that Grey Investment acquired all three Sofitel-branded resorts in French Polynesia for undisclosed sums. According to the report, Fredrick Grey and Franck Falletta negotiated for over six months regarding the acquisition of the holding company of the resorts, Tahiti Nui Travel. The resorts are operated and managed on a day-by-day basis by AccorHotels. Along with the purchase of the resorts, Tahiti Nui Travel also own the, Tahiti Tours, Tekura Travel Tahiti and Pacific Experience operations. Final Deed of Ownerships were signed 18 November 2016. Through the Tahiti Nui Travel acquisition, Grey Investment acquired an undisclosed minority-shareholding in Air Tahiti Nui.

After the sale, AccorHotels Chief Operating Officer, John Orzinga said, “This deal with the Grey Investment Group highlights our continued capability to attract leading investors in the Pacific region.”

The Sofitel Resorts are;

- Sofitel Bora Bora Private Island
- Sofitel Bora Bora Marara Beach Resort
- Sofitel Moorea Ia Ora Beach Resort Hotel

=== Samoa Scenic Tours ===
Founded in 1967 by the Grey family and two smaller investors. The Grey Family hold multiple stakes in Samoa Scenic Tours & Inbound Services Ltd that account for 1,800 shares (42.86%) of the companies ownership making them the largest shareholder, with the two smaller shareholders owning 1,200 shares (28.57%) each. Samoa Scenic Tours operate in all fields of the Tour industry as they operate coach tours, air charters, cruise ship tours, as well as tailored tours and inter-island tours within the pacific.

Samoa Scenic Tours operate Visitor Information, Domestic Travel Booking and Meet & Greets. They also operate ventures in Accommodation Services and Accommodation Transfers, as well as, Event Management through their Parent company.

=== Other investments ===
- Grey Investment hold a 50.06% shareholding in Apia Bottling Company Ltd. Apia Bottling is responsible for Manufacturing, Importation, and Exporting of all bottled goods in Samoa.
- Grey Investment hold a 20.00% shareholding in Samoa Artisan Water Company Ltd. a High-end bottled water exporter headquartered in Samoa. Large importers include China, New Zealand, and Taiwan.
- Grey Investment own Aggie Grey's Inflight Catering Services; who have contracts to operate Catering Services for Air New Zealand, Thomson Airways, and Icelandair; for their flights leaving Samoa. The company also serves the Royal New Zealand Air Force, Royal Australian Air Force, and Private Charter Airlines.
- Grey Investment own roughly 1.66% of Oceania Gas Ltd. Originally BOC Samoa, merged with BOC Fiji to form Oceania Gas Ltd with the majority owned by Vinod Patel Investments Limited.
- Grey Investment own 2% of Virgin Samoa
- Grey Investment own an undisclosed shareholding in the National Bank of Samoa
- Grey Investment own a multitude of commercial and residential property investments throughout Samoa and New Zealand
- Grey Investment have an undisclosed shareholding in Polynesian Airlines
