= Muriel Smith =

Muriel Smith may refer to:

- Muriel Smith (politician)
- Muriel Smith (singer)
