= Aggie Grey =

Samoan hotelier

- Born: Western Samoa
- Occupation: Hotelier

Aggie Grey (born Agnes Genevieve Swann; 1897–1988) was a Samoan hotelier who founded Grey Investment Group and Aggie Grey's Hotel.

== Biography ==
Grey was born Agnes Genevieve Swann in Western Samoa in 1897, the daughter of William Swann an English chemist and his Samoan wife Pele. In 1903 her mother died and she was raised by her father and later by him and her step mother.

In her adult life she became popular on the Samoan social scene. She founded her hotel in 1933, and became one of Samoa's most popular and well known figures. She hosted many notable actors, including Dorothy Lamour, Marlon Brando, Gary Cooper, William Holden, Raymond Burr and Robert Morley who stayed at her hotel. Her hotel was involved with the production and housing of the crew on the American film production of Return to Paradise (1953) starring Gary Cooper.

Grey died in 1988.

== Personal life and legacy ==
Gray was friends with American writer James Michener and she and her sister Mary Croudace (Aunty Mary) were widely believed to be possible models for his character Bloody Mary that he created in Tales of the South Pacific (1946). The book was adapted into Broadway's musical blockbuster South Pacific (1949) by Rodgers and Hammerstein (collectively known as Rodgers and Hammerstein), and subsequently the 1958 film South Pacific.

Gray's sister Mary Croudace ran "The Casino" a boarding-house in Apia, and was reputed to have been the lover of a Marine general in the war. Mr Croudace, reputed to have been a New Zealand official, was long gone.

Grey is the subject of two biographies by Nelson Eustis and Fay Alailima, was on several postage stamps of Western Samoa, and was a pioneering figure of the Samoan hotel industry.

The Aggie Grey Hotel is now three resorts, two on Upolu island in Samoa, in Apia and Aggie's Lagoon and one resort, Le Méredien in Tahiti. In 2013 Aggie Grey's became part of the Sheraton chain.
