= Sapapaliʻi =

- Village
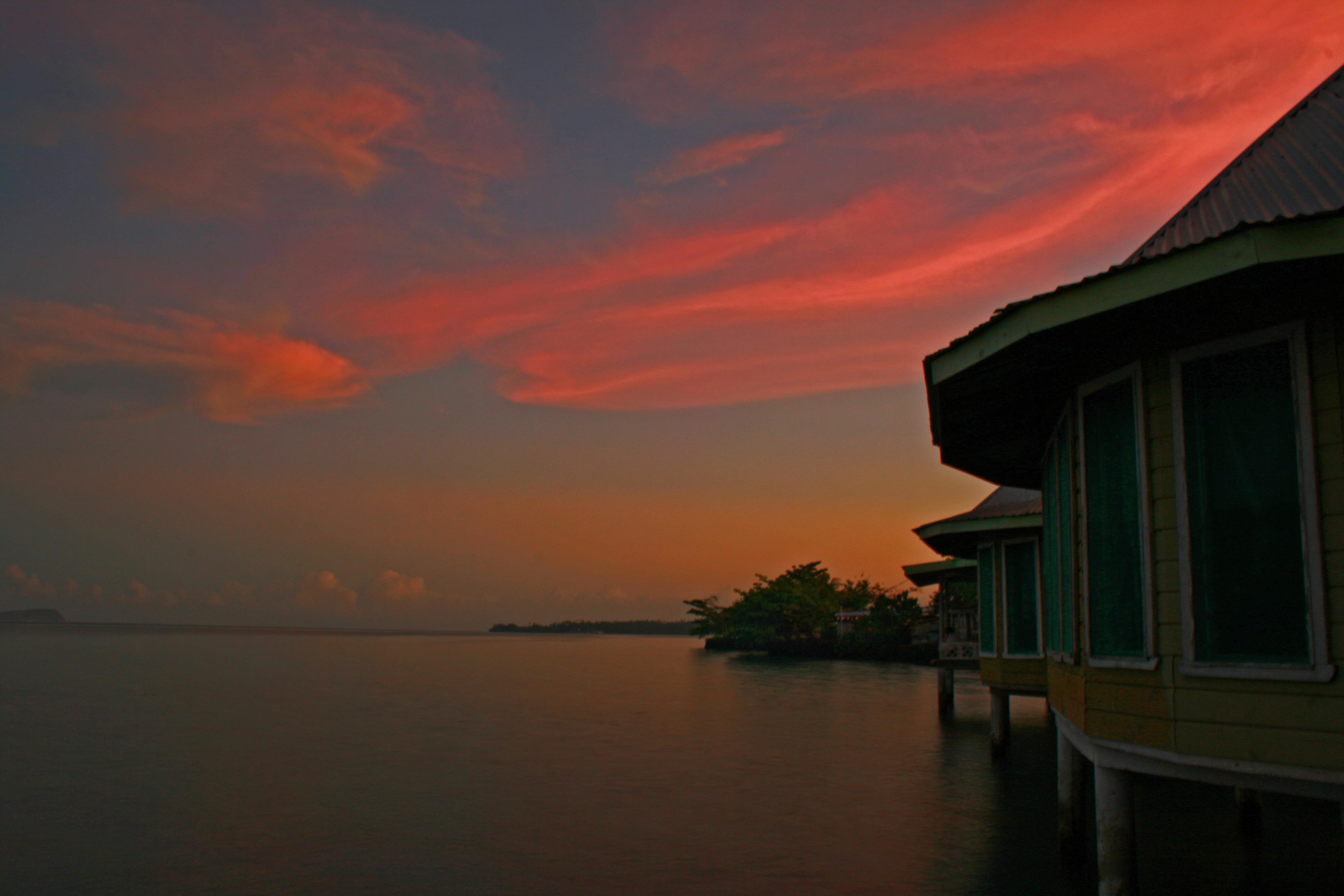
- Sunset at Sapapaliʻi

- Location within Samoa
- Coordinates: 13°41′21″S 172°11′11″W
- Country: Samoa
- District: Faʻasaleleaga

Population (2016)
  - Total: 896
- Time zone: -11

Sapapaliʻi is a village near the southeast coast of Savaiʻi island in Samoa. It is the village where John Williams, the first missionary to bring Christianity to Samoa, landed in 1830. Sapapali'i is in the Fa'asaleleaga political district and has a population of 896.

Sapapaliʻi became the second Malietoa base in the district in 1750 when Malietoa Tiʻa married a woman from the village. Their son Malietoa Fitisemanu was the father of Malietoa Vaiinupo who received Williams in 1830.

Sapapaliʻi is 8 kilometres (5 mi) north of Salelologa ferry terminal and township.

== Archaeology ==
In the 1970s, Gregory Jackmond carried out archaeological surveys inland from Sapapali'i. Jackmond, a Peace Corps in Samoa, surveyed a 20 hectare area with extensive pre-historic settlements. Jackmond later carried out field work at Palauli on the south east coast where the Pulemelei Mound is situated.
