= Tafaigata =

Coordinates: 13°50′44.24″S 171°50′0″W

Tafa'igata is a village in the central region of Upolu island in Samoa. The village population is 998.

Tafa'igata is part of Faleata West Electoral Constituency (Faipule District) which forms part of the larger political district of Tuamasaga.

The area around Tafaigata is also home to the Tafaigata Shooting Range (a venue for the 2007 South Pacific Games), the secondary education campus of the Robert Louis Stevenson School, the Tafaigata prison and a large landfill site.
