= Falemata'aga =

Samoa's national museum

Coordinates: 13°50′2″S 171°45′46″W

- Falemata'aga - Museum of Samoa
- Type: Governmental
- Staff: 3 (2015)

Falemata'aga is the national museum of Samoa. It is housed in a former school which was built by the German colonial administration.

== Background ==
The museum is located in Apia and is housed in the oldest building on the island, which is a former German colonial school. The museum is funded by the Ministry of Education, Sports and Culture and is the only government-funded museum dedicated to Samoan culture. The museum had been part of the Ministry of Youth, Sports & Culture, until 1999, when government departments were reorganised. As of 2015, the museum had three members of staff.

== Collections and research ==
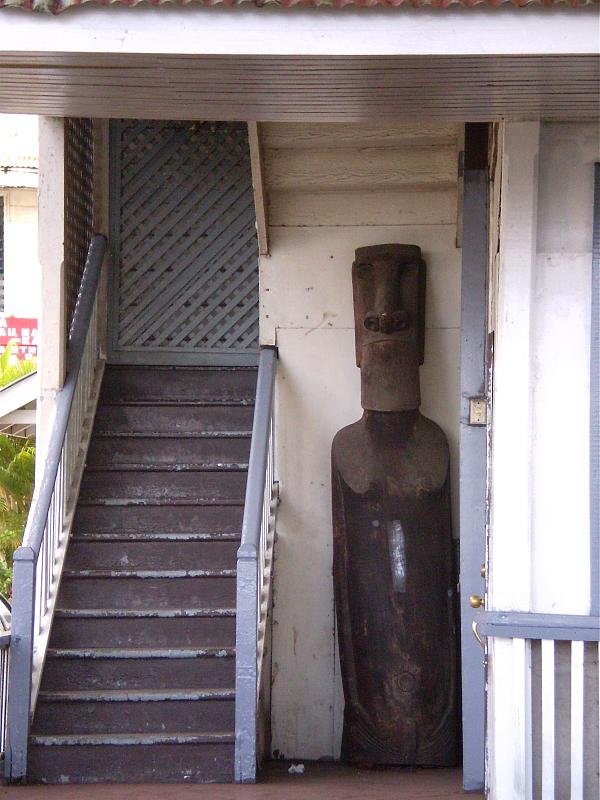
Falemataaga - Museum of Samoa

The museum's collection consists of over three hundred objects, which reflect the four strands of the museum's work: Pacific island cultures; Samoan prehistory; Samoan culture; the environment. Objects include: taxidermy, tattoo equipment, prehistoric pottery, amongst others. As a legacy of colonial occupation of Pacific lands subsequent fascination with their cultures, important Samoan objects and archival materials are held in overseas collections, including: the British Museum; Museum of Applied Arts and Sciences; Hearst Museum of Anthropology; the Metropolitan Museum of Art; Te Papa; the Field Museum, and many others.

The museum also hosts temporary exhibitions on its site, as well as touring displays to more remote areas of the country. In 2013 an exhibition of photographs reflecting German colonial life, entitled 'To Walk Under Palm Trees – The Germans in Samoa' was extremely popular. In 2015 the Auckland War Memorial Museum donated the exhibition Entangled Islands: Sāmoa, New Zealand and the First World War to the museum for display. In 2020 the museum held an exhibition at the Ministry of Education, Sports and Culture, which highlighted Samoa's journey to independence in 1962.

The museum also collaborates on international research projects. During 2013 it worked with the American Museum of Natural History to explore sustainable building techniques in relation to the climate crisis. In 2002 they began a collaboration with Uppsala University to investigate the archaeology and heritage management of the prehistoric Pulemelei mound.
