= Oceania University of Medicine =

Independent Samoa-based medical school

Coordinates: 13°50′47″S 171°45′52″W

- Type: Public-private
- Established: 2002
- Chairman: Taffy Gould
- Vice-Chancellor: Satupaitea (Satu) Viali, BHB, MBChB (Auck), MPH (UNSW), FRACP, FCSANZ, FESC, FACC
- Academic staff: 73
- Students: 380
- Location: Apia, Samoa
- Website: www.oum.edu.ws

Oceania University of Medicine (OUM) is an Independent Samoa-based medical school established in 2002 and operated through a public-private partnership between the Government of Samoa and e-Medical Education, LLC, a Florida-based medical education management company. Its hybrid curriculum of distance-learning preclinicals and face-to-face clinical rotations enrolls 429 students, as of January 2026, and 266 graduates are currently in residency/internship training or practising medicine in numerous global locations, primarily Australia, Canada, Aotearoa New Zealand, Samoa, and the US.

== History ==
The medical school was founded by philanthropist and e-Medical Education's Chairman, Taffy Gould, and included a handful of Samoan and Australian doctors to fill a void: a shortage of physicians in Samoa and the South Pacific.

OUM operates under a charter executed by the Government of Independent Samoa (formerly Western Samoa) and represented by the Prime Minister, as an autonomous statutory corporation. Its authority derives from the Oceania University of Medicine Act, passed by the Legislative Assembly of Samoa in January 2002 and e-Medical Education operates OUM as part of the agreement. Housed on the grounds of the National Hospital Complex in Apia, Samoa, the university formally opened in March 2002 with seven students.

Less than a month after opening, its acting Dean, Professor Don Wilbur, returned to the United States, leaving only a single academic staff member in Samoa. In October 2002 five of the university's students complained that they were not getting the education they had paid for. In 2005 the university was criticised by an Australian Labor MP as offering "worthless" degrees.

In March 2011 Vice-Chancellor Professor Surindar Cheema and most of the staff were terminated by the American operator, without the approval of the university council. In September 2012 the Samoan Government began discussions on a takeover of the university and merging it with the National University of Samoa, which never came to fruition.

In 2014 the university moved into new teaching facilities at the Tupua Tamasese Meaole Hospital (TTM) in Apia.

Due to Samoa's remote location, a distance-learning curriculum evolved with local physician mentors providing clinical training at TTM Hospital, which remains OUM's primary teaching facility. This online curriculum delivery during preclinicals allowed students to study from their home communities and, for many, to continue working during the first two years of the program. That ability to keep working during preclinical studies remains a primary consideration for prospective students. As the program grew, aspiring physicians in other global locations that also experienced physician shortages — as well as those with geographic and personal challenges to attending a traditional medical school — expressed interest in the medical school's program.

=== Mission ===
Oceania University of Medicine is a mission-driven institution and its mission guides its daily activities. The mission has changed little since 2002, although the methods to achieve the mission's goals have matured with each passing year:

"The mission of Oceania University of Medicine (OUM) is to help qualified individuals to overcome distance, personal, and professional barriers to become highly trained medical practitioners, committed to life-long learning with the requisite knowledge, skills, and attitudes to care for patients; to prevent, treat, and cure disease; and to create and apply new knowledge to improve the health of underserved communities in Oceania and beyond."

=== Accreditation ===
As the university grew, following a multi-year process and submission of over 1,000 documents, the medical school sought accreditation from the Philippine Accrediting Association of Schools, Colleges and Universities (PAASCU). Accreditation was granted in 2010, becoming the first internationally accredited medical school in the South Pacific. In 2015, OUM underwent PAASCU's rigorous re-accreditation, was awarded level-two status, and its accreditation was extended through April 2020, then again through 2025. OUM underwent its most recent accreditation review in March 2025, resulting in its extension to May 2030. In April 2024, the World Federation for Medical Education (WFME) granted PAASCU recognition status for its accreditation of OUM in Samoa. This recognition by WFME enables graduates to apply to practise medicine in many countries throughout the world, ensures OUM's global standing, and retains opportunities for its international medical graduates (IMGs), ensuring their degree is globally acknowledged. In 2022–2023, OUM sought advice from the Samoan Qualifications Authority (SQA) regarding accreditation by SQA. PAASCU and the SQA have since signed a Memorandum of Agreement indicating that SQA recognizes PAASCU's accreditation of OUM.

== Governance ==
The university is governed by the OUM Council, a Vice Chancellor and President, a Deputy Vice Chancellor, a Vice President, a Chief Operating Officer, and an Executive Committee made up of two regional Deans, additional senior faculty, and administrative directors.

The following people have held the role of Vice Chancellor, including:

- Dr. Frank Stitt
- Professor Surindar Cheema
- Toleafoa Dr. Viali Lameko (2015–2021)
- Professor Randell Brown (2021 — 2021)
- Professor Hugh Bartholomeusz (2021 — 2022 )
- Professor Athol Mackay (2022 — 2023)
- Asiata Professor Satupaitea Viali (2024 — )

== Admission ==
OUM offers one degree, the Doctor of Medicine (MD). The program admits two new cohorts annually, in January and July.

OUM's is a graduate-entry program, meaning all applicants must have a bachelor's degree or higher from an accredited tertiary institution with a GPA of at least 3.0 on a 4.0 scale, 5.5 on a 7.0 scale, or its equivalent. Neither the Medical College Admission Test (MCAT) nor the Graduate Australian Medical School Admissions Test (GAMSAT) is an admissions requirement at OUM.

OUM currently accepts students from Australia, Canada, Aotearoa New Zealand, Samoa, and the United States (including its territories, such as American Samoa), where the university has well-established relationships with teaching hospitals and clinics and where it is most knowledgeable of the licensing requirements for international medical graduates (IMGs).

== Curriculum ==
The OUM curriculum is divided into pre-clinical, transition, and clinical phases. The pre-clinical phase, typically the first 2 - 2.5 years, is delivered via live, instructor-led virtual classrooms and is offered in one of two pathways, the Standard Pathway, which takes 102 weeks to complete, and the USMLE Pathway of 126 weeks for students intending to practise in the United States.

Before being approved to begin the clinical curriculum, students must pass OUM's Final Pre-Clinical Exam (PCE), complete their Clinical Transition Units, and have the prospectus approved for their required research project. In lieu of the Final PCE, students intending to practise in the United States must pass the United States Medical Licensing Examination (USMLE) Step 1 before they may begin the clinical curriculum, and must pass USMLE Step 2 as a graduation requirement.

OUM's clinical curriculum encompasses 72 weeks of hands-on clinical rotations. As with all traditional medical schools, clinical rotations occur on-site at select teaching hospitals and clinics at a number of global locations, primarily in Australia and the US. Both pathways include a required four-week clinical rotation in Samoa at TTM Hospital.

== Faculty ==
OUM's faculty reflects the diversity of its student body. Largely from Australia and the United States, faculty members are typically "hire-for-service" academics who work collaboratively to deliver a common internationally applicable medical curriculum based on their combined medical education standards. In addition, faculty teach and advise students from global locations ranging from Aotearoa New Zealand and Samoa to Canada, India, Russia, the Caribbean, Sri Lanka and the Philippines. There is considerable focus on understanding and sharing the licensing standards and requirements for the countries where graduates intend to practice.

All faculty have earned MBBS, MD, PhD and other terminal degrees in their fields. Faculty members serve as Lecturers, Advisors, Research Advisors, Course Specialists, Clinical Coordinators, and members of University Leadership.

== Student demographics ==
OUM's students come from 55 different countries, living primarily in Australia, Canada, Aotearoa New Zealand, Samoa and the United States. As of the January 2025 intake, the student body is 59 percent female, 41 percent male, and the average age is 38 years, ranging from 22 to 74 years. Nurses, nurse practitioners and physician assistants are the most common professions stated upon enrolment, followed closely by paramedics and pharmacists. In addition, 42 percent of OUM's incoming students hold master's degrees and 8 percent hold Doctorates.
