= Gregory Jackmond =

Gregory Jackmond is an American who carried out extensive archaeological field work in Samoa during the 1970s.

Jackmond surveyed pre-historic ruins inland from Sapapali'i and another large settlement in Palauli district where the Pulemelei Mound is situated. His work on Savai'i occurred while he was a Peace Corps in the islands.

== See also ==
- Archaeology in Samoa
