= Juanita Hall =

American musical theatre and film actress (1901–1968)

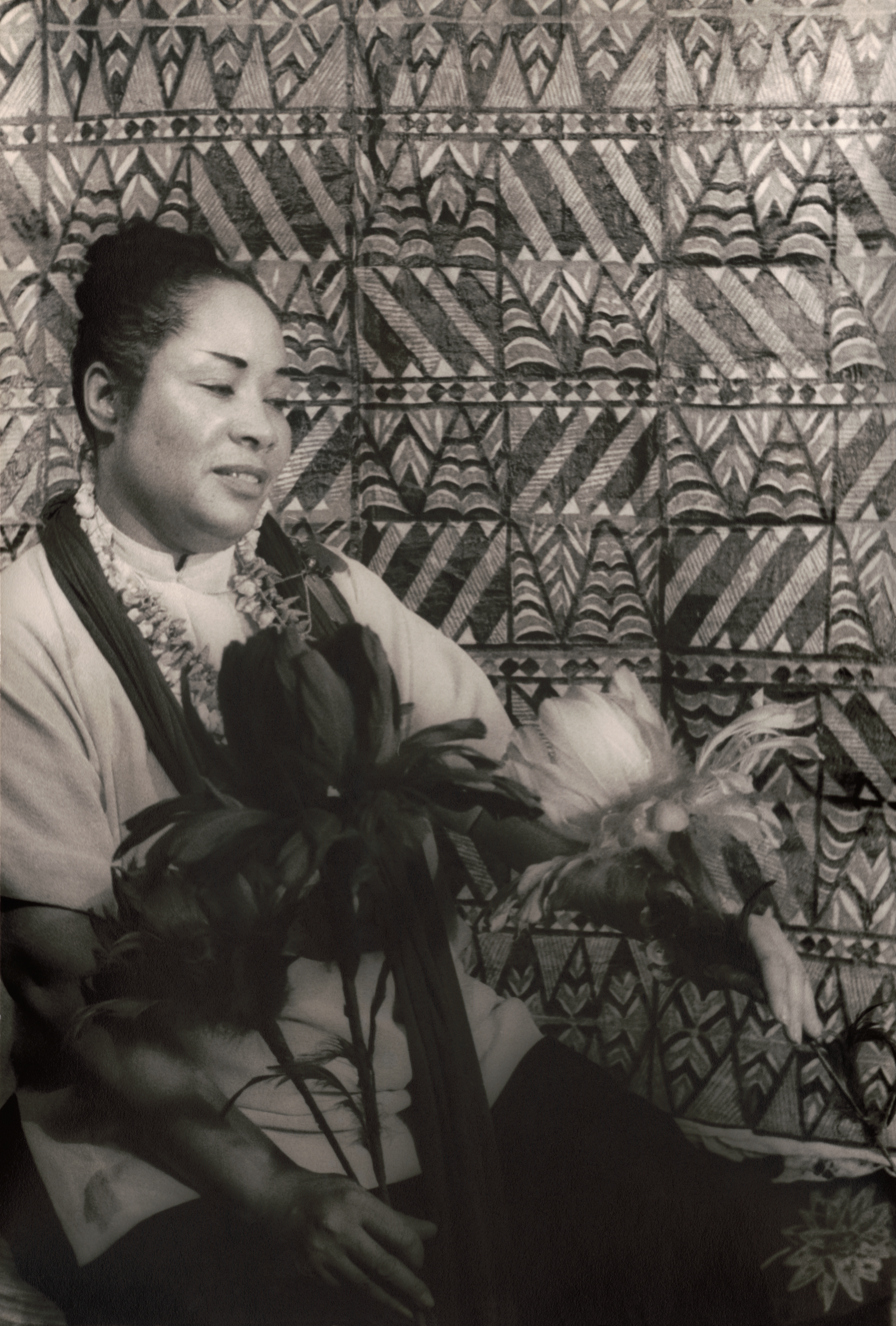
- Juanita Hall playing Bloody Mary in the original production of South Pacific, photographed by Carl Van Vechten
- Born: Juanita Long; November 6, 1901; Keyport, New Jersey, U.S.
- Died: February 29, 1968 (aged 66); Bay Shore, New York, U.S.
- Occupations: Actress and singer
- Years active: 1920s–1960s
- Spouse: Clement Hall

Juanita Hall (née Long, November 6, 1901 – February 29, 1968) was an American musical theatre and film actress. She is remembered for her roles in the original stage and screen versions of the Rodgers and Hammerstein musicals South Pacific as Bloody Mary – a role that garnered her the Tony Award – and Flower Drum Song as Madame Liang.

== Early years ==
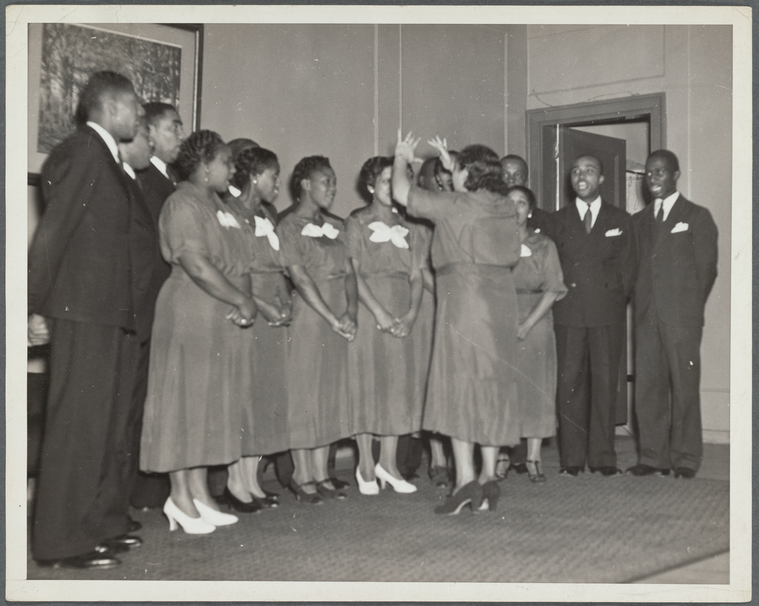
Juanita Hall, with back turned, conducting the Negro Melody Singers.

Born in Keyport, New Jersey, to an African-American father and Irish-American mother, Hall (along with three siblings) was raised by her maternal grandparents after her mother's death. She attended Bordentown Industrial School and graduated from Keyport High School. She also received classical training at the Juilliard School.

== Career ==
Soon after she finished high school, Hall worked in the Lincoln settlement house in East Orange, New Jersey, teaching music to children during the day and to an adult chorus at night.

In the early 1930s, she was a special soloist and assistant director for the Hall Johnson Choir. A leading black Broadway performer in her day, she was personally chosen by Richard Rodgers and Oscar Hammerstein II to perform the roles she played in the musicals South Pacific and Flower Drum Song, as a Tonkinese woman and a Chinese-American, respectively.

In 1950, she became the first African American to win a Tony Award for Best Supporting Actress for her role as Bloody Mary in South Pacific starring Ezio Pinza and Mary Martin. She also won a Donaldson Award for playing that role. She played the role for 1,925 performances on Broadway at the Majestic Theatre beginning on April 7, 1949. She also starred in the 1954 Broadway musical House of Flowers in which she sang and danced Harold Arlen's Slide Boy Slide. In addition to her role in South Pacific, she was a regular performer in clubs in Greenwich Village, where she captivated audiences with her renditions of "Am I Blue?", "Lament Over Love", and Langston Hughes' "Cool Saturday Night".

Before her acting roles, she assembled her own chorus group, The Juanita Hall Choir, and kept busy with performances in concert, on records, in films, and on the air. She auditioned for Talent 48, a private review created by the Stage Manager's Club. Later, she performed on radio in the soap opera The Story of Ruby Valentine on the National Negro Network. The serial was broadcast on 35 stations, and sponsors of the broadcast included Philip Morris and Pet Milk.

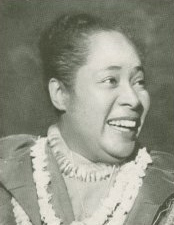
As Bloody Mary in the theatrical run of South Pacific

In 1958, she recorded Juanita Hall Sings the Blues (at Beltone Studios in New York City), backed by a group of jazz musicians that included Claude Hopkins, Coleman Hawkins, Buster Bailey, Doc Cheatham, and George Duvivier. In 1958, she reprised Bloody Mary in the film version of South Pacific, for which her singing part was dubbed. "Rodgers decreed her vibrato was now frayed, so her songs would be dubbed by Muriel Smith, Broadway's original Carmen Jones." Smith had played the role in the London production. (Music director Alfred Newman and director Joshua Logan thought that it was unnecessary to dub her.) The same year, Hall starred in Flower Drum Song, another Broadway show by Rodgers and Hammerstein. She also toured in the road show version of Flower Drum Song, but she had to leave it in early 1962 because of illness.

== Personal life ==
Hall married actor Clement Hall while in her teens, when they both were performing in the Broadway production Lew Leslie's Blackbirds. They had no children and eventually were divorced.

In her later years, diabetes led to blindness. As she had little money, the Actors Fund of America supported her in its Lillian Booth Actors Home in Englewood, New Jersey, and in hospitals when she needed treatment.

Hall was Catholic.

== Death ==
Hall died at Southside Hospital, Bay Shore, New York, from complications of diabetes. She had been living at the Percy William Actors' Home in East Islip, New York.

== Partial filmography ==
- Paradise in Harlem (1939) – Singer in Audience
- Miracle in Harlem (1948) – Juanita Hall – Specialty 'Chocolate Candy Blues'
- Harlem Follies of 1949 (1950)
- South Pacific (1958) – Bloody Mary
- Flower Drum Song (1961) – 'Auntie' Liang (final film role)

== Sources ==
- Time writers (6 June 1949). "After 21 Years". Time. Archived from the original on January 18, 2010.
- "Juanita Hall, Great Singer, Great Actress". African American Registry. 2008. Archived from the original on 2008-04-18.
