= Bali Ha'i =

Song
- Released: 1949 in South Pacific
- Genre: Showtune
- Composer: Richard Rodgers
- Lyricist: Oscar Hammerstein II

"Bali Ha'i", also spelled "Bali Hai", is a show tune from the 1949 Rodgers and Hammerstein musical South Pacific. The name refers to a mystical island, visible on the horizon but not reachable, and was originally inspired by the sight of Ambae island from neighboring Espiritu Santo in Vanuatu, where author James Michener was stationed in World War II.

== In South Pacific ==
In the musical, Bali Ha'i is a volcanic island within sight of the island on which most of the action takes place. The troops think of Bali Ha'i as an exotic paradise, but it is off-limits—except to officers. Bali Ha'i's matriarch, Bloody Mary, conducts much business with the troops, and she meets Lt. Joseph Cable soon after he arrives. She sings to him her mysterious song "Bali Ha'i", with its haunting orchestral accompaniment, because she wants to entice him to visit her island. She doesn't tell him that she wants him to meet, and fall in love with, her young daughter Liat.

== Resemblance to score for Bride of Frankenstein ==
Several commentators have noted that the opening melody of "Bali Ha'i" bears a resemblance to the "bride motif" in Franz Waxman's musical score for the 1935 film Bride of Frankenstein. The two melodies share a three-note pattern.

== Cover versions ==
Several versions of the show tune made the best sellers charts in 1949. Perry Como's version was the most successful at #5. Other versions appearing on the charts were by Paul Weston and his Orchestra (#10), Bing Crosby (recorded March 10, 1949) (#12), Peggy Lee (#13), and Frank Sinatra (#18). Later, Harry James released a version on his 1955 album, Jazz Session (Columbia CL 669); Andy Williams released a version on his 1958 album, Andy Williams Sings Rodgers and Hammerstein; and Sergio Franchi included this song on his 1965 RCA Victor tribute to The Songs of Richard Rodgers. The Meat Puppets played the song live starting in the late 1980s, eventually releasing it as a B side to their single "Sam" in 1991.

== Connections to actual islands ==
"Bali Ha'i" was based on the real island of Ambae (formerly Aoba Island). Ambae is located in Vanuatu (known as New Hebrides at the time the song was written).

Ambae is visible on the horizon from Espiritu Santo island, where James A. Michener was stationed in World War II. Michener referred to the island in his book, Tales of the South Pacific, which is the basis for the musical South Pacific. The author used the tranquil, hazy image of the smoothly sloping island on the horizon to represent a not-so-distant but always unattainable place of innocence and happiness. Hence the longing nature of the song. In his memoir, The World Is My Home (1992), Michener writes of his time in the Treasury Islands: "On a rude signboard attached to a tree, someone had affixed a cardboard giving the settlement's name, and it was so completely different from ordinary names, so musical to my ear that I borrowed a pencil and in a soggy notebook jotted the name against the day when I might want to use it for some purpose I could not then envisage: Bali-ha'i."

In the 1958 film adaptation, Bali Ha'i is portrayed by the real-life island of Tioman in Malaysia. However, the scene was filmed on the north shore of Kauaʻi; Mount Makana was used as Bali Hai and is known as Bali Hai. Tunnel's Beach is often referred to as "Nurses' Beach", and the scene where Bloody Mary sings "Bali Ha'i" is set on Hanalei Bay.

== Influence on popular culture ==
Mr. Bali Hai is the name of a mixed drink that originated at the Bali Hai restaurant on Shelter Island in San Diego, California.

The song is used in an episode of 3rd Rock From the Sun in which Tommy has a dream about his choir teacher singing the song seductively to him while Sally, Dick, and Harry call to him from a boat a very long way out at sea.

"Bali Ha'i" is the sixth episode of the second season of the American television drama series Better Call Saul, a spinoff prequel to Breaking Bad. In the episode, main character Jimmy McGill sings the song over the phone to Kim Wexler.

The song is played in the background during a dinner scene at the beginning of the 1999 film American Beauty.

Bali Hai is the brand name for a beer produced by Bali Hai Brewery in Indonesia.

Italian Swiss Colony produced the "pop wine" Bali Hai in the 20th century.

New Zealand comedian/writer Barry Crump referred to the Baháʼí Faith as "Bali Ha'i" while describing his conversion to the religion in his autobiography The Life and Times of a Good Keen Man (1992).
