= Letogo =

Samoan village

Letogo is a village on the central north coast of Upolu island in Samoa. Letogo is situated east of the capital Apia.

The village is part of the electoral constituency (Faipule District) Vaimauga East which forms part of the larger political district of Tuamasaga.

The population of Letogo is 1273.

Tuliaupupu is the High Chief of Letogo.
