= Vaisigano River =

Location
- Country: Samoa

Physical characteristics
- Source
  - location: Slopes of Mount Le Pu'e
  - coordinates: 13°55′47″S 171°45′05″W
  - elevation: 860 metres (2,820 ft)
- Mouth
  - coordinates: 13°49′53″S 171°45′37″W
  - elevation: 0.0 metres (0 ft)
- Length: 11.5 km (7.1 mi)

The Vaisigano River is a river on Upolu, one of the two main islands of Samoa. It is one of several rivers and streams which flow through the nation's capital, Apia. The river has three main branches, all of which have their sources in the central volcanic ridge which runs the length of the island. The main (central) branch of the river rises on the northern slopes of Mount Le Pu'e, and joins with the eastern branch 4 km south of central Apia. The western branch joins one kilometre further north.

The main cross-island road, which runs from Apia to Si'umu, runs along a ridge overlooking the western branch's valley for part of its length; the settlements of Leaoa, Tiapapata, Letava, and Vaoala, which lie along the highway, are all therefore close to the river's course, as is Avele College, one of Samoa's main educational institutes. The waters of the river are used by the Alaoa Water Treatment Plant and power station, which supplies both water and electricity to Apia.
