= National Bank of Samoa =

Bank based in Apia, Samoa

Coordinates: 13.8347°S 171.7624°W

- Type: Public
- Industry: Financial services
- Founded: 1996
- Headquarters: Apia, Samoa
- Area served: Samoa
- Products: Banking, financial and related service

The National Bank of Samoa is a locally owned and private bank in Samoa. Established in 1994, it is the first completely locally owned private commercial bank in the country. It is one of four commercial banks in Samoa, along with international banks ANZ Bank Samoa and Bank of South Pacific and local Samoa Commercial Bank.

== History ==
Creation of the bank was proposed in March 1994 by Luamanuvae Dick Meredith, a successful Samoan businessman, matai and entrepreneur. In November of that year a banking license was sought and granted on 27 February 1995. The bank officially opened its doors as the National Bank of Samoa Ltd on 11 December 1996.

The founding chairman was Muagututi’a George Meredith. The current chairman is Fanene Samau Etuale Sefo.

In 2015, it had a 16% share of the market, behind the two foreign banks and Samoa Commercial Bank. In 2016 the bank celebrated its 20th anniversary.

On 11 October 2018, the bank announced the launch of its new digital banking product, EziBank™, which allows users to access their accounts by mobile phone. On 14 February 2019, it announced that internet banking would be available to its customers beginning the next day. On 18 October 2024, it opened its sixth branch, at Faleolo International Airport. In addition, it provides mobile banking caravans to service rural areas.

The National Bank of Samoa is still 100% locally owned and has seen a significant period of growth.
