= Apia =

Capital of Samoa

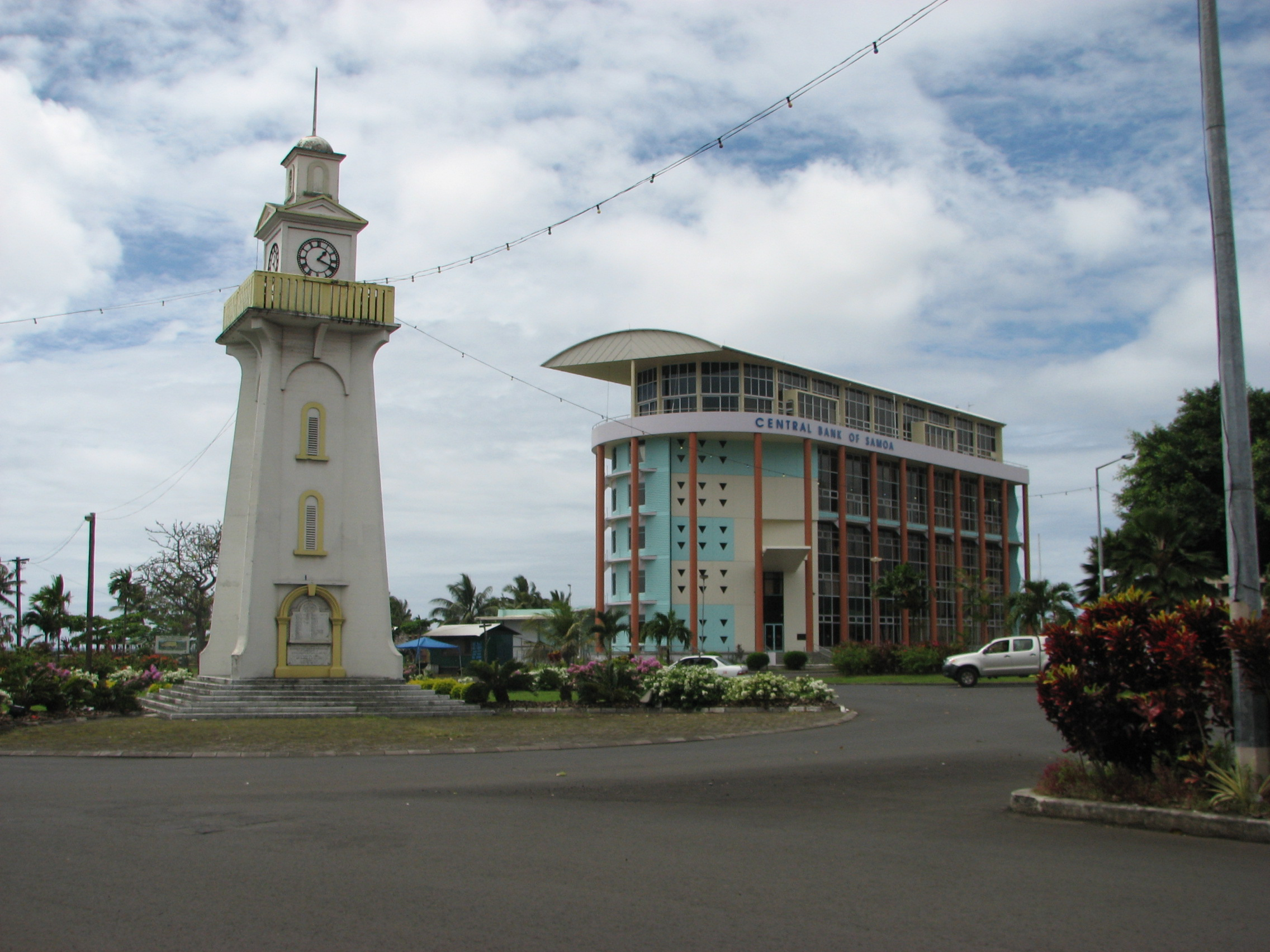
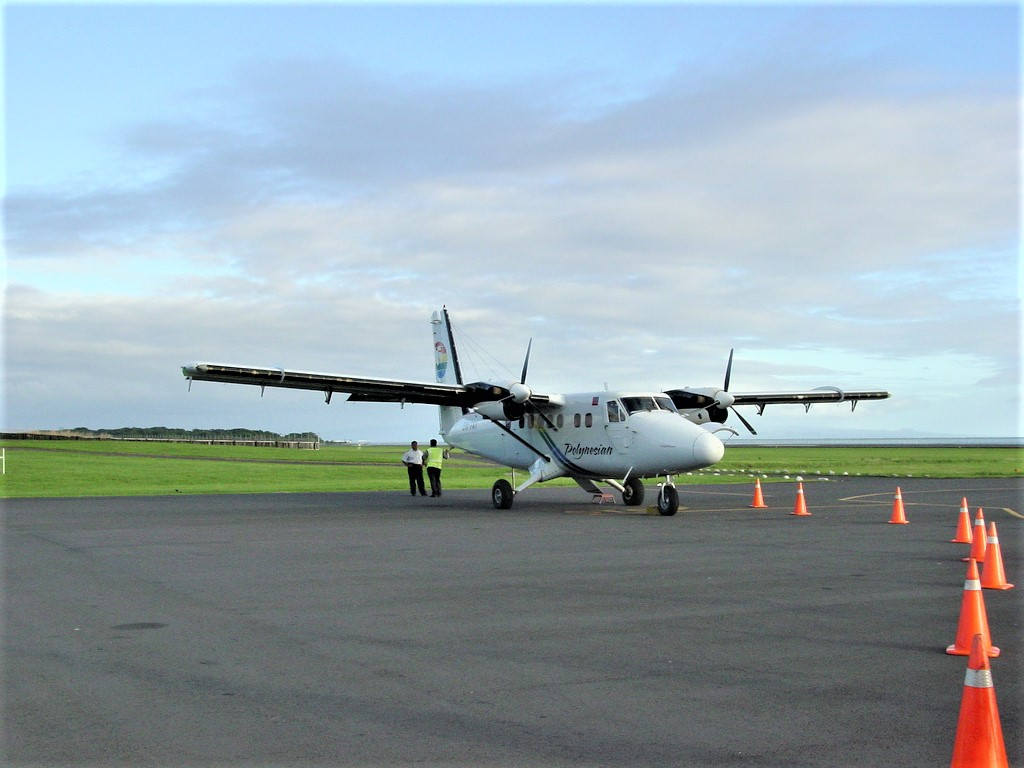
- Government Building in Apia Central Bank of Samoa Faleolo International Airport The Immaculate Conception Cathedral of Apia

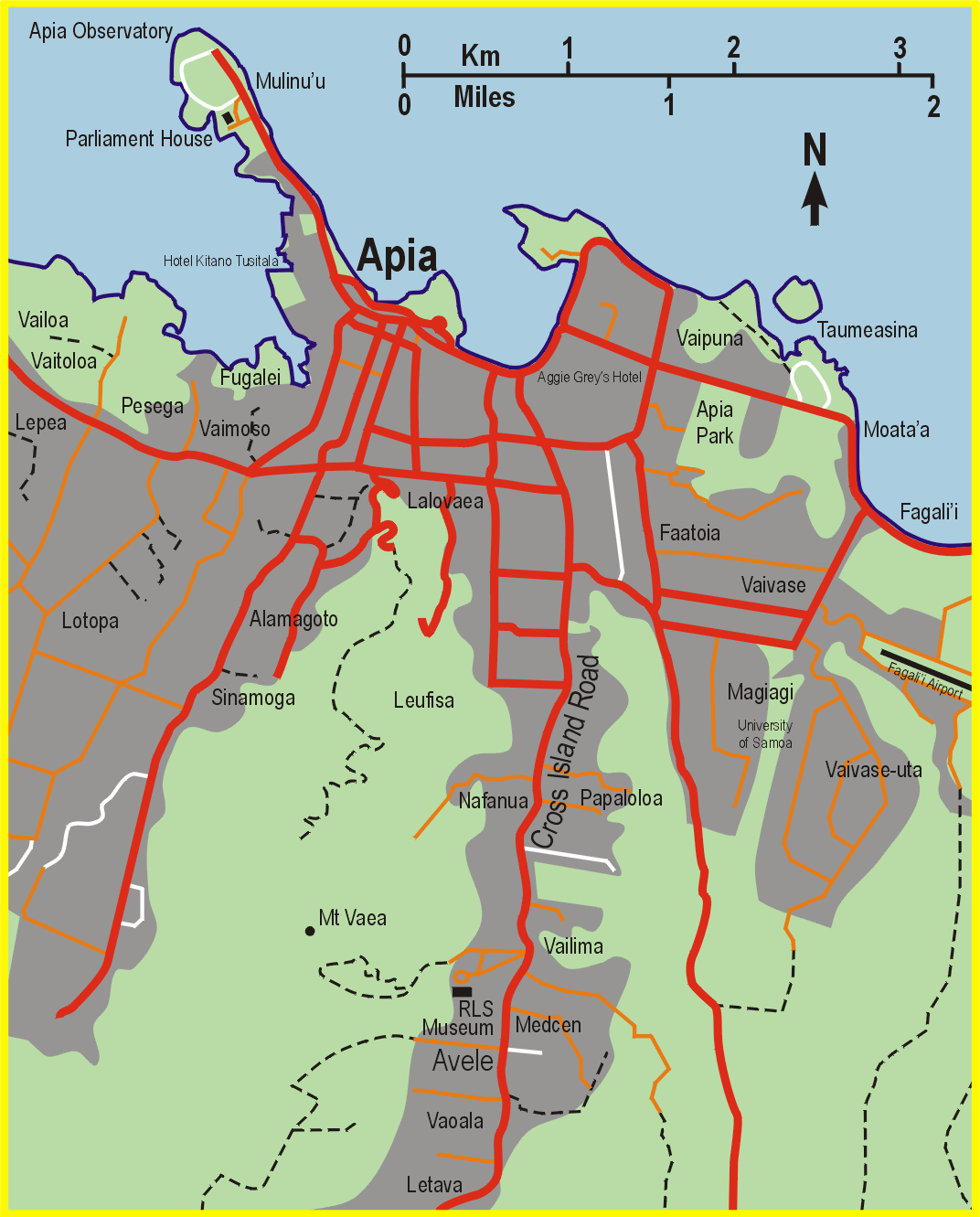
- Map of Apia

- Location in Samoa
- Coordinates: 13°50′S 171°45′W
- Country: Samoa
- District: Tuamasaga
- Constituency: Vaimauga West and Faleata East
- Founded: 1850s
- Became Capital: 1959

Area
  - City: 47.80 sq mi (123.81 km^{2})
  - Urban: 20.0 sq mi (51.8 km^{2})
- Elevation: 6.6 ft (2 m)

Population (2021)
  - City: 35,974
  - Density: 752.54/sq mi (290.56/km^{2})
  - Urban: 35,974
  - Urban density: 1,800/sq mi (694/km^{2})
- Time zone: UTC+13 (WST)
- Climate: Af

Apia (Samoan: [a.pi.a]) is the capital and largest city of Samoa. It is located on the central north coast of Upolu, Samoa's second-largest island. Apia falls within the political district (itūmālō) of Tuamasaga.

The Apia Urban Area (generally known as the City of Apia) has a population of 35,974 (2021 census). Its geographic boundaries extend from the east approximately from Letogo village in Vaimauga to the west in the newer, industrialized region of Apia which extends to Vaitele village in Faleata.

== History ==
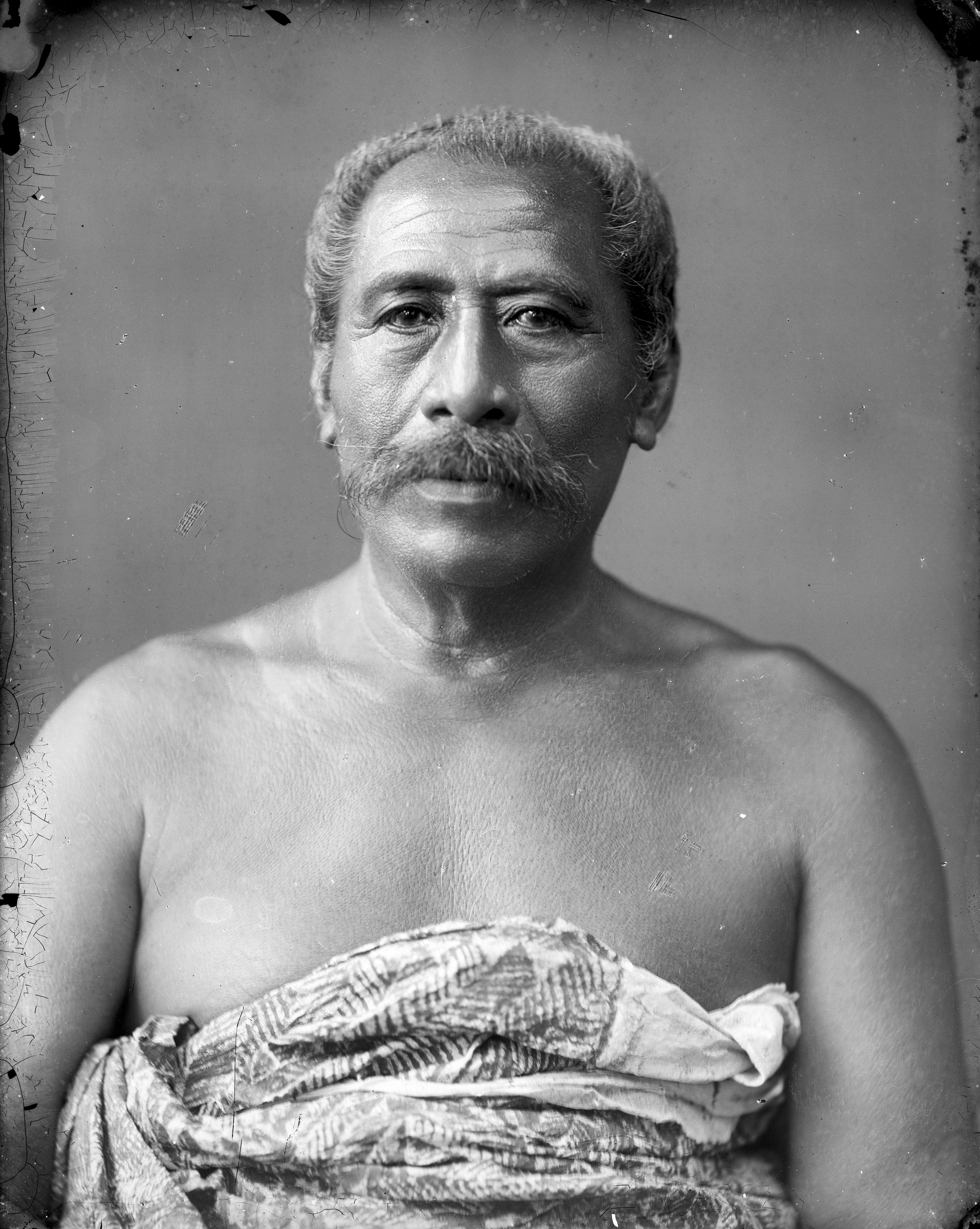
A high chief of Apia, Seumanutafa Pogai, c. 1890

Apia was originally a small village (the 1800 population was 304), from which the country's capital took its name. Apia Village still exists within the larger modern capital of Apia, which has grown into a sprawling urban area that encompasses many villages. Like every other settlement in the country, Apia Village has its own matai (leaders) and fa'alupega (genealogy and customary greetings) according to fa'a Samoa.

The modern city of Apia was founded in the 1850s, and it has been the official capital of Samoa since 1959. Seumanutafa Pogai was high chief until his death in 1898.

The harbour was the site of a notorious 15 March 1889 naval standoff in which seven ships — from Germany, the US, and Britain — refused to leave the harbour, even though a typhoon was clearly approaching, lest the first one to move lose face. All the ships sank or were damaged beyond repair, except for the British cruiser Calliope, which managed to leave port, travelling at a rate of one mile per hour, and was able to ride out the storm. Nearly 200 American and German people died.

Western Samoa was ruled by Germany as German Samoa from 1900 to 1914, with Apia as its capital. In August 1914, the Occupation of German Samoa by an expeditionary force from New Zealand began. New Zealand governed the islands (as the Western Samoa Trust Territory) from 1920 until Samoan independence in 1962 – first under a League of Nations Class C Mandate and then, after 1945, as a United Nations Trust Territory.

The country underwent a struggle for political independence in the early 1900s, organised under the aegis of the national Mau movement. During this period, the streets of Apia were the site of non-violent protests and marches, in the course of which many Samoans were arrested. On what became known as "Black Saturday" (28 December 1929), during a peaceful Mau gathering in the town, the New Zealand constabulary killed the paramount chief Tupua Tamasese Lealofi III.

During World War II the United States Navy built and operated Naval Base Upolu from 1941 to 1944.

== Geography ==
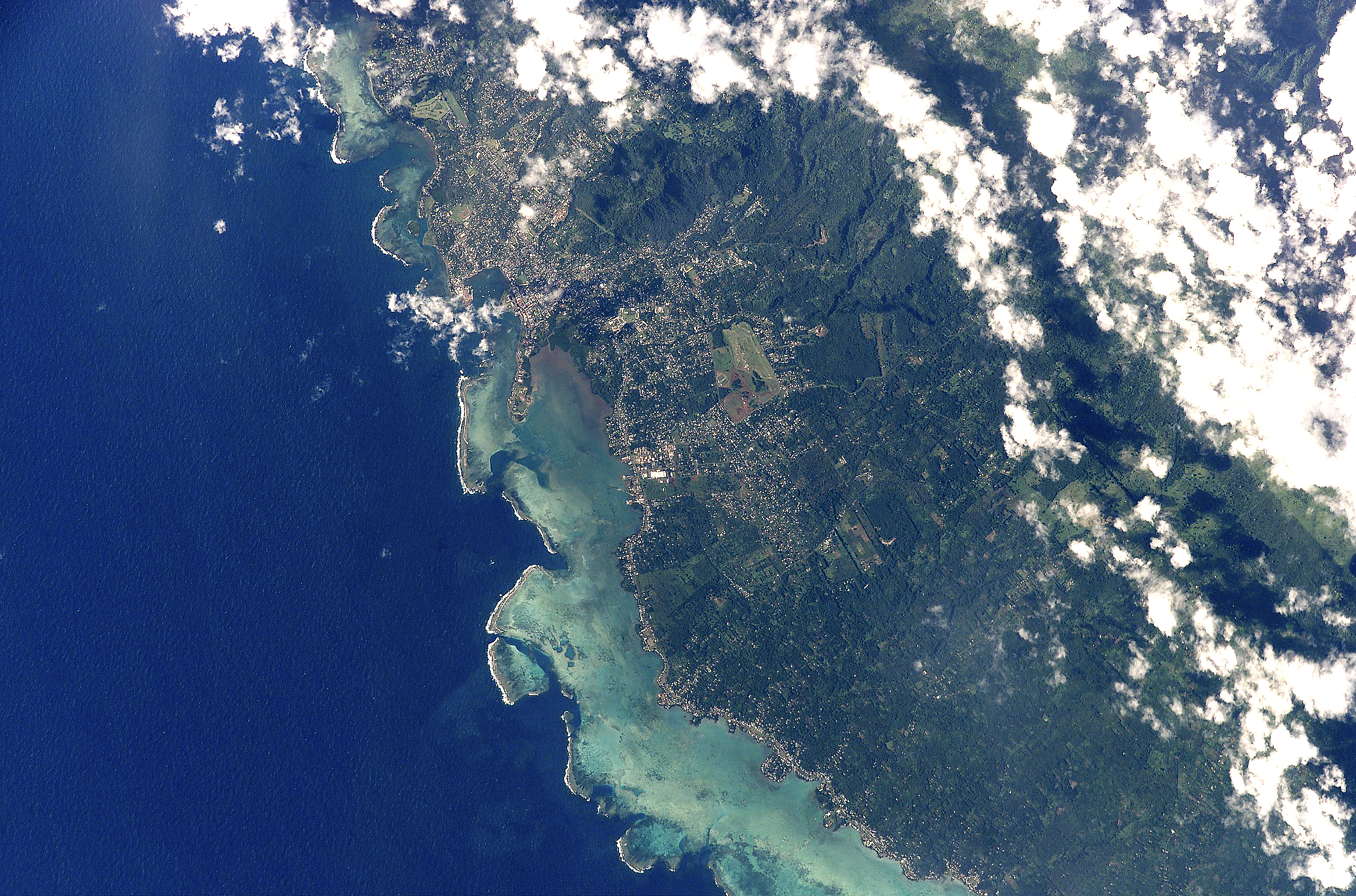
Orbital view of Apia (on 16 June 2002, from STS-111).

Apia is situated on a natural harbour at the mouth of the Vaisigano River. It is on a narrow coastal plain with Mount Vaea (elevation 472 metres (1,549 ft)), the burial place of writer Robert Louis Stevenson, directly to its south. Two main ridges run south on either side of the Vaisigano River, with roads on each. The more western of these is Cross Island Road, one of the few roads cutting north to south across the middle of the island to the south coast of Upolu.

== Climate ==
Apia features a tropical rainforest climate (Af according to the Köppen climate classification) with consistent temperatures throughout the year. Nevertheless, the climate is not equatorial because the trade winds are the dominant aerological mechanism and besides there are a few cyclones. Apia's driest months are July and August when on average about 80 millimetres (3.1 in) of rain falls. Its wettest months are December to March when average monthly precipitation easily exceeds 300 millimetres (12 in). Apia's average temperature for the year is 26 °C (79 °F). Apia averages roughly 3,000 millimetres (120 in) of rainfall annually.

Climate data for Apia (Elevation: 2 m or 6.6 ft) (1991–2020 normals, extremes 1971–2020)
Month	Jan	Feb	Mar	Apr	May	Jun	Jul	Aug	Sep	Oct	Nov	Dec	Year
Record high °C (°F)	36.2 (97.2)	34.6 (94.3)	35.2 (95.4)	36 (97)	37.6 (99.7)	34.7 (94.5)	33.7 (92.7)	35.9 (96.6)	35.3 (95.5)	34.8 (94.6)	34.9 (94.8)	35.1 (95.2)	37.6 (99.7)
Mean daily maximum °C (°F)	30.6 (87.1)	30.8 (87.4)	30.9 (87.6)	31.1 (88.0)	30.6 (87.1)	30.2 (86.4)	29.8 (85.6)	29.8 (85.6)	30 (86)	30.2 (86.4)	30.5 (86.9)	30.7 (87.3)	30.4 (86.8)
Daily mean °C (°F)	27.6 (81.7)	27.7 (81.9)	27.7 (81.9)	27.8 (82.0)	27.3 (81.1)	27.1 (80.8)	26.6 (79.9)	26.6 (79.9)	26.8 (80.2)	27 (81)	27.4 (81.3)	27.5 (81.5)	27.3 (81.1)
Mean daily minimum °C (°F)	24.5 (76.1)	24.6 (76.3)	24.5 (76.1)	24.5 (76.1)	24 (75)	23.9 (75.0)	23.5 (74.3)	23.4 (74.1)	23.6 (74.5)	23.9 (75.0)	24.2 (75.6)	24.4 (75.9)	24.1 (75.3)
Record low °C (°F)	16.2 (61.2)	19.5 (67.1)	20.7 (69.3)	19.5 (67.1)	14.9 (58.8)	17.6 (63.7)	17.9 (64.2)	18.1 (64.6)	17.5 (63.5)	19.4 (66.9)	18.9 (66.0)	19.5 (67.1)	14.9 (58.8)
Average precipitation mm (inches)	482.8 (19.01)	406.3 (16.00)	302 (11.9)	231.8 (9.13)	244.6 (9.63)	139.2 (5.48)	132.8 (5.23)	112.3 (4.42)	143.3 (5.64)	220.7 (8.69)	260.5 (10.26)	413.7 (16.29)	3,090 (121.68)
Average precipitation days (≥ 1.0 mm)	20.5	18.4	18.1	13.9	13.2	10.1	10.7	9.9	12	13.1	15.5	17.8	173.2
Mean monthly sunshine hours	149	160	173	186	193	197	213	219	207	199	181	154	2,230
Source 1: World Meteorological Organization
Source 2: World Bank (sunshine 1971–2000)

== Administration ==
Tui Atua Tupua Tamasese Efi government building.

Apia is part of the Tuamasaga political district and of election district Vaimauga 1,2,3,4 and Faleata 1,2, and 3. There is no city administration for Apia, as it consists of some 45 individual, independent traditional and freehold villages. Apia proper is just a small village between the mouths of the Vaisigano (east) and Mulivai (west) rivers, and is framed by Matautu and Vaiala traditional villages. Together with several freehold villages (no traditional village council), these 45 villages constitute "Downtown Apia".

The Planning and Urban Management Act 2004 was passed by parliament to better plan for the urban growth of Samoa's built-up areas, with particular reference to the future urban management of Apia. The city's historical haphazard growth from village to colonial trading post to the major financial and business centre of the country has resulted in major infrastructural problems in the city. Problems of flooding are commonplace in the wet season, given the low flood-prone valley that the city is built on. In the inner-city village of Sogi, there are major shoreline pollution and effluent issues given that the village is situated on swamplands. The disparate village administrations of the Apia Urban Area has resulted in a lack of a unified and codified legislative approach to sewage disposal. The significant increase in vehicle ownership has resulted in traffic congestion in the inner city streets and the need for major projects in road-widening and traffic management. The PUMA legislation sets up the Planning Urban Management Authority to manage better the unique planning issues facing Apia's urban growth.

== City features ==
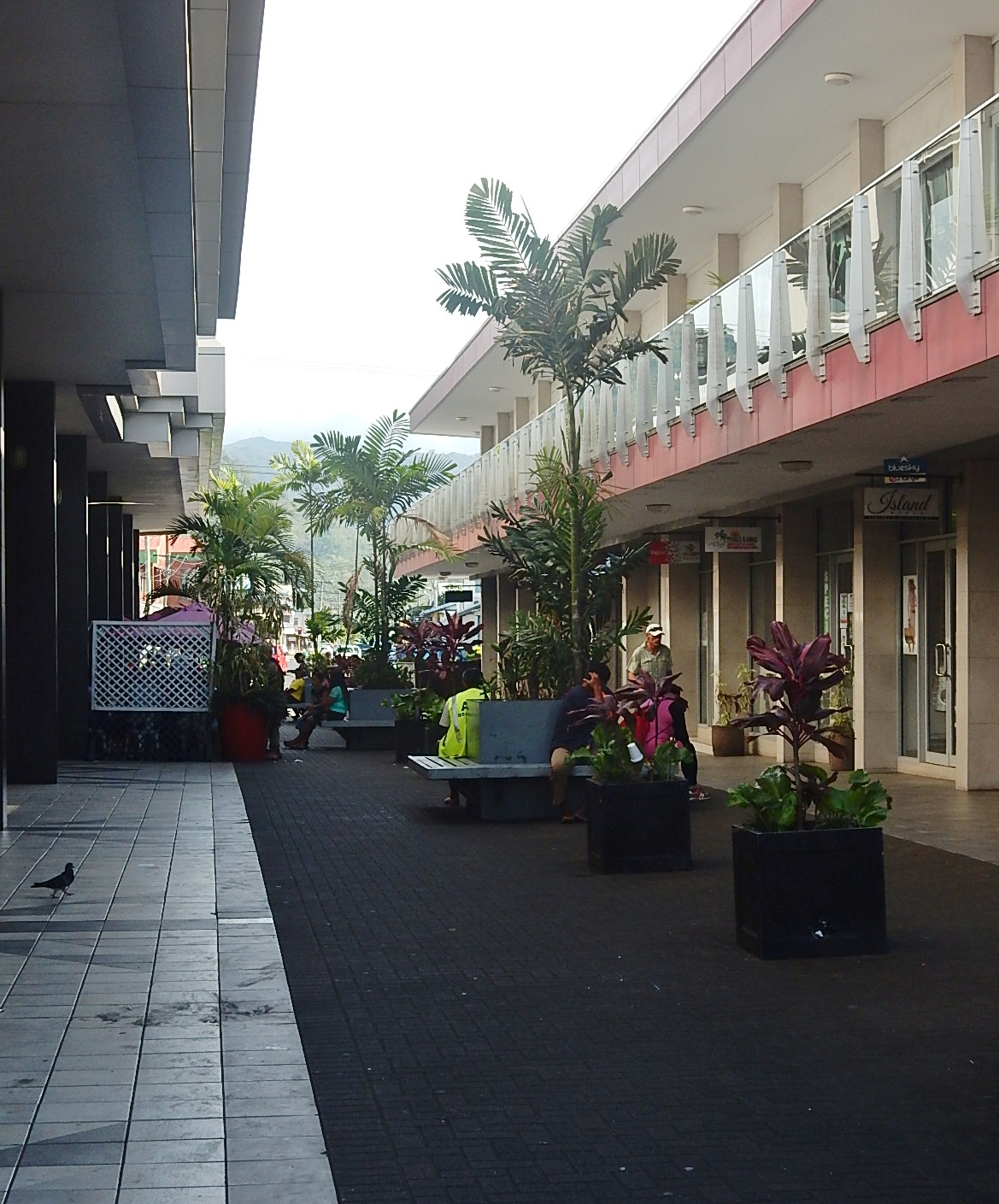
A mall in Apia

Mulinuʻu, the old ceremonial capital, lies at the city's western end, and is the location of the Parliament House (Maota Fono), and the historic observatory built during the German era is now the meteorology office.

The historic Catholic cathedral in Apia, the Immaculate Conception of Mary Cathedral, was dedicated 31 December 1867. It was pulled down mid-2011, reportedly due to structural damage from the earthquake of September 2009. A new cathedral was built and dedicated 31 May 2014.

An area of reclaimed land jutting into the harbour is the site of the Fiame Mataafa Faumuina Mulinuu II (FMFM II) building, the multi-storey government offices named after the first Prime Minister of Samoa, and the Central Bank of Samoa. A clock tower erected as a war memorial acts as a central point for the city. The new market (maketi fou) is inland at Fugalei, where it is more protected from the effects of cyclones. Apia still has some of the early, wooden, colonial buildings which remain scattered around the town, most notably the old courthouse from the German colonial era, with a museum on the upper floor (the new courthouse is in Mulinuʻu). Recent infrastructural development and economic growth has seen several multi-storey buildings rise in the city. The ACC building (2001) houses the Accident Compensation Board, the National Bank of Samoa, and some government departments. The mall below it is home to shops and eateries. The Samoatel building (2004) which is the site for Samoa's international telecommunications hub, was built inland at Maluafou, also to protect it from the effects of seasonal cyclones. The DBS building (2007) in Savalalo houses the Development Bank of Samoa and new courts complex in Mulinuu, with the district, supreme, and land & titles courts (2010). The Tui Atua Tupua Tamasese Building (2012) in Sogi houses government ministries. Another addition to Apia's skyline is the SNPF Molesi shopping mall, opened in 2013. A new hospital complex was completed at Mot'ootua.

Scottish-born writer Robert Louis Stevenson spent the last four years of his life here, and is buried on Mount Vaea, overlooking the city. The home he built at Vailima is now the Robert Louis Stevenson Museum, and the Vailima Botanical Gardens have been developed on the former estate. Stevenson had taken the Samoan name Tusitala ("writer of tales").

Falemata'aga - Museum of Samoa is located in a former German colonial school in the city.

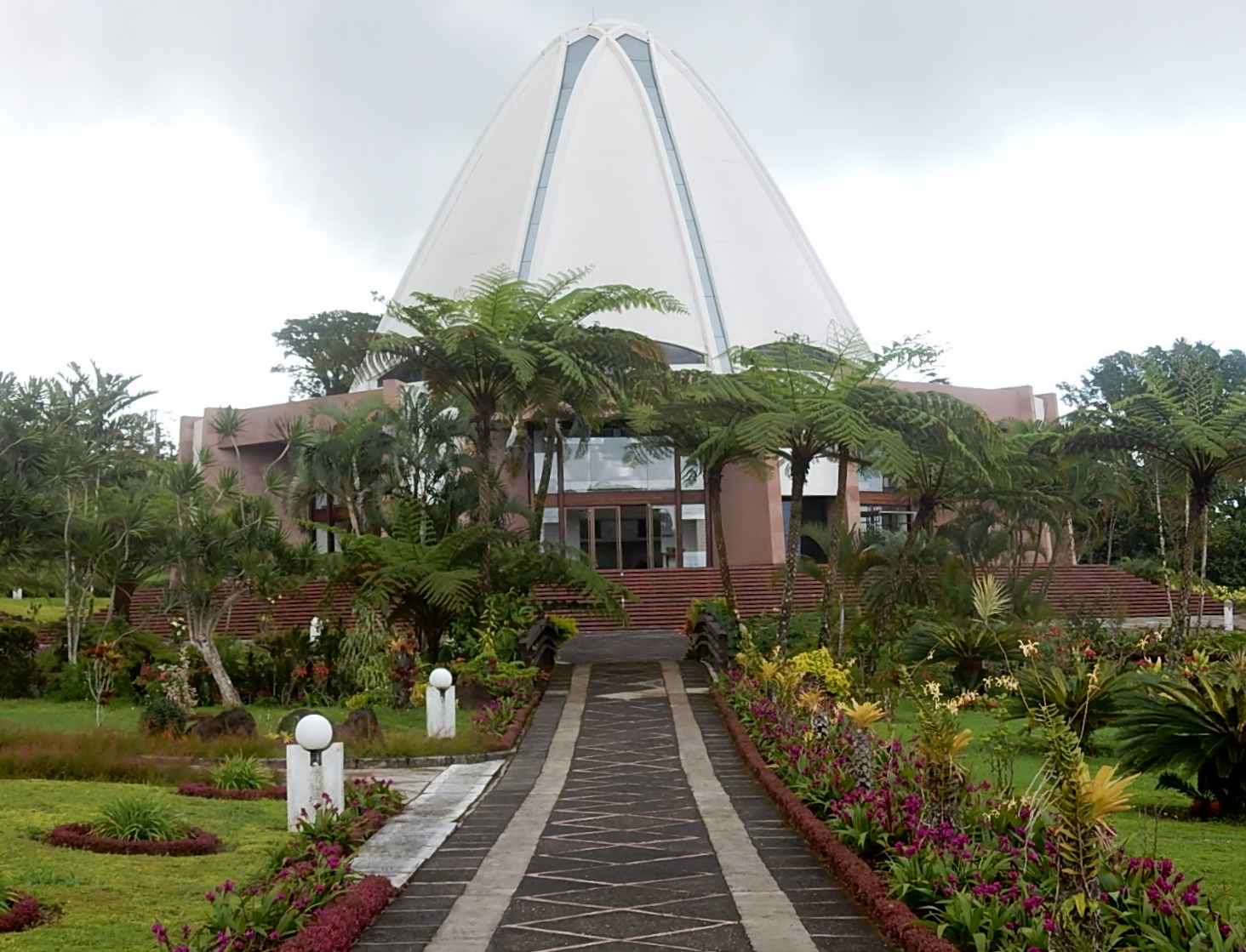
The Bahá’í House of Worship in Apia

The Bahá’í House of Worship for the Pacific is located in Apia, one of only eight continental Bahá’í Houses of Worship. Designed by architect Hossein Amanat and opened in 1984, it serves the island as a gathering space for people of all backgrounds and religions to meditate, reflect, and pray together.

== Economy ==
Talofa Airways and Samoa Airways have their headquarters in Apia. Grey Investment Group has its headquarters in downtown Apia. This company also owned the first private National Bank of Samoa in Samoa, with Grey Investment Group, Samoa Artisan Water Company Ltd and Apia Bottling Company Ltd as shareholders. Grey Investment owns a multitude of commercial and residential property investments throughout Samoa and New Zealand.

30% of the businesses in downtown Apia are owned by one Chinese family. Ten per cent of the downtown businesses are owned by Europeans, while the other 60% are owned by the local community.

== Transport ==
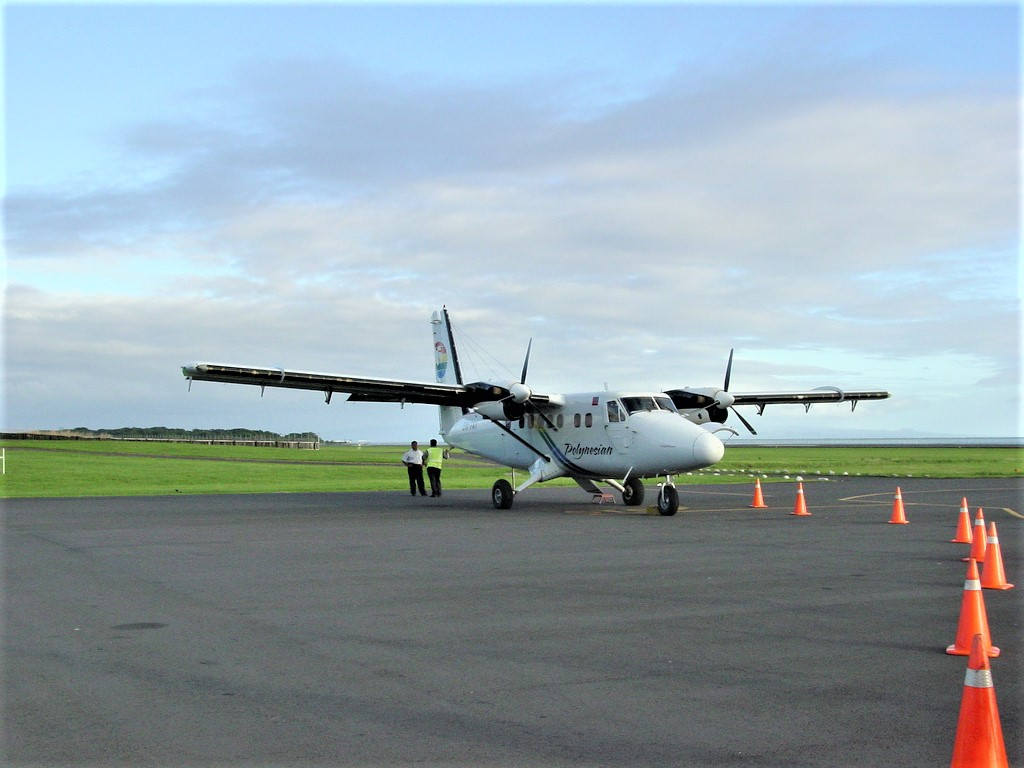
Airplane at the airport

Apia Harbour is by far the largest and busiest harbour in Samoa. International shipping with containers, LPG gas, and fuels all dock here. Ferries to Tokelau and American Samoa depart from here.

Apia is served by a good road network, which is generally kept reasonably well maintained. Most of the main roads are sealed; the unsealed roads have lower use. Vehicles drive on the left-hand side of the road since 7 September 2009.

The Samoan government started the second phase of a major upgrading of arterial routes around the Apia Urban Area in 2012, with incremental widening of major roads around the city.

The country has no trains or trams, but is served by an extensive, privatised bus and taxi system. People commonly walk around the town, or even some distances outside it. There are few bicycles and motorcycles, but traffic congestion due to a huge increase in vehicle ownership has necessitated a major upgrade in road infrastructure.

The main international airport, Faleolo International Airport, is a 40-minute drive west of the city. Samoa's major domestic airlines, Polynesian Airlines and Talofa Airways, service this airport. Fagali'i Airport, the small airstrip in Fagali'i, was used for internal flights and some international flights to Pago Pago in American Samoa.

== Education ==
Apia is home to a number of pre-schools, primary, secondary and post-secondary institutions, including Samoa's only university, the National University of Samoa. In addition, the University of the South Pacific School of Agriculture maintains a campus at Alafua, on the outskirts of Apia. Another major school in Apia is Robert Louis Stevenson School which is a private primary and secondary school. Robert Louis Stevenson school is known as Samoa's upper class school, due to many children of Samoa's wealthy classes attending it.

=== Universities ===
- National University of Samoa
- University of the South Pacific
- Oceania University of Medicine

=== Colleges in Upolu Island ===
- LDS Church College of Pesega, Pesega
- Faatuatua Christian College, Vaitele Fou
- Kolisi o Sagata Maria, also called St Mary's College, Vaimoso
- Leififi College, Leififi
- Leulumoega-fou College, Malua
- Maluafou College, Maluafou
- Saint Joseph's College, Alafua
- Samoa College, Vaivase Tai
- Seventh Day Adventist College, Lalovaea
- Robert Louis Stevenson College, Tafaigata
- Wesley College, Faleula
- Nuuausala College, Nofoalii
- Paul V1 College, Leulumoega Tuai
- Chanel College, Moamoa
- Avele College, Vailima
- Lepa Lotofaga College
- Palalaua College, Siumu
- Aleipata College
- Anoamaa College
- Falealili College
- Safata College
- Aana No. 1 College
- Aana No. 2 College
- Sagaga College

=== Colleges in Savaii Island ===
- Tuasivi College
- LDS Church College of Vaiola
- Wesleyan College (Uesiliana)
- Don Bosco College
- Itu O Tane College
- Palauli College
- Palauli I Sisifo College
- Amoa College
- Vaimauga College
- Papauta Girls College
- Mataevave College

=== Primary schools ===
Most of the villages have their own primary schools, but the Churches run most of the primary schools in downtown Apia.

- Robert Louis Stevenson School, Lotopa
- Marist Brothers' School, Mulivai
- Saint Mary's School, Savalalo
- Peace Chapel School, Vaimea
- Apia Baptist School, Aai o Niue
- Seventh-day Adventist Primary School, Lalovaea
- All Saints Anglican School, Malifa

== Sport ==
=== Pacific Games ===
Apia hosted the Pacific Games in 1983 for the first time in the country's history. The Games returned to Apia for the 2007 Pacific Games, in which Samoa finished third. A crowd of 20,000 attended the 2007 Games closing ceremony at Apia Park.

=== Association football ===
Apia hosted the Oceania region's qualification matches for the 2010 FIFA World Cup. As such, Apia was the location of the first goal scored in the 2010 qualifiers, by Pierre Wajoka of New Caledonia against Tahiti. The qualification matches commenced on 27 August 2007 and finished on 7 September 2007. All matches were played at the Toleafoa J.S. Blatter Complex, which is named after FIFA president Sepp Blatter.

The complex, based in Apia, is also the venue of the Samoa national football team's home matches and has a capacity of 3,500.

=== Judo ===
The capital also hosted from 2009 to 2012 the IJF Judo World Cup, which was downgraded in 2013 to become a regional tournament called the 'Oceania Open'.

=== Cricket ===
Apia hosted the 2012 ICC World Cricket League Division Eight tournament at the Faleata Oval's, which consists of four cricket grounds. The national teams of Samoa, Belgium, Japan, Suriname, Ghana, Bhutan, Norway and Vanuatu took part. It was the first time a tournament officially sanctioned by the International Cricket Council had been held in the region.

=== Basketball ===
Apia hosted the 2018 FIBA Polynesia Basketball Cup where Samoa's national basketball team finished runner-up.

== Sister cities ==
- Shenzhen, Guangdong, China (2015)
- Compton, California, United States (2010)
- Oranjestad, Aruba (2012)
- Riohacha, Colombia (2019)
- (Taiwan) Taipei, Republic of China

== Notable influence ==
- Pene Pati, operatic tenor

== See also ==
- 1889 Apia cyclone
