= Bloody Mary (South Pacific) =

Character in Tales of the South Pacific

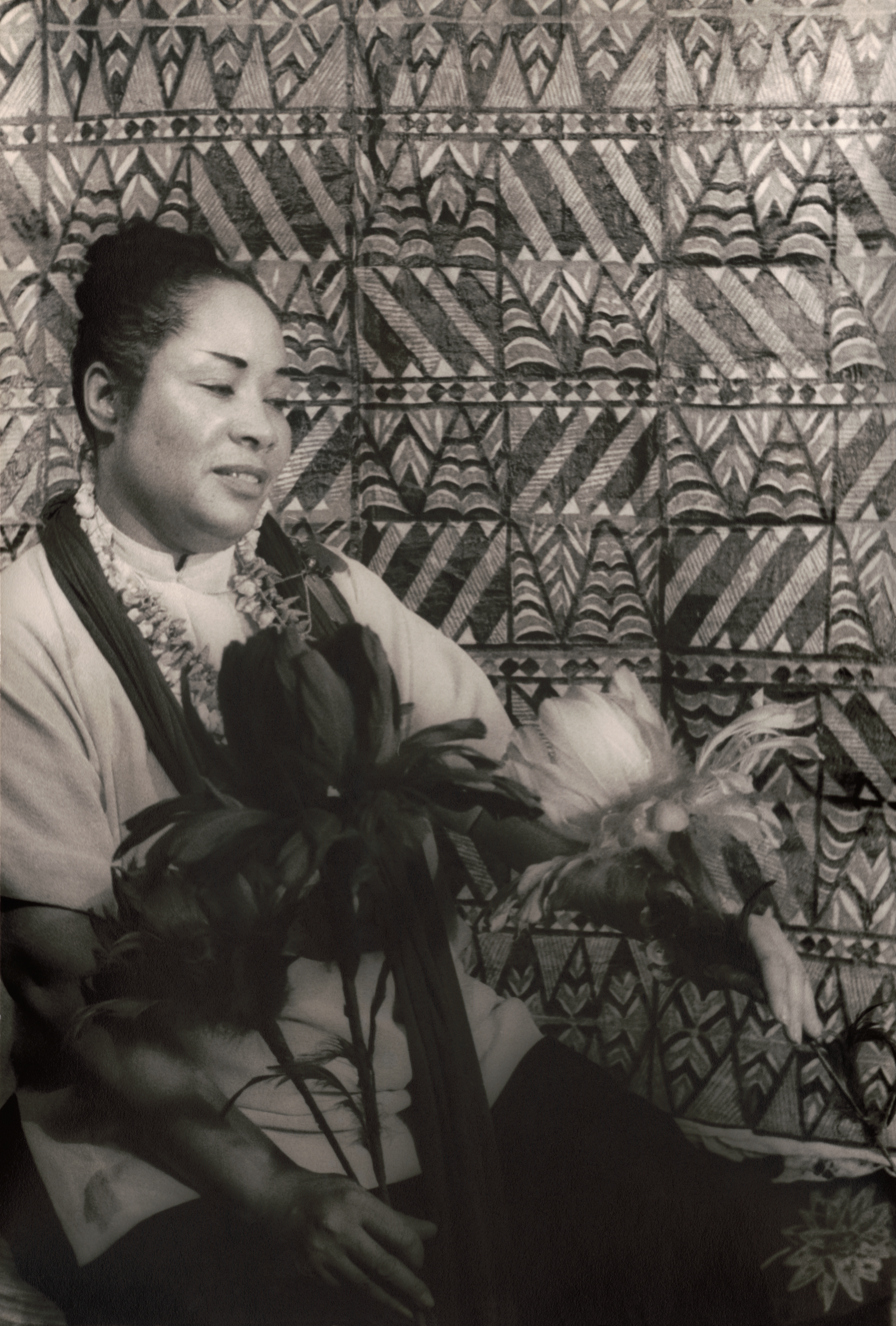
Bloody Mary as portrayed by Juanita Hall, who originated the role in South Pacific (1949)

Bloody Mary is a character in the 1946 book Tales of the South Pacific by James Michener, which was made into the 1949 musical South Pacific by Rodgers and Hammerstein, and later into a film in 1958.

The Bloody Mary character is Vietnamese (Tonkinese). Tonkin is the northernmost region of what is now Vietnam. She was brought to the island by a French planter. She is often cast as black (most famously by Juanita Hall, who originated the character on the stage, and later portrayed her in the 1958 film), Asian or Pacific Islander. She trades with the US sailors who are stationed on nearby islands during the Second World War. She is learning English, and is proud that she will eventually "speak English as good as any crummy Marine". When the American spurns her daughter's hand out of prejudice, her most famous line is "Stingy stinker!" Juanita Hall won the Tony Award for Best Featured Actress in a Musical for originating this role on stage.

A song from the Rodgers and Hammerstein musical about her makes U.S. Navy sailors sing, "Bloody Mary is the girl I love", "her skin is tender as a baseball glove", and that she chews "betel nuts", and doesn't use "Pepsodent", with the refrain "Now ain't that too damn bad!"

Possible models for her are Aggie Grey or her sister Mary Croudace (Auntie Mary); hotelkeepers in Apia, Samoa who hosted American film stars and military personnel. They were daughters of an Englishman and his Samoan wife. Kirsten Thompson posits "that Bloody Mary was a composite of an unnamed Tonkinese worker, Madame Gardel, and aspects of Aggie’s character and personality." Françoise Gardel was visited by Michener when 60 Minutes took him back to Vanuatu to revisit the settings of his novel.

A 2001 article in Islands Magazine states that Michener renamed Aoba Island Bali-ha'i. The author interviewed the proprietor of a resort on Espiritu Santo, who claimed the "real Bloody Mary" lived on Espiritu Santo for many years after the war and lived to the age of 102.
