= South Pacific (1958 film) =

1958 film by Joshua Logan

- Theatrical release poster
- Directed by: Joshua Logan
- Screenplay by: Paul Osborn
- Based on: South Pacific (1949 musical) by Oscar Hammerstein II Joshua Logan; Tales of the South Pacific (1947 collection) by James A. Michener
- Produced by: Buddy Adler
- Starring: Rossano Brazzi; Mitzi Gaynor; John Kerr; France Nuyen; Ray Walston; Juanita Hall
- Cinematography: Leon Shamroy
- Edited by: Robert L. Simpson
- Music by: Richard Rodgers (songs); Oscar Hammerstein II (lyrics); Alfred Newman (adaptation)
- Production company: 20th Century-Fox; Magna Theatre Corporation; South Pacific Enterprises
- Distributed by: Magna Theatre Corporation (roadshow); 20th Century-Fox (general)
- Release date: March 19, 1958
- Running time: 172 minutes (roadshow); 157 minutes (general)
- Country: United States
- Language: English
- Budget: $5.61 million
- Box office: $17.5 or $36.8 million

South Pacific is a 1958 American romantic musical film directed by Joshua Logan, based on the 1949 Rodgers and Hammerstein stage musical, which in turn was based on James A. Michener's 1947 short-story collection Tales of the South Pacific. It stars Rossano Brazzi, Mitzi Gaynor, John Kerr, Ray Walston, and France Nuyen in the leading roles, with Juanita Hall as Bloody Mary, the part that she had played in the original stage production. It is set in 1943, during World War II, on an island in the South Pacific.

The film was released in a roadshow presentation by Magna Theatre Corporation on March 19, 1958, and in general release by 20th Century-Fox. South Pacific was a great commercial success, becoming the highest-grossing Rodgers and Hammerstein musical film until the release of The Sound of Music. At the 31st Academy Awards, the film won for Best Sound out of three total nominations. It was also nominated for three Golden Globes, including Best Motion Picture – Musical or Comedy and Best Actress in a Motion Picture – Musical or Comedy (for Mitzi Gaynor).

== Plot ==
During World War II, the U.S. Navy and U.S. Marines are preparing a counteroffensive against the Imperial Japanese Navy in the islands of the South Pacific. Lieutenant Joe Cable, a Marine officer, asks a local French planter, Emile de Becque, to assist with a reconnaissance mission behind Japanese lines, but de Becque declines; he has fallen in love with U.S. Navy nurse Nellie Forbush and does not want to get involved.

Luther Billis, a Navy Construction Battalion sailor (Seabee), persuades Cable to visit the nearby island of Bali Hai, where Cable falls in love with a local girl, Liat. Nellie is appalled at the revelation that de Becque had children with a Polynesian woman (who has since died), revealing her prejudice, while Cable says he will not marry Liat; he is distressed by the thought of bringing her back to his family, fearing their reaction. Liat's mother, Bloody Mary, says in that case she will marry Liat to Jacques Barrere, a French planter old enough to be her father.

Distraught by his separation from Nellie and with nothing to lose, de Becque volunteers to go with Cable, who wishes to complete the mission and live the rest of his life on Bali Hai with Liat. The two men fly to a local fishing boat in order to secretly access a Japanese-held island, to provide vital intelligence for the U.S. Navy. The group comes under heavy fire from a Japanese plane and Cable is killed, but the mission is a success and the Navy gains knowledge that allows it to move on the Japanese forces.

De Becque survives the gunfire and is rescued. He returns home to find his children being cared for by Nellie, who has changed her mind about them and about Emile's late wife. She and Emile reconcile and reunite.

== Cast ==
Credits from the AFI Catalog of Feature Films:

- Rossano Brazzi as Emile de Becque
- Mitzi Gaynor as Ensign Nellie Forbush, USN
- John Kerr as Lieutenant Joseph Cable, USMC
- Ray Walston as Luther Billis
- Juanita Hall as Bloody Mary
- France Nuyen as Liat
- Russ Brown as Captain George Brackett
- Jack Mullaney as The Professor
- Ken Clark as Stewpot
- Floyd Simmons as Commander Bill Harbison
- Candace Lee as Ngana
- Warren Hsieh as Jerome
- Tom Laughlin as Lieutenant Buzz Adams
- Francis Kahele as Henry, Emile's servant
- Robert Jacobs and John Gabriel as Communications men
- Richard Harrison as Co-pilot
- Ron Ely as Navigator
- Richard H. Cutting as Admiral Kester
- Archie Savage as Ceremonial dance chief
- Doug McClure as Pilot in hospital
- James A. Michener as Missionary (uncredited)

Singing voices

- Giorgio Tozzi as Emile de Becque
- Bill Lee as Lieutenant Joseph Cable, USMC
- Muriel Smith as Bloody Mary
- Thurl Ravenscroft as Stewpot
- Marie Greene as Ngana
- Betty Wand as Jerome

== Comparisons to source material ==
All the songs from the stage production were retained for the film. "My Girl Back Home", sung by Cable and Nellie, cut from the Broadway show, was added.

One difference between the film and Broadway versions is that the first and second scenes of the play are switched, together with the songs in those two scenes. The original European cut of the film shown in the United Kingdom and Europe does not switch those scenes and plays out as on the stage. The stage version begins with Nellie and Emile's first scene together on the plantation, then proceeds to show Bloody Mary, Cable, and the Seabees on the beach, while in the film version Cable is shown at the very beginning being flown to the island, where the Seabees and Bloody Mary have their first musical numbers. (The first musical number in the film is "Bloody Mary", sung by the Seabees, while in the stage version it is "Dites-moi", sung by Emile's children. The only version of this song in the final release print of the film is a reprise sung with Emile. Only on the soundtrack recording is it first heard as a duet by the children Ngana and Jerome.) Emile is not shown in the film until about 30 minutes into it; in the film, Nellie first appears during the scene with the Seabees. Because of the switch, the show's most famous song, "Some Enchanted Evening", is not heard until nearly 45 minutes into the film, while in the show it is heard about 15 minutes after Act I starts.

== Production ==
=== Development ===
Following the successes of the film versions of Rodgers & Hammerstein's Oklahoma! (1955) and Carousel (1956), the producers decided on a similar adaptation of South Pacific as their next project. The film was produced by "South Pacific Enterprises", a company created specifically for the production, owned by Rodgers, Hammerstein, Logan, Magna Theatre Corporation (owners of the Todd-AO widescreen process the film would be photographed in), and Leland Hayward, producer of the original stage production. 20th Century-Fox partially invested in the production in exchange for some distribution rights. Additionally, all production departments and department heads were Fox's, and the studio's research department re-engineered the Todd-AO process, changing its frame rate from 30 fps (for 70mm presentations) to 24 fps, thereby eliminating "simufilming" in 65mm and 35mm (as in Oklahoma!) or in 65mm 30 fps and 65mm 24 fps (as in Around the World in 80 Days), and for the most part eliminating the American Optical lenses, replacing these with Bausch & Lomb's then new Super Baltars, and for the most part replacing the Fearless Superfilm cameras with a new family of Mitchell cameras commissioned by Fox (BFC, "Blimped Fox Camera", a 65mm version of Mitchell's BNC, and FC, "Fox Camera", a 65mm version of Mitchell's NC). The original Todd-AO cameras continued to be employed, occasionally, as a B or C camera.

=== Casting ===
The producers' original plan was to have Ezio Pinza and Mary Martin, the two leads of the original Broadway cast, reprise their roles for the film, but Pinza died suddenly in May 1957. Had he lived to perform in the film, the producers would have cast Martin. Logan said he was unable to find an actor who would match Martin; the only big star of the right age seemed to be Vittorio de Sica, whom Logan felt "too saturnine".

Doris Day was offered the part of Nellie, but passed on it; Elizabeth Taylor tested for the same role, but was rejected by Rodgers after she suffered stage fright in her audition. Logan later heard her sing but was unable to persuade Rodgers to change his mind. Ultimately, Mitzi Gaynor, who had prior work in musical films, and had tested twice for Nellie, was cast in the role. Rossano Brazzi was cast as Emile, a role that was first offered to such established stars as Charles Boyer, Howard Keel, and Fernando Lamas. Ray Walston, a noted Broadway musical actor, played the part of Seabee Luther Billis, which he had previously played on stage in London.

Juanita Hall sang in the stage production and took part in the recording of the stage production cast album, but her singing was dubbed for the film by Muriel Smith, who played Bloody Mary in the London stage production. Metropolitan Opera star Giorgio Tozzi provided the singing voice for Emile in the film. John Kerr starred as Cable; his singing voice was dubbed by Bill Lee. Ken Clark, who played Stewpot, was dubbed by Thurl Ravenscroft (who also sang "You're a Mean One, Mr. Grinch" and was the voice of Tony the Tiger). Gaynor and Walston were the only principal cast members whose own singing voices were used.

=== Filming ===
Hanalei Bay, on the Hawaiian island of Kauai, served as the filming location, with Emil Kosa Jr.'s matte paintings providing distant views of the fantastic island Bali Ha'i. A second unit filmed aerial views of Fijian islands while some sources claim footage of Tioman Island, off Malaysia's southeast coast, were also featured, though this seems unlikely given the logistics involved. Location filming provided sweeping shots of tropical island scenes, as well as a new sequence not in the stage version, in which Billis, having parachuted from a damaged plane, has a boat dropped on him, then comes under a series of attacks, following his fatalistic "Oh, it's going to be one of those days, huh?"

The film includes the use of colored filters during many of the song sequences, which has been a source of criticism for the film. Director Joshua Logan wanted these filters to produce subtle changes, but was displeased with the extremeness of the changes. There was no time to repair the color before the release date, since tickets to the film were pre-sold (it was a roadshow attraction). Logan wrote in his memoirs that he wished he could stand outside theaters playing the movie, wearing a sign that said, "I DIRECTED IT, AND I DON'T LIKE THE COLOR EITHER!"

== Musical numbers ==
The film opens with an orchestral overture lasting 3 minutes and 30 seconds.

1. "Bloody Mary"
2. "There Is Nothing Like a Dame"
3. "Bali Ha'i"
4. "A Cock-Eyed Optimist"
5. "Twin Soliloquies"
6. "Some Enchanted Evening"
7. "Dites-moi"
8. "I'm Gonna Wash That Man Right Outta My Hair" (This number was abridged in the film; the soundtrack recording includes the full version.)
9. "I'm in Love with a Wonderful Guy"
10. "Younger Than Springtime"
11. "Happy Talk"
12. "Honey Bun"
13. "My Girl Back Home"
14. "You've Got to Be Carefully Taught"
15. "This Nearly Was Mine"
16. "Finale"

== Release ==
Magna Theatre Corporation, which originally owned a stake in the film, handled the distribution of the roadshow theatrical release in Todd-AO, while Fox distributed the film for its general release in CinemaScope. It opened at the Criterion Theatre in New York City on March 19, 1958, before opening in Miami Beach on March 24, in Philadelphia and Chicago on March 26, and expanding to eight more cities within a month. Originally shown in a nearly three-hour roadshow version, it was cut to two and a half hours for general release.

The film was re-released in 1964 and by The Samuel Goldwyn Company in 1983.

=== Restoration ===
The three-hour version, long feared lost, was rediscovered in a 70mm print owned by a collector. It screened in Bradford, England, at the National Museum of Photography, Film, and Television on March 14, 2005. When Fox (which by that time owned partial distribution rights to the film, including home video) learned of the print's existence, it took it to the United States to reinstate the 14 missing minutes and attempt to restore as much of the color as possible.

=== Home media ===
A two-disc DVD set of both the longer and shorter versions was released in the United States on Region 1 on November 7, 2006, and earlier in the United Kingdom on region 2 on March 20, 2006.

On March 31, 2009, South Pacific became the first Rodgers and Hammerstein musical available on high definition Blu-ray.

In October 2023, Samuel Goldwyn Films, a successor to the Samuel Goldwyn Company, signed a worldwide catalog deal with Concord Originals for rights to three Rodgers and Hammerstein films, including South Pacific. The company plans to release the films on video on demand and other home entertainment platforms sometime in the final quarter of 2023, as well as in new DVD and Blu-ray anniversary editions.

== Reception ==
=== Box office ===
South Pacific earned $7 million in theatrical rentals in the U.S. and Canada from its roadshow release. It reached number one at the US box office in its eighth week of release and spent three weeks at number one. It was off number one for one week before returning for another three weeks. It spent another two weeks at number one in August 1958, for a total of eight weeks. It was withdrawn from general release at the end of 1960 with rentals of $16.3 million, earning a place among the 50 most popular movies of all time at the domestic box office when adjusted for inflation and the size of the population in its era. In its 1964 reissue, the film earned another $1.2 million in rentals, taking its total to $17.5 million. The film was a big hit in the United Kingdom and played continuously at the Dominion Theatre in London for nearly four and a half years, grossing $3.9 million at the theatre. After four years of release in the UK (and before its general release), it had grossed $9.4 million, surpassing Gone With the Wind (1939) as the highest-grossing film in the United Kingdom. It performed badly in other European countries such as France, Germany, and Italy.

South Pacific was the highest-grossing Rodgers and Hammerstein musical film until The Sound of Music was released seven years later.

=== Critical response ===
On the review aggregator Rotten Tomatoes, the film holds an approval rating of 75% based on reviews from 12 critics.

=== Accolades ===
Ceremony	Category	Nominee	Result	Ref.
31st Academy Awards	Best Cinematography (Color)	Leon Shamroy	Nominated	
31st Academy Awards	Best Music (Scoring of a Musical Picture)	Alfred Newman, Ken Darby	Nominated	
31st Academy Awards	Best Sound	Fred Hynes	Won	
16th Golden Globe Awards	Best Motion Picture – Musical or Comedy	—N/a	Nominated	
16th Golden Globe Awards	Best Actress in a Motion Picture – Musical or Comedy	Mitzi Gaynor	Nominated	
16th Golden Globe Awards	New Star of the Year – Actress	France Nuyen	Nominated	

==== Best-of lists ====
The film is recognized by the American Film Institute on these lists:

- 2002: AFI's 100 Years...100 Passions – Nominated
- 2004: AFI's 100 Years...100 Songs:
  - "Some Enchanted Evening" – #28
  - "Bali Ha'i" – Nominated
- 2006: AFI's Greatest Movie Musicals – Nominated

In 2003, South Pacific was voted 39th on Channel 4's list of the "100 Greatest Musicals" (just behind The Nightmare Before Christmas).

== Soundtrack ==
The soundtrack album of the film was released by RCA Victor in 1958. It was a major success, reaching number one in both the US and UK. In the US, the album stayed at number one on the Billboard 200 for seven months, the fourth-longest run ever. The album remained in the top five of the UK Albums Chart for 27 consecutive weeks before reaching number one in November 1958. It would remain at the top of the chart for a record-breaking 115 weeks and remaining in the top five for 214 weeks.

In 2004, "Some Enchanted Evening" was ranked number 28 on the American Film Institute's list 100 Years...100 Songs.

== Other adaptations ==
In 2001, a television version of the musical starring Glenn Close, Harry Connick Jr., and Rade Šerbedžija was released.

A film remake by producers Ileen Maisel and Bob Balaban starring Michelle Williams as Nellie Forbush was announced in 2010, but has not materialized.

== See also ==
- List of American films of 1958
