= Pulemelei Mound =

Ancient Samoan structure

Coordinates: 13°44′6″S 172°19′28″W

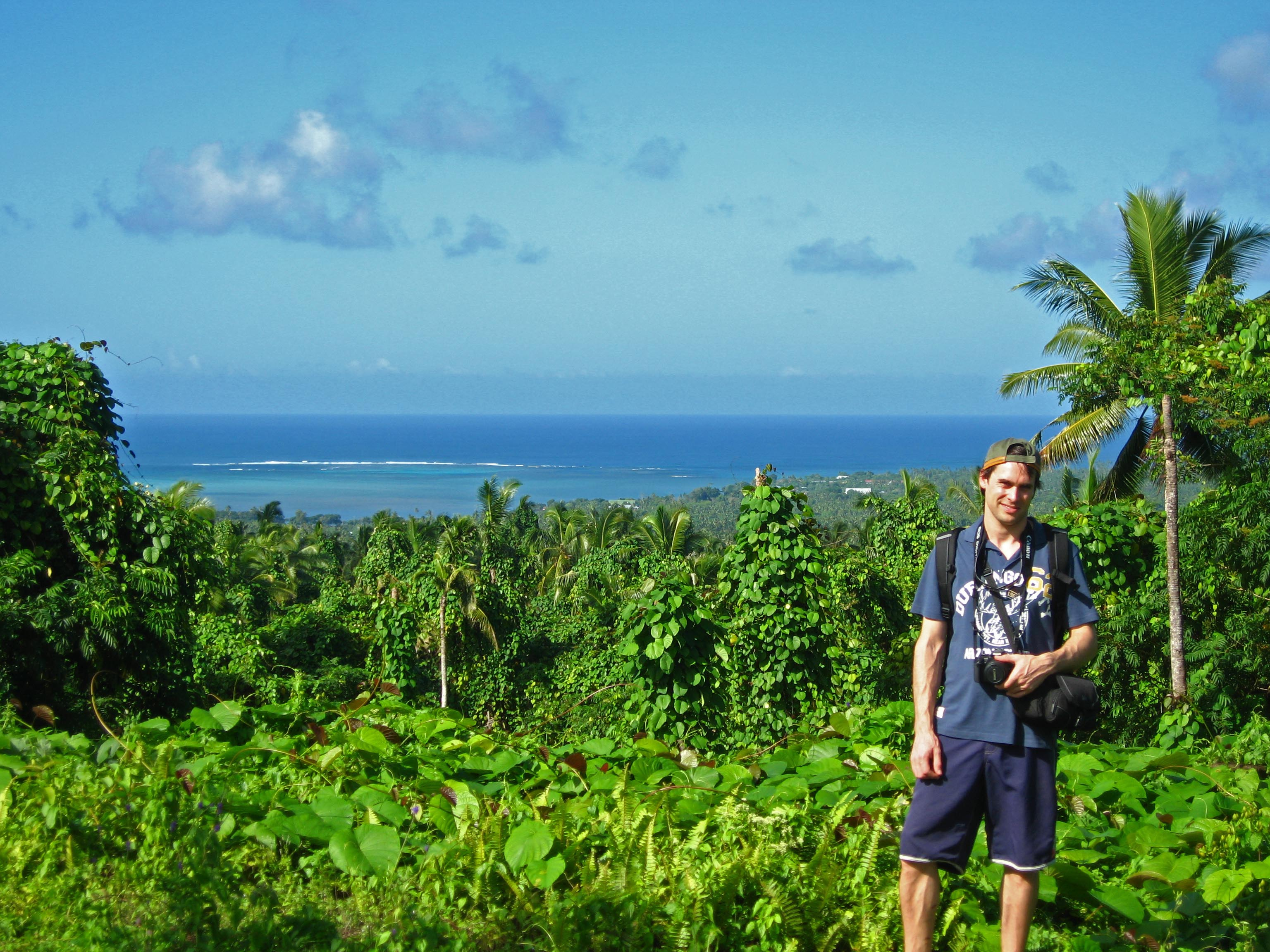
View from Pulemelei Mound

The Pulemelei mound (also known as Tia Seu Ancient Mound) and is the largest and most ancient humanmade structure in the Samoan Islands. It is situated in Letolo Plantation in the Palauli district, at the east end of Savai'i island in Samoa.

The stone mound is a pyramid constructed of basalt stones and at its base measures 65 by 60 metres (213 ft × 197 ft) and has a height of about 12 metres (39 ft) on the south edge and 7 metres (23 ft) on the north edge, and appears to have been oriented to the cardinal directions. Excavations have revealed that it was probably constructed sometime between 1100–1400 AD and was no longer used by 1700–1800 AD. The mound was constructed with a base platform made of volcanic stones, and appears to be built on vertically placed foundations stones. On top of the base stone there are three platforms on top of each other, with vertical or slightly sloping side walls. The top platform surface was level and paved with rounded stream stones, and more than 40 stone cairns were found of recent origin distributed on the top. Local informants provided that the stone piles were built when the mound was cleared of vegetation.

== Archaeological survey and investigations ==
=== 1977–1978 Survey ===
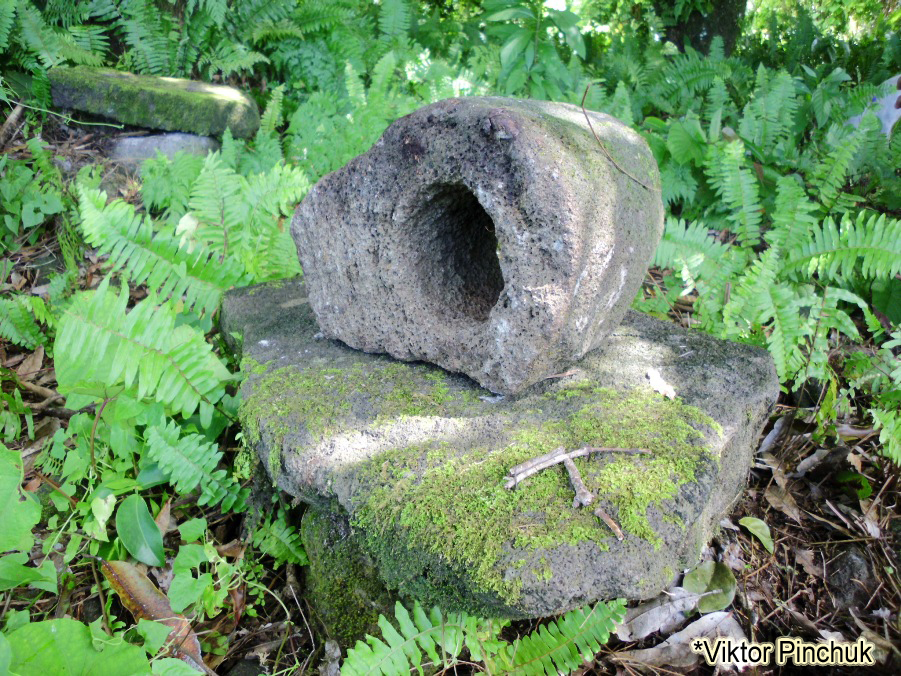
Photo from book Pinchuk V. "Two months of wanderings and 14 days of unfreedom", p. 102, ISBN 978-5-9909912-5-5

Archaeological surveys by Gregory Jackmond in 1977–1978 recorded 3000 features including stone platforms, stone fences, pathways and earth ovens.

=== 2002–2004 Archaeological excavations ===
Archeological work at the Pulemelei Mound was conducted during 3 field season 2002–2004 by Dr. Helene Martinsson-Wallin (leader of excavation) and Dr. Paul Wallin of Kon-Tiki Museum and Dr. Geoffrey Clark of the Australian National University and plus twenty men from the nearby Vailoa under supervision of the landowners Nelson inc. The purpose of the excavation was to understand the chronology of the mound and surrounding settlement and its relationship to the origin and development of the Polynesian chiefdoms and stratification in Samoa.

After removal of the secondary canopy a digital map was created to allow detailed description of the mound and expose whatever degree of structural degeneration it may have. Extensive excavation and radiocarbon dating revealed that there was a settlement under the mound featuring potsherds, ovens and stone tools dating around 2000 years ago and another settlement phase around 900 years ago just prior to the first mound phase was constructed. ". The first mound phase was a 65x50 meter large and 3 meter high platform of outlined by stones on edge and this was subsequently added in height with a most recent modification in the 16th century when sunken walkways was added on the East and West side of the mound. The excavators have interpreted the mound as an important central place and ceremonial site tied to the stratification of the Samoan society. After examining the radiocarbon data found from charcoal in several sites in Samoa including the Pulemelei Mound, have found that the earth ovens, were used for cooking the root of the ti plant (Cordyline fruticosa) and cooked at high temperature becomes edible. Researchers believe the plant could have been used in ritual ceremonies.

During the second half of the Samoan "Dark Age" (700–1000 AD) there is stronger evidence for human activity in the Pulemelei area. Through more radiocarbon dating the researchers also determined that "the addition of the top platform is likely to be contemporary with the construction of the Umu ti and the pavement/house on the south side of the Pulemelei mound.

== See also ==
- Archaeology in Samoa
- Early history of Tonga
- Falemata'aga - Museum of Samoa
