= Robert Louis Stevenson School, Samoa =

Samoan private school

Coordinates: 13°50′40″S 171°49′50″W

Robert Louis Stevenson School is a private school situated in Apia, Samoa. It was first established in 1987 and was the first private school to operate in the country. As of 2023, the school has 21 teachers teaching some 1,400 students.

The school has both a primary school campus and a secondary school campus. The primary school was located originally in Siusega, but moved to Lotopa. Similarly, the secondary school campus was moved from Mulinuʻu to Tafaigata.
