= Inter Island Airways =

Airline based in American Samoa

IATA	ICAO	Call sign
—	—	Inter Island
- Founded: August 1993
- Focus cities: Apia / Faleolo International Airport; Manu'a Islands / Fitiuta Airport; Pago Pago / Pago Pago International Airport
- Fleet size: 2
- Destinations: 3
- Headquarters: Pago Pago, American Samoa
- Key people: Alex Sene Jr. (President); Barney Sene (Executive VP)
- Website: www.interislandair.com

Inter Island Airways Dornier 228 at Tau Airport, Manu'a Islands of American Samoa in November 2003

Inter Island Airways (also known as "Inter Island Air") was an American Samoan airline based in Pago Pago. It operated passenger and cargo flights in and between American Samoa, Samoa and neighboring Pacific island countries. Its main base of operations was at Pago Pago International Airport.

The airline's authorisation to operate was suspended by the US Department of Transportation in 2017.

== History ==
Inter Island Airways, a privately owned company, was established in August 1993 as an FAA Part 135 On-Demand Air Taxi Carrier. Inter Island Airways received its air carrier certificate in September 1995 and began providing domestic passenger and cargo air service between Pago Pago (Tutuila Island), and Tau (in the Manu'a Islands). The airline initiated on-demand passenger service with two 9-seater Aero Commander aircraft.

The airline suspended air operations in late 1997 to focus its attention on expanding its facilities, and acquiring a modern aircraft fleet starting with a new STOL type 19-seater Dornier 228-212 aircraft in April 1998.

In November 2003, Inter Island Airways restarted flight operations when Samoa Air suspended airline operations in September of the same year due to financial difficulties. The airline provided domestic cargo and on-demand charter passenger service between Pago Pago and Tau. In December 2004, following an FAA inspection, it was granted an Air Carrier Certificate to operate in American Samoa.

In January 2005, Inter Island Airways re-obtained its own Part 135 air carrier certificate and began expanding internationally, beginning on-demand passenger air charter service between Pago Pago and Apia, Samoa in June 2005. In July 2007, Inter Island Airways received Commuter Air Carrier Authorization. In January 2009, its license to fly to Samoa expired.

Inter Island Airways expanded its fleet in February 2005 with the acquisition of a 9-seater Britten-Norman Islander BN2B-26. In December 2005, an additional 19-seater Dornier 228-212 aircraft was acquired. In November 2009 it took delivery of a 30-seater Dornier 328.

In November 2013 the airline ceased service to Manu'a after an aircraft broke down. Service had not resumed as of August 2014. In May 2017 the US Department of Transportation withdrew the airline's authorisation as it had not conducted scheduled passenger operations for three years.

== Destinations ==
Inter Island Airways operated daily passenger flights between Pago Pago and:

- Apia/Faleolo International Airport, Independent Samoa (international)

== Fleet ==
Inter island airways
Aircraft	In service	Orders	Passengers
Dornier 228	2	0	19
Dornier 328-110	1	0	33
