= List of airlines of Samoa =

This is a list of airlines currently operating in Samoa.

== Active ==
Airline	Image	IATA	ICAO	Callsign	Founded	Notes
Samoa Airways		PH	PAO	POLYNESIAN	1959	
Talofa Airways		TA	TAL	TALOFA	2016	

== Defunct ==
Airline	Image	IATA	ICAO	Callsign	Founded	Ceased operations	Notes
Polynesian Airlines		OL	PAO	POLYNESIAN	1959	2017	Rebranded as Samoa Airways
Polynesian Blue		DJ	PBL	BLUEBIRD	2005	2011	Rebranded as Virgin Samoa
Samoa Air		OL	SZB	SAMOA	2012	2015	
South Pacific Express			SPX		2005	2009	
Virgin Samoa		VA	VOZ	VELOCITY	2011	2017	

== See also ==
- List of airports in Samoa
- List of defunct airlines of Oceania
