= Fagaliʻi =

Village in Samoa

Fagaliʻi or Fagaliʻi-uta is a village on the island of Upolu in the Samoa archipelago approximately 5 kilometres south-east of Apia. It is in the electoral constituency of Vaimauga East (faipule district) which forms part of the larger political district of Tuamasaga.

The population of Fagaliʻi is 1439.

Fagaliʻi International Airport and the Royal Samoa Golf Course are both located nearby in Fagaliʻi Uta.

== Airport ==
Fagaliʻi Airport
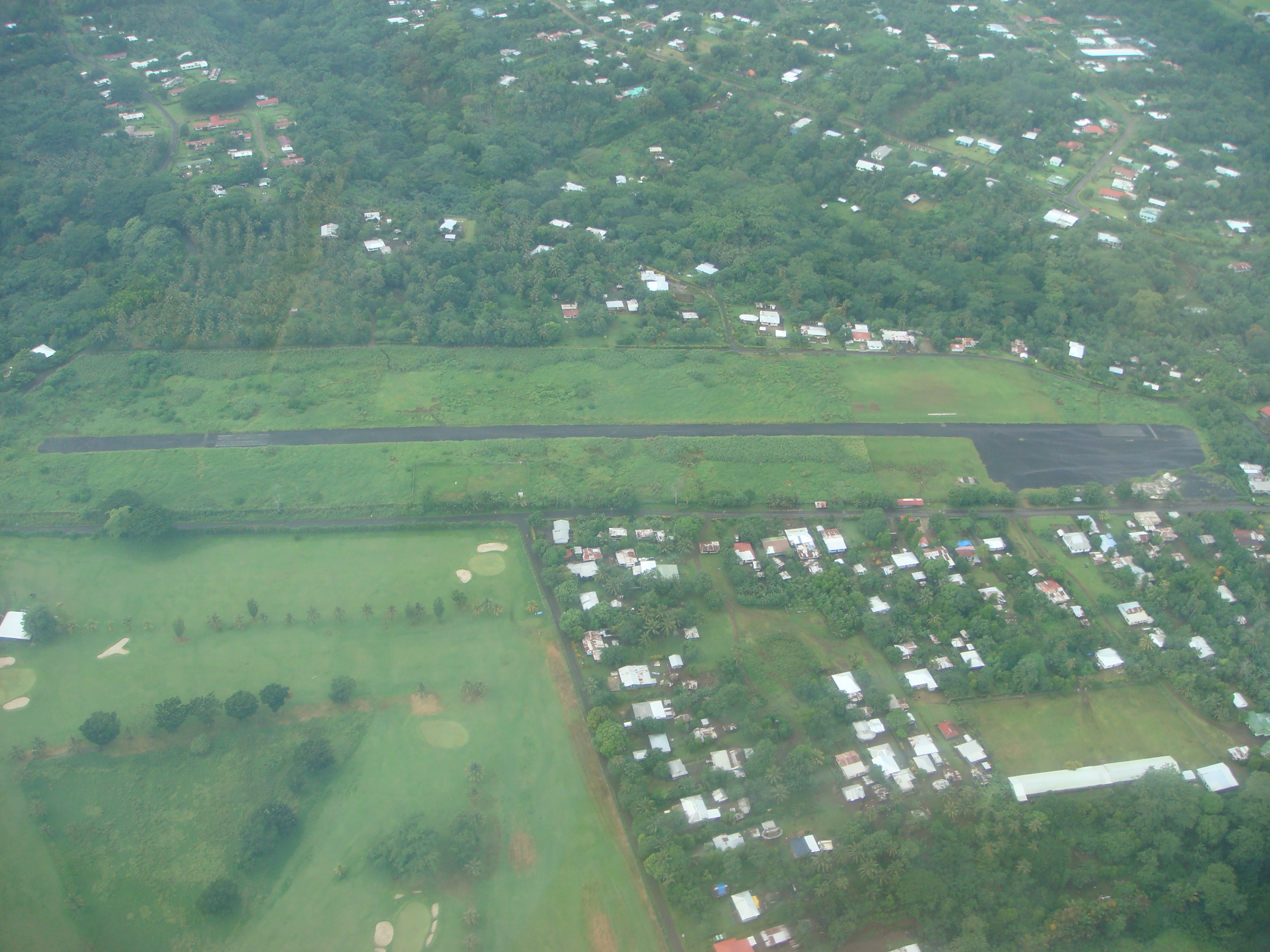
- IATA: FGI; ICAO: NSFI

Summary
- Airport type: Private
- Owner: Polynesian Airlines
- Operator: Polynesian Airlines
- Serves: Apia
- Location: Fagaliʻi-Uta
- Coordinates: 13°50′54″S 171°44′30″W
- Interactive map of Fagaliʻi Airport

Runways
Direction	Length		Surface
Direction	m	ft	Surface
10/28	670	2,198	Asphalt

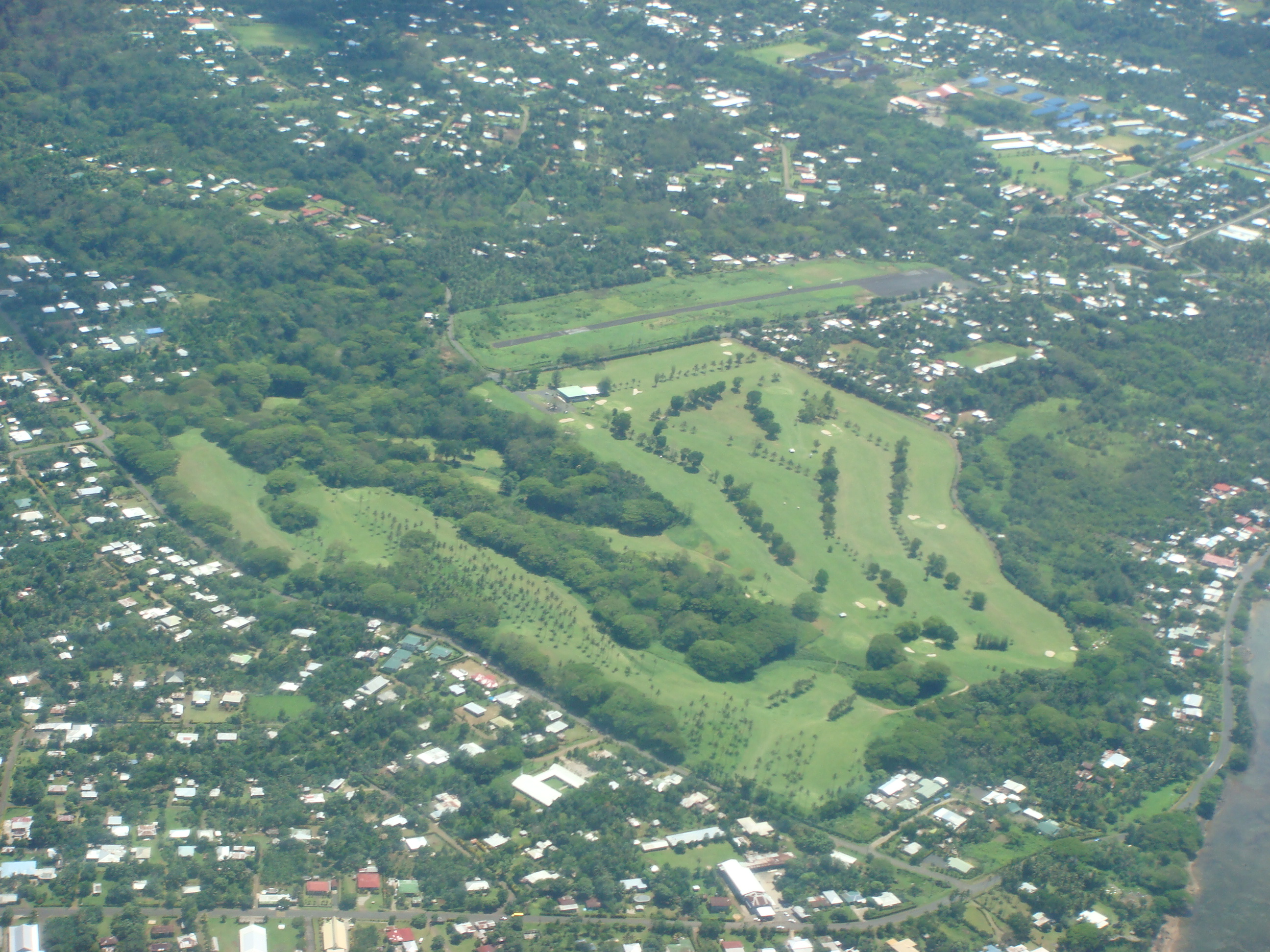
Royal Samoa Golf Course and Fagaliʻi Airport.

Fagaliʻi Airport is owned and operated by Polynesian Airlines. Fagaliʻi airstrip - at one time a grass-only airstrip, was reopened on 6 July 2002 after the airstrip was re-sealed, only to be de-commissioned in January 2005 due to Government and village concerns, allegedly due to safety and noise.

On 1 July 2009, Polynesian Airlines reopened Fagaliʻi airport and resumed a service that included international flights to Pago Pago, American Samoa.

The proposal to re-open the airport was controversial and attracted criticism both for the safety and environmental issues with the airport's configuration and for the potential burden on local communities should the scheme fail.

Airlines that have operated from the airport include:

- Polynesian Airlines
- Samoa Air

== Current operations ==
Since re-opening Fagaliʻi, Polynesian Airlines has acquired a third DHC-6 Twin Otter to better serve the Samoas in light of the cessation of services of Inter-Island Airways which operated a Pago-Pago based service to Faleolo, Samoa and the Manuʻa islands to the East of Tutuila. Samoa Airways now services the American Samoan routes with multiple weekly services to Taʻu (Fitiuta) and once weekly services to Ofu-Olosega Islands.

== Airlines and destinations ==
Airlines	Destinations
Samoa Airways	Pago Pago
Talofa Airways	Pago Pago
