= Satapuala =

Village in Aʻana, Samoa

- Village
- Location within Samoa
- Coordinates: 13°50′3″S 172°0′28″W
- Country: Samoa
- District: A'ana

Population (2016)
  - Total: 1,963
- Time zone: -11

Satapuala is a village situated on the north west coast Upolu island in Samoa. The village is part of A'ana Alofi 4 Electoral Constituency (Faipule District) which forms part of the larger political district A'ana. It has a population of 1963.

Satapuala is 40 minutes west from the country's capital Apia.

The village was relocated in 1942 to build the Faleolo International Airport. Like other land in Samoa, customary land in Satapuala was also alienated during colonialism. Customary land has since come under the government. Part of the former customary village land is where the new Aggie Grey's Lagoon Resort (the Government is the majority shareholder) has been built with a golf course beside the airport. Other Satapuala land includes a large coconut plantation opposite the airport which the government had planned to sell as small freehold lots and to build businesses and resorts. The chiefs (matai) of Satapuala have made legal claims to return customary land from the government for many years. The disputed land is the property of the government's Samoa Trust Estate Corporation (STEC, formerly WSTEC), land which came under the Samoa government when German and New Zealand colonial rule ended in Samoa.

Leading Satapuala's legal claim against the government for more than two thousand acres (8 km²) was a high chief of the village, To’alepaiali’i Toeolesulusulu Salesa III, the late Member of Parliament of the A'ana District and a prominent figure in Samoan politics. To'alepaiali'i was a Cabinet Minister in Samoa during the 1980s. He died during a trip to Sydney in November 2008.

In the early 20th century this village had also made land claims against the New Zealand colonial administration, since it wanted to put an airport on the village grounds.

Like most villages in Samoa, the geographic boundary of Satapuala covers an area from the coastline and inland. The village is separated into two sections. Satapuala-I-Tai (tai means coastal) is the end of the village nearest to the lagoon shoreline. Satapuala-I-Uta (uta means inland) is the end where most of the village people live, and also the place where the village road ends. The village of Satapuala is famous for having the historic Lapita Site.

There is one narrow and roughly paved road which connects the two ends of Satapuala-I-Uta, although in Satapuala-I-Tai the road is unpaved. The main Upolu Highway is accessible from the main village junction, or also known as the Magafa. There are a few schools in Satapuala, including district college Satapuala College. Many children from the village attend and so do those from places as far as Leulumoega to Falelatai. There is a large coconut plantation, where coconuts are used to make Samoan Brand Coconut Cream which is sold worldwide. There are some 10 family-owned shops in the village with 3 billiard gaming areas. The traditional 'Sa', evening prayers, takes place each day throughout the village and lasts for about 30 minutes. The 'Sa' is a Prayer Curfew, played throughout most of Samoa. The village is vibrant in colour and culture. Horses used for plantation work are sometimes kept in the village tied amongst the breadfruit and coconut trees. This village is abundant in crops and flowers although the thorny weed vao fefe. Television and radio broadcast reception is reasonable in the village. A few pay phones are found around Satapuala's Main Village Shops, but the majority of pay phones are found at the airport, where there is internet access. Mobile Phones are widely used and through local companies Digicel and Go Mobile. Topping Up, Credit Recharges and SIM Cards can be purchased from the local stores. There are ATM outlets at the ANZ and Westpac branches at the airport. Like most villages in Samoa, Sunday is a sacred day. Churches in the village are Catholic Church of 'Sagato Atonio' and the LDS Church, which is located across the narrow village road from the Catholic Church.The best

== 2007 South Pacific Games ==
Two of the events from the 2007 edition of the South Pacific Games were held here. Sailing and the triathlon took place in Satapuala, and due to the event, Satapuala became a busy area of the Island of Upolu too, besides Apia and Tuna'imato.

== Transport ==
The village is by the main island highway with a regular bus service. Fares to and from Satapuala are only $2 for adults and $1 for children under 12. From Apia to Satapuala the cost of a 40-minute taxi ride is approximately $40 to $50.

Ten minutes west from the village is Mulifanua Wharf where the inter-island ferry terminal is located for passenger and vehicle transport to Savai'i island. Boats to Manono or Apolima Islands are located at Manono Uta and Apolima Uta, further west on the main road past Mulifanua wharf.

Many Samoans and tourists have stood in this village since this is where the main international airport of Samoa, Faleolo International Airport, stands. On 13 January 1970, Polynesian Airlines Flight 308B, operated by Douglas C-47B 5W-FAC crashed into the sea shortly after take-off on an international non-scheduled passenger flight to Pago Pago International Airport, American Samoa. All 32 people on board were killed.

== Sport ==
Volleyball, cricket and rugby union are the most popular sports in the village especially among youths. These take place in the village 'malae', open grounds in front of the 'fale tele' main meeting houses.
