= Fagaliʻi Airport =

Airport in Fagaliʻi-Uta, Samoa

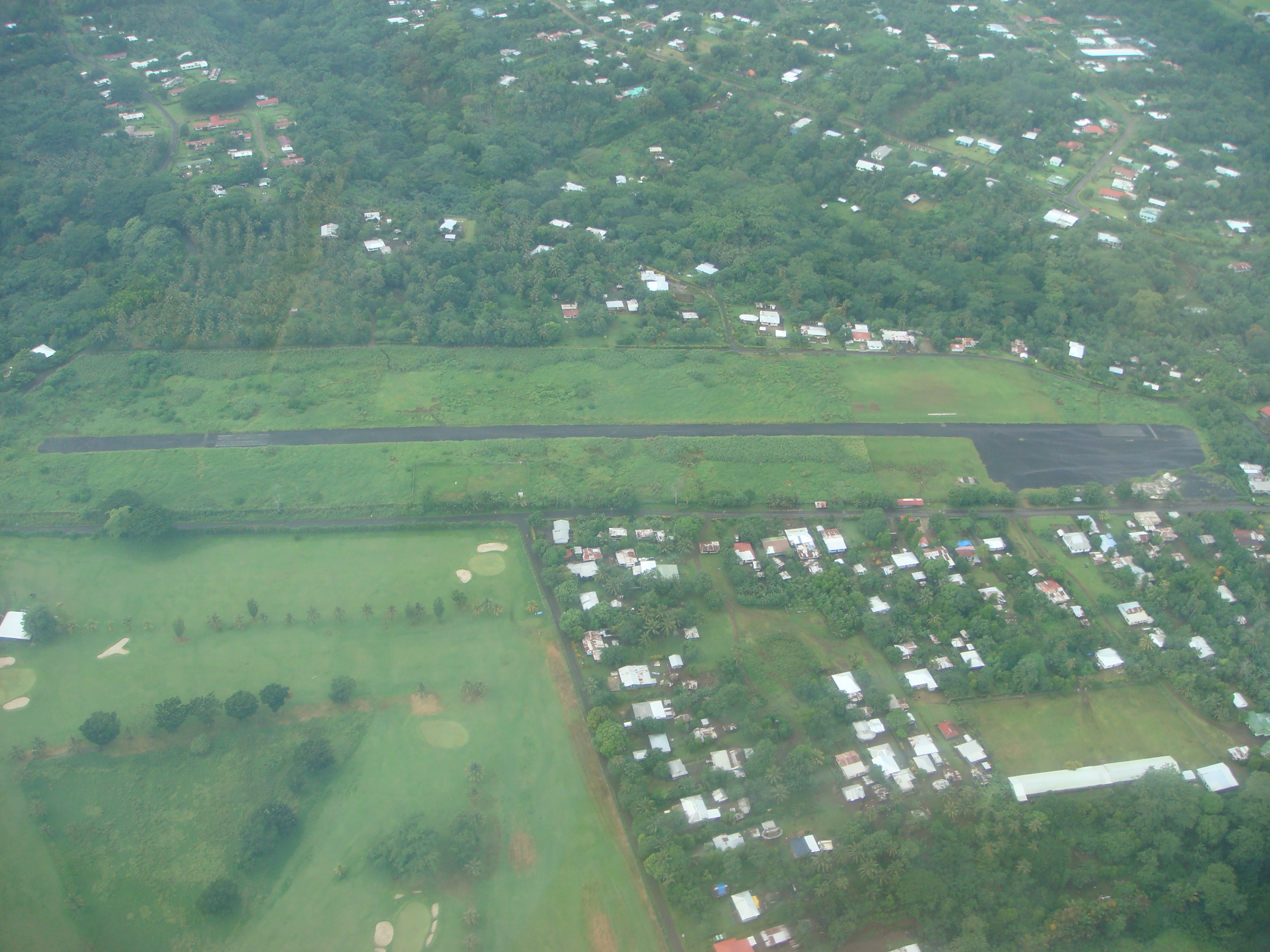
- IATA: FGI; ICAO: NSFI

Summary
- Airport type: Public
- Operator: Samoa Airport Authority
- Serves: Apia
- Location: Fagaliʻi-Uta
- Coordinates: 13°50′54″S 171°44′30″W

Map
- Location of the Airport in Samoa

Runways
Direction	Length		Surface
Direction	m	ft	Surface
10/28	710	2,329	Asphalt

Fagaliʻi Airport (IATA: FGI, ICAO: NSFI) is a regional airport located in Fagaliʻi, Samoa. It has operated intermittently since 1970, reopening in May 2023 after safety concerns caused its latest closure in December 2019.

== History ==
In 1939, the New Zealand colonial administration decided to construct two military airfields in Samoa, one each for land- and seaplanes. The land-based airfield was to be located on land from the Vailele plantation of the government-owned Reparation Estates near Fagaliʻi, and the site was surveyed. The plans were later abandoned, but in 1969 construction finally began. Flights to Pago Pago were operating by April 1970. Initially a grass-only airstrip, Fagaliʻi was paved and reopened on 6 July 2002 under the exclusive operation of Polynesian Airlines. It was shut down again in January 2005 due to Government and village concerns over safety and noise.

On 1 July 2009, Polynesian Airlines reopened Fagaliʻi Airport and resumed a service that included international flights to Pago Pago, American Samoa. The reopening of the airport was controversial and attracted criticism both for the safety and environmental issues with the airport's configuration and for the potential burden on local communities should the scheme fail. In August 2014, Polynesian Airlines opened a new VIP lounge at the airport. In December 2014, it resumed flights from Fagaliʻi to Maota Airport in Savaiʻi.

Airlines that have operated from the airport include:

- Polynesian Airlines (now Samoa Airways)
- Samoa Air
- South Pacific Island Airways
- Talofa Airways

In 2018, the Samoan Government decided that airport operations would be returned to the Samoa Airports Authority.

The airport closed for safety reasons on 31 December 2019 after failing to meet international standards. All flights were transferred to Faleolo International Airport. It was handed over to the Ministry of Police for use as a vehicle inspection site and testing range. During the COVID-19 pandemic, it was used as a COVID-19 testing site for law enforcement officers.

In August 2022, Public Enterprises Minister Leatinuu Wayne Soʻoialo confirmed plans to reopen the airport for flights to American Samoa. In September 2022, the government confirmed plans to reopen Fagaliʻi, but also assigned a minister to find an alternative site for an eventual replacement. The airport was reopened by Works, Transport, and Infrastructure Minister Olo Fiti Va'ai on 29 May 2023 following a runway extension from 670m to 710m and a renovation of the passenger terminal, with Samoa Airways resuming flights to Pago Pago.

== Airlines and destinations ==
Samoa Airways connects Fagaliʻi Airport to Pago Pago International Airport.
