= Ti'avea =

Village in Upolu, Samoa

Coordinates: 13°59′23.36″S 171°28′8.5″W

Ti'avea is a village on the island of Upolu in Samoa. It is situated inland in the north east of the island in the political district of Atua, and forms part of the Aleipata Itupa i lalo Electoral Constituency (Faipule District).

The population is 826.

== Airport project ==
In 2018 the Samoan Government announced plans for an airport with a 1000 meter runway to be constructed at Ti'avea. An initial tender for $1.3 million for construction was announced, resulting in a scandal when associate minister Peseta Vaifou Tevaga was revealed to be a part-owner of the winning company. In October 2018 the government threatened to halt construction when local villagers demanded compensation for use of their land. In April 2019 the village council and three families agreed to lease 26 hectares of customary land for the project in exchange for a $4 million payment. In June 2019 the contractor discovered problems with flooding, forcing the installation of culverts. The government admitted that the site had been chosen because of its clear flight paths, and that no other investigation had been done. In October 2019 the government announced that the airport would be used primarily for emergency landings from Fagali'i Airport, and revealed that the land chosen was a swamp. In January 2020 the government announced that the cost of the project had increased by $3 million; it later admitted that this variation had not been tendered and had also been awarded to Peseta Vaifou Tevaga's company. In April 2020, following the closure of Fagali'i, it announced that the project had been expanded to become a full international airport to provide an alternative to Faleolo International Airport. Later that month villagers agreed to relocate homes and graves to provide further space for the project.

In August 2020 an investigation revealed that the 956m runway was nearly three times too short to be used by passenger jets, with an international expert saying that Ti'avea "would not pass muster as a general aviation airport, much less an air carrier airport". Other experts criticised the lack of a control tower, fuel, and other facilities, calling the airport "a bit of land that they made into a super roadway" and alleging that it was constructed for "the political gain of a selected few". The Samoa Airports Authority responded by saying that the airport was never designed to service jet aircraft and that the project was not intended as a backup for Faleolo.

The tender to lay runway asphalt was awarded in February 2021, but work was stopped after the 2021 Samoan general election. As of April 2022 the site was abandoned, with the runway being overtaken by grass. In July 2022 Minister of Finance Mulipola Anarosa Ale Molioo announced that the project would be the subject of a "forensic audit".
