= Salesa =

Salesa is a surname. Notable people with the surname include:

- Damon Salesa (born 1972), Samoan New Zealand academic
- Jenny Salesa (born 1968), New Zealand politician
- To’alepaiali’i Toeolesulusulu Salesa III (died 2008), Samoan high chief
