= NSMA =

NSMA may refer to:

- National Sports Media Association
- Maota Airport
