= Virgin Samoa =

Samoan airline

Virgin Samoa Limited

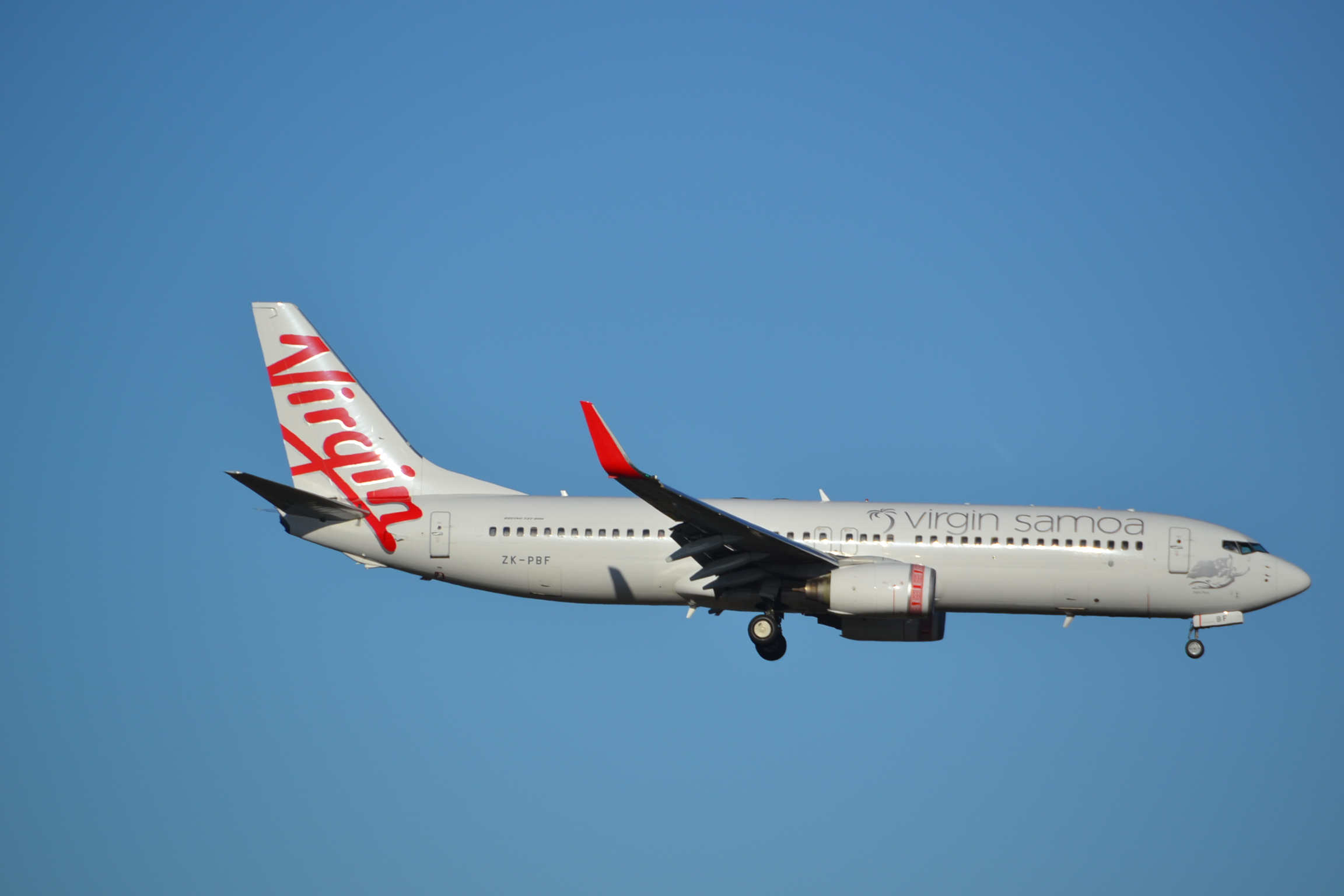
IATA	ICAO	Call sign
VA	VOZ	VELOCITY
- Commenced operations: October 31, 2005
- Ceased operations: November 12, 2017
- Hubs: Faleolo International Airport
- Frequent-flyer program: Velocity
- Fleet size: 1
- Destinations: 4
- Parent company: Virgin Australia Holdings (49%); Government of Samoa (49%); Grey Investment Group (2%)
- Headquarters: Bowen Hills, Brisbane, Australia
- Key people: Mark Pitt (CEO)
- Website: virginaustralia.com/samoa

Virgin Samoa, formerly Polynesian Blue, was the flag carrier of Samoa. It was owned by Virgin Australia Holdings (49%), the Government of Samoa (49%) and Grey Investment Group (2%). Polynesian Blue took over the long-haul flights (those involving Australia or New Zealand), which were operated by Polynesian Airlines. In December 2011, Polynesian Blue was renamed Virgin Samoa. It ceased operations on 12 November 2017.

== History ==
Polynesian Blue logo.

In 2005, Virgin Blue Holdings signed an agreement with the Government of Samoa to operate a joint venture airline. The announcement came after several months of detailed discussions between the two parties and involved the Samoan government and Virgin Blue joining forces to set up a new company to operate jet routes previously flown by Polynesian Airlines. The name Polynesian Blue was adopted in keeping with the Virgin Blue family of brands, which also included Christchurch based Pacific Blue Airlines. Its first flight was on 31 October 2005, between Apia, Auckland and Sydney.

Pacific Blue Airlines changed its ICAO code from PBI to PBN to prevent air traffic controllers from confusing the I for a 1 in flight plans. This also applies to Virgin Samoa flights operated by Virgin Australia. The ICAO code PLB (call sign: POLYBLUE) is currently reserved for the airline but not in use.

Virgin Blue Holdings rebranded its airlines under the new Virgin Australia name in 2011, later renaming itself Virgin Australia Holdings. Polynesian Blue was rebranded Virgin Samoa and a new livery was unveiled for one of the Boeing 737-800s operated by Virgin Australia (NZ) - which features traditional Samoan tattoos on the engines, designed by Tuifa’asisina Tolouena Sua. Cabin crew uniforms were also redesigned to feature the new imagery.

In 2015, Virgin Australia relinquished its New Zealand Air Operators Certificate, with all New Zealand-registered aircraft, including the Virgin Samoa-branded aircraft, transferred to the Australian register.

In May 2017, the Prime Minister of Samoa, Tuilaepa Aiono Sailele Malielegaoi, wrote to Virgin Australia advising of the government's intention to withdraw from the joint venture. This followed two years of the government's unhappiness that Samoan customers and government were not obtaining enough of the benefits from the joint venture. Virgin Australia later confirmed that services would cease on 12 November 2017. The government proposed Polynesian Airlines resume operating long-distance flights while Virgin Australia commenced operating services to Samoa on 13 November 2017 in its own right.

== Destinations ==
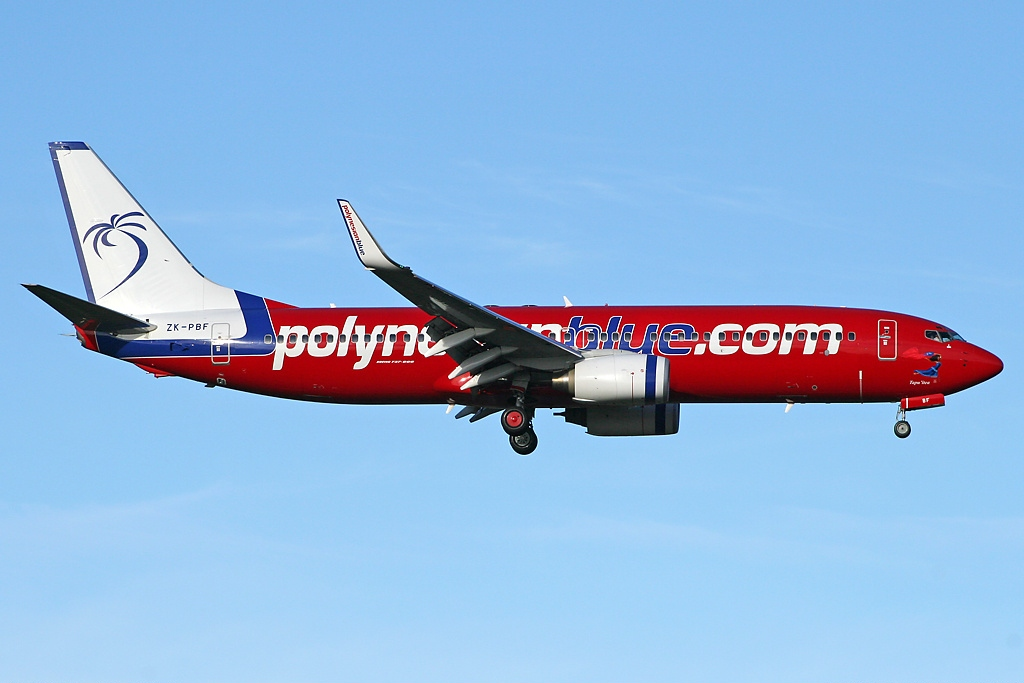
Polynesian Blue Boeing 737-800 in 2005.

Before its cessation on 12 November 2017, Virgin Samoa operated scheduled passenger flights from Apia to Brisbane, Auckland and Sydney:

Country	City	Airport	Notes
Australia	Brisbane	Brisbane Airport	
Australia	Sydney	Sydney Airport	
New Zealand	Auckland	Auckland Airport	
Samoa	Apia	Faleolo International Airport	Hub

== Fleet ==
Virgin Samoa did not own any of its own aircraft. All flights were operated on behalf of Virgin Samoa by Virgin Australia. One of their aircraft was painted in Virgin Samoa livery and named Tapu I'Tea.

Virgin Samoa fleet
Aircraft	In service	Passengers			Notes
Aircraft	In service	J	Y	Total	Notes
Boeing 737-800	1	8	168	176	
Total	1				

== See also ==
- List of airlines of Samoa
