= Toʻalepaialiʻi Toeolesulusulu Salesa III =

Samoan politician

Toʻalepaialiʻi Toeolesulusulu Salesa III (died November 2008) was a high chief (matai) of Satapuala village and a Member of Parliament of the Aʻana District in Samoa. In the late 1980s, he was a Cabinet Minister and chairman of the country's national airline, Polynesian Airlines. Toʻalepaialiʻi was also a leader of the Samoa Progressive Political Party. He was involved in a legal action against the government over a land claim by his village involving more than two thousand hectares near Faleolo International Airport.

In February 1995 he was charged with sedition over his leadership of the Tumua and Pule protest marches against the Value Added and Goods and Services Tax. The charge was dismissed in August 1995.

== See also ==
- Politics of Samoa
- Fa'amatai, chiefly system of governance in the Samoa Islands
