= Samoa Air (1987–2003) =

Passenger airline based in American Samoa (1987–2003)

IATA	ICAO	Call sign
SE	-	-
- Founded: 1987; 39 years ago
- Ceased operations: September 2003; 22 years ago
- Hubs: Pago Pago International Airport
- Fleet size: 2
- Destinations: 4
- Headquarters: Pago Pago, American Samoa

Samoa Aviation, Inc., doing business as Samoa Air, was a scheduled and charter passenger airline based in Pago Pago, American Samoa. It operated passenger flights in between American Samoa, Samoa, and Tonga.

The airline ceased to operate in September 2003 after failing to lease another aircraft and for bankruptcy protection after having operated since 1987.

== History ==
Samoa Air started operations on January 18, 1987, with a single de Havilland Canada DHC-6 Twin Otter aircraft, and purchased most of the assets of the defunct South Pacific Island Airways (SPIA) in December 1988. Its major shareholders included James and Constance Porter, Pal Air International, and Sandy Cox. Pal Air and its sister company Pace Aviation contracted with Samoa Air to supply the airline's two Twin Otter aircraft. In 1990 both Twin Otters were damaged in Niue by Cyclone Ofa. Later, the airline had a protracted litigation dispute with Pal Air and Pace Aviation over the ownership of the aircraft, which resulted in the aircraft being owned in trust by Samoa Air's lawyer for a period of time.

As of 1996, Samoa Air was operating Twin Otters between Pago Pago and the Manuʻa Islands, and a Beechcraft King Air to Vavaʻu in Tonga, as well as flights to Apia in Samoa. In January 1997 it celebrated its 10th anniversary.

In 1997, Samoa Air was reportedly studying operating commuter service in Idaho to replace discontinued service by Horizon Air, but ultimately opted not to do so.

In June 2002 the company announced plans to expand into a regional airline covering all of Polynesia. In July 2003 it attempted to raise capital for a jet service to Honolulu.

In September 2003 it ceased all operations after failing to lease another aircraft to replace its sole Twin Otter, which was scheduled for maintenance. After failing to secure further investors, it sought bankruptcy protection in December 2003. This occurred during a pending lawsuit in the High Court of American Samoa, which was settled on 2 December 2003, by Pratt & Whitney for unpaid rent and damages to leased aircraft engines which they returned with missing parts. This led them to be charged over $370,000 for the damages to the engines. At the time of its dissolution in 2003 it did two flights daily to the islands of Manu'a, one daily service to Samoa, and weekly flights to Tonga.

== See also ==
- List of defunct airlines of the United States
