= South Pacific Island Airways =

IATA	ICAO	Call sign
HK	SPI	SOUTH PACIFIC
- Founded: 1973; 53 years ago
- Ceased operations: 1987; 39 years ago
- Hubs: Pago Pago International Airport; Honolulu International Airport
- Focus cities: Pago Pago; Apia; Hagåtña
- Fleet size: 8
- Destinations: 18
- Headquarters: Honolulu, Hawaii, United States
- Key people: George Wray (CEO)

South Pacific Island Airways (SPIA) was an airline operating flights in the Pacific including American Samoa and Hawaii with service to the west coast of U.S. and Canada as well as to Alaska, New Zealand, Guam and Tahiti from 1973 to 1987.

== History ==
SPIA was founded and wholly owned for most of its existence by George Wray. Wray was an attorney who relocated his practice to American Samoa in the 1960s, and began an inter-island air service in the early 1970s using a Piper Cherokee Six aircraft.

SPIA received Part 135 charter/commuter carrier certification in 1973, followed by Part 121 scheduled carrier certification in 1981. It was a frequent operator of military charter flights to Polynesia and Micronesia.

The Federal Aviation Administration (FAA) began an investigation of SPIA in August 1983, initially focused on its maintenance activities in Honolulu. After several inspections, the FAA began the process of suspending SPIA's Part 121 certificate in May 1984, and ordered a 30-day suspension of both operating certificates on September 28, which SPIA appealed while continuing to operate.

On the next day, September 29, a transatlantic SPIA charter flight almost flew into the airspace of the Soviet Union near the heavily militarized Kola Peninsula, before being intercepted by Norwegian fighter planes. The incident became known to the FAA on October 7, and on October 12 the FAA issued an emergency order immediately shutting down the airline. SPIA appealed the shutdown order with the support of the American Samoa government, but it became effective on October 22, 1984.

SPIA filed for new operating certificates and was re-certified under Part 121 on January 29, 1985. Its Part 135 certification was restored on March 25, 1985. However, the Part 121 fleet was grounded again on May 29, 1985 due to compliance issues in SPIA's acquisition of hush kits for its Boeing 707 jetliners. This left SPIA with only two commuter aircraft operating under Part 135.

While the airline's operational difficulties were ongoing in 1984, Wray suffered a swimming accident that left him paralyzed from the neck down, and day-to-day operational control shifted to Mary Phillips. In the first half of 1985, SPIA failed to pay withholding taxes to the IRS, resulting in litigation and a six-figure judgment against Wray. The judgment was upheld on appeal in 1996.

By 1986, SPIA was in Chapter 11 bankruptcy proceedings and the IRS was seeking a liquidation of the airline for failure to pay its taxes. A new CEO, Brian Cooke, was appointed in August, but Wray continued to run the airline behind the scenes and control its bank accounts.

SPIA entered liquidation on February 28, 1987, and most of its remaining assets were acquired by Samoa Air in October 1988.

== Former destinations ==
South Pacific Island Airways served these destinations during its existence primarily flying Boeing 707 jet aircraft although small de Havilland Canada DHC-6 Twin Otter turboprops were used for feeder service as well:

=== Canada ===
- Vancouver, British Columbia – Vancouver International Airport

=== Fiji ===
- Suva – Nausori International Airport

=== Tahiti ===
- Papeete – Fa'a'a International Airport

=== Tonga ===
- Nuku'alofa – Fua'amotu International Airport
- Lifuka – Lifuka Island Airport (Salote Pilolevu Airport)
- Neiafu – Vavaʻu International Airport (Lupepauʻu Airport)

=== New Zealand ===
- Auckland, New Zealand – Auckland International Airport

==== Cook Islands ====
- Rarotonga – Rarotonga International Airport

=== Palau ===
- Koror – Roman Tmetuchl International Airport

=== Papua New Guinea ===
- Port Moresby, Papua New Guinea – Jacksons International Airport

=== United States ===
- Anchorage, Alaska – Ted Stevens Anchorage International Airport
- Honolulu, Hawaii – Honolulu International Airport

==== American Samoa ====
- Pago Pago – Pago Pago International Airport
- Ofu-Olosega American Samoa – Ofu Airport
- Tau, American Samoa – Tau Airport

==== Guam ====
- Hagåtña – Antonio B. Won Pat International Airport

==== Northern Mariana Islands ====
- Rota – Benjamin Taisacan Manglona International Airport
- Saipan – Francisco C. Ada/Saipan International Airport
- Tinian – Tinian International Airport

== Fleet ==
As its peak South Pacific Island Airways fleet included:

South Pacific Island Airways
Type	Number
Britten-Norman BN-2 Islander	1
de Havilland Canada DHC-6 Twin Otter	3
Boeing 707	4

== Accidents and incidents ==
- On July 21, 1984, South Pacific Island Airways Flight 513, a de Havilland Canada DHC-6 Twin Otter carrying 14 occupants, crashed upon landing at Tau Airport. While on final approach to the airport, the flight controls suddenly collapsed forward, and the nose of the aircraft pitched up. The Twin Otter then collided with a terminal building and a vehicle. One passenger died; the other 10 passengers and all 3 crew members survived. The investigation revealed that the elevator control cable was rusted, corroded, and broken due to inadequate inspection. The cable pulley in the area was also damaged. The corrosion of the control cable was worsened by the fact that the aircraft was operated in a humid and salty environment.

== See also ==
- List of defunct airlines of the United States
