= Talofa Airways =

Airline of Samoa

IATA	ICAO	Call sign
TA	TAL	TALOFA
- Commenced operations: 29 August 2016; 10 years ago
- Operating bases: Faleolo International Airport (Apia)
- Fleet size: 3
- Destinations: 2
- Headquarters: Apia, Samoa
- Key people: Toleafoa Jeffrey Hunter (CEO)
- Website: www.talofaairways.com

Talofa Airways is a Samoan airline that offers flights within the Polynesian region between Samoa and American Samoa. It started operations in August 2016 using two Rockwell 690B Turbo Commander aircraft, and added a third to its fleet in October 2023.

== History ==
Toleafoa Jeffrey Hunter, the founder of Talofa Airways, first had plans to set up an airline business in the region in 1996, when he decided to remain in Samoa rather than return to the United States. After opening a pharmacy in Apia in 2002, Hunter began to invest towards establishing Talofa Airways, which would provide more convenient air travel between Samoa, American Samoa and other islands in Polynesia. He selected the Rockwell 690B Turbo Commander in a nine-seat configuration for the airline's fleet. In order to avoid the high costs of transporting the aircraft to Samoa, Hunter flew the aircraft from Florida himself.

On 22 August 2016, the airline held an inauguration ceremony at Apia's Fagali'i Airport with Samoan Prime Minister Tuilaepa Aiono Sailele Malielegaoi in attendance. Talofa Airways began operations on 29 August 2016, becoming the third airline based in Samoa after Polynesian Airlines and Samoa Air.

== Corporate affairs ==
The airline takes its name from the traditional Samoan greeting Talofa, signifying Talofa Airways' Samoan roots. It is headquartered in Taufusi, Apia. Toleafoa Jeffrey Hunter serves as the chairman and chief executive officer.

== Destinations ==
As of June 2025, Talofa Airways flies to the following destinations:

Country	City	IATA	ICAO	Airport	Begins	Ends	Refs
American Samoa	Pago Pago	PPG	NSTU	Pago Pago International Airport	2016	Present	
Samoa	Apia	APW	NSFA	Faleolo International Airport	2016	Present	
Tonga	Tongatapu	TBU	NFTF	Fuaʻamotu International Airport	2016	2024	

== Fleet ==
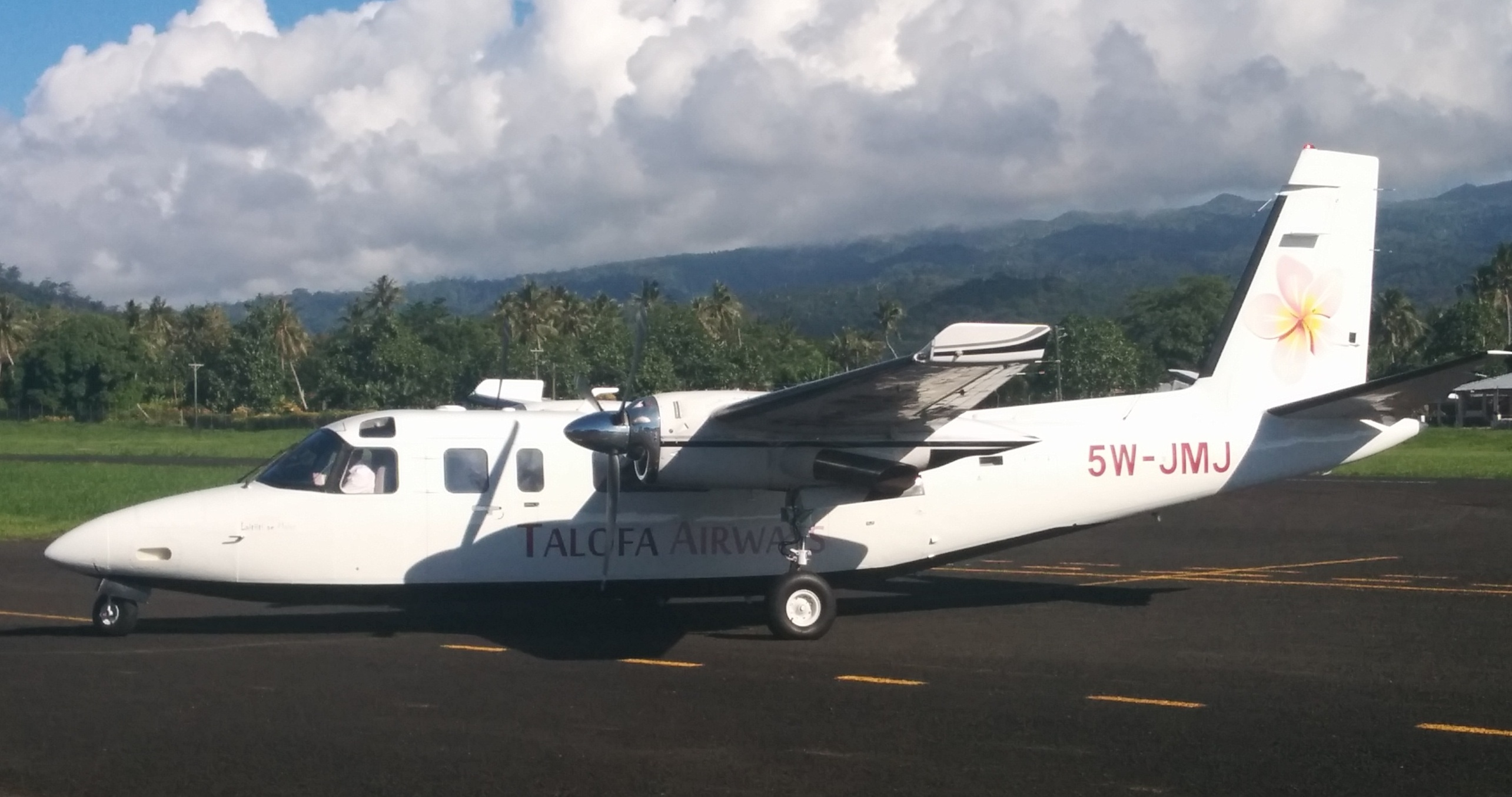
A Talofa Airways Rockwell 690B Turbo Commander at Fagali'i Airport, Apia

As of June 2025, Talofa Airways operates the following aircraft:

Talofa Airways fleet
Aircraft	In service	Orders	Passengers	Notes
Rockwell 690B Turbo Commander	3	—	9	—
Total	3	0		

== Accidents and incidents ==
- On 12 January 2017, a Talofa Airways Rockwell 690B Turbo Commander was involved in an accident after a normal landing at Pago Pago International Airport (American Samoa). There were no reported injuries or fatalities.
- On 24 July 2024 a Talofa Airways Rockwell 690B Turbo Commander broke its front wheel on landing at Pago Pago International Airport. None of the eight passengers were injured.
