= Sapa'u Ruperake Petaia =

Samoan writer

Sapa'u Ruperake Petaia (born 11 April 1951) is a poet and writer from Samoa. His poem Blue Rain became the title of a collection of his poems first published in 1980 with later editions in the 1990s. The collection included the satirical poem Kidnapped (1974) which explores themes about the loss of traditional Samoan knowledge. Like other Samoan writers such as Albert Wendt, Petaia's work explores themes about the effects of colonialism and Western influences on Samoan culture and society.

Petaia was born in Samoa. He attended Samoa College and worked as a clerk in the Public Service Commission in 1973. In 1978 he won a government scholarship to study at the University of the South Pacific in Fiji. In 1980, he graduated with a B.A. in Public Administration and Economic Geography. He returned to Samoa where he has since continued to work in the public service in management roles.

In 1992, his poetry Patches of the Rainbow was published in the Samoa Observer.

Petaia witnessed the 1994 two-wheeled landing of Polynesian Airlines Flight PH844 at Faleolo International Airport, and wrote The Miracle based on a number of passenger accounts of the event.
