= Samoa Air =

Passenger airline of Samoa (2012–2015)

IATA	ICAO	Call sign
OL	SZB	SAMOA
- Founded: 2012
- Ceased operations: 2015
- Hubs: Faleolo International Airport
- Focus cities: Asau, Salelologa
- Fleet size: 2
- Destinations: 10
- Headquarters: Apia, Samoa
- Key people: Chris Langton (CEO)
- Website: www.samoaair.ws

Samoa Air was a small airline from Samoa that operated scheduled flights between the domestic islands as well as to American Samoa. It also provided charter flights and medical transfer flights. The airline appears to have become dormant in 2015; its website is blank and its Facebook page is no longer updated.

== Incidents ==
On 21 June 2012, a Samoa Air aircraft almost collided with a Polynesian Airlines aircraft near Fagali'i. Both aircraft were on the same flight path. Civil Aviation issued a stern warning to Samoa Air for failing to follow standard operating procedures. Samoa Air's CEO, Chris Langton, disputed the outcome of the investigation.

== Pay by weight ==
Samoa Air gained global press coverage by becoming the first airline in the world to charge customers by body weight plus luggage.

The fare is calculated by multiplying a base fare (depending on the route flown) by the total weight of the passenger plus their luggage. So a passenger flying from Apia to Asau weighing 80 kg (180 lb) and carrying 20 kg (44 lb) of luggage would pay US$132 for the flight (100 kg x US$1.32 base fare), while another passenger weighing 60 kg (130 lb) and traveling without luggage would pay US$79.20 (60 kg x US$1.32 base fare) for the same flight. Children are charged in the same way at a 75% rate.

== Fleet ==
Samoa Air fleet
Aircraft	Total	Orders	Passengers
Britten-Norman Islander	0 - Decommissioned	—	9
Cessna 172	2	—	3
Total	2	—	
