= Asau Airport =

Airport in Samoa

- IATA: AAU; ICAO: NSAU

Summary
- Airport type: Public
- Serves: Asau, Savai'i, Samoa
- Coordinates: 13°30′18″S 172°37′40″W

Map
- Location of airport in Samoa

Asau Airport (IATA: AAU, ICAO: NSAU) is a small domestic airfield located in the thick dense jungle at the northwest end of Savai'i in Samoa. The airport is in the village of Asau and mainly services chartered flights. The original airport was constructed in 1969. It was washed away by Cyclone Ofa in 1990, and the current airport was built to replace it in 1999.

After being closed for six years the airport reopened in April 2021.

== Facilities ==
There is only one rigid and roughly surfaced runway. There are no runway lights, and there is no watch tower. Asau Airport, however, is under the main Sky Watch Tower at Faleolo International Airport on Upolu.

Only Twin Otter and Britten-Norman Islander planes can land and take off this small airport, generally because the runway and tarmac cannot handle any other larger and heavier aircraft.

The small tarmac can only fit two Twin Otter planes, with an aircraft parking shed located near the tarmac. Another small shed serves as the airport terminal.

== 2003 Disaster ==
In 2003, a cyclone swept past Samoa and most of the South Pacific. Asau was badly affected and the airport suffered serious damage. Since 2006, the airport has been shut, and all passengers who wished to go to Asau had to go through Maota Airport.

Since then, the airport terminal was rebuilt and a new paved runway was installed. It is still uncertain whether the new runway is up to international standards.

== Former airlines and destinations ==
The airport formerly served flights to and from Maota Airport, the main airstrip on Savai'i at the east end of the island, Faleolo International Airport on the main island Upolu, and Pago Pago, American Samoa.
