= Fitiuta Airport =

- IATA: FTI; ICAO: NSFQ; FAA LID: FAQ

Summary
- Airport type: Public
- Owner: Government of American Samoa
- Serves: Ta'u Island
- Location: Fitiuta, American Samoa, United States
- Time zone: Samoa Time Zone (UTC-11:00)
- Elevation AMSL: 34 m (112 ft)
- Coordinates: 14°12′58″S 169°25′25″W
- Website: http://americansamoaport.as.gov/airport-ppg/manu-a-airports.html

Map
- Location within American Samoa

Runways
Direction	Length		Surface
Direction	m	ft	Surface
12/30	975	3,200	Concrete

Statistics (2002)
- Aircraft operations: 2,832
- Source: Federal Aviation Administration

Fitiuta Airport (IATA: FTI, ICAO: NSFQ, FAA LID: FAQ) is a public airport located in Fiti‘uta, a village on the island of Ta‘ū in American Samoa, an unincorporated territory of the United States. Fitiuta Airport replaced Tau Airport (located in the village of Tau), which was officially deactivated after the construction and activation of Fitiuta Airport in 1990. The Fitiuta airport is owned by the Government of American Samoa.

Although most U.S. airports are assigned the same three-letter location identifier by both the FAA and IATA, Fitiuta Airport is assigned FAQ by the FAA and FTI by the IATA (which assigned FAQ to Frieda River Airport in Papua New Guinea). The airport's ICAO identifier is NSFQ.

== Facilities and aircraft ==
Fitiuta Airport has one paved runway designated 12/30 which measures 975 m × 23 m (3,200 ft × 75 ft). For 12-month period ending May 29, 2015, the airport had 1,130 aircraft operations (an average of 3 per day), 100% of which were air taxi flights. Fitiuta airport also has a fully functioning fire-crash station (activated in 2011), lighted runway and operates as a Part 139 airport.

== Airlines and destinations ==
Samoa Airways connects Fitiuta Airport to Pago Pago International Airport.

== See also ==
- List of airports in American Samoa
