= Tau Airport =

Airport in American Samoa

- IATA: TAV; ICAO: none; FAA LID: HI36

Summary
- Airport type: Private
- Owner: Private Individuals
- Location: Tau, American Samoa, United States
- Elevation AMSL: 56 m / 185 ft
- Coordinates: 14°13′45″S 169°30′40″W

Map

Runways
Direction	Length		Surface
Direction	m	ft	Surface
18/36	661	2,170	Coral

Statistics (1989)
- Aircraft operations: 4,380
- Source: Federal Aviation Administration

Tau Airport (IATA: TAV, FAA LID: HI36) was a privately owned, private-use airport located 1.6 kilometers (0.99 mi) southeast of the village of Ta‘ū on the island of Ta‘ū in American Samoa, an unincorporated territory of the United States. The airport was located in the northwest corner of Ta‘ū island. Tau Airport was deactivated in 1990, and was replaced by Fitiuta Airport, located on the northeast side of the island. Satellite imagery from 2015 does not appear to show any remnants of the airport.

== Facilities and aircraft ==
Tau Airport previously covered an area of 1.6 hectares (4 acres) and had one runway (18/36) measuring 661 m × 30 m (2,170 ft × 100 ft). The runway surface was compacted coral in the center 15 meters (50 ft), with the rest of runway composed of dirt and grass.

According to the last issued FAA data, for 12-month period ending March 8, 1989, the airport had 4,380 aircraft operations, an average of 12 per day: 67% general aviation and 33% air taxi.
