= Maota Airport =

Airport in Samoa

Maota (Salelologa) Airport
- IATA: MXS; ICAO: NSMA

Summary
- Airport type: Public
- Serves: Salelologa, Savai'i, Samoa
- Coordinates: 13°44′32″S 172°15′30″W

Maps
- Location of airport in Samoa MXS (Pacific Ocean)
- Interactive map of Maota (Salelologa) Airport

Runways
Direction	Length		Surface
Direction	m	ft	Surface
	700	2,297	Asphalt
- Source: DAFIF

Maota Airport (IATA: MXS, ICAO: NSMA) is the main domestic airport on the island of Savai'i in Samoa. It is situated near Salelologa at the east end of Savai'i. The airport is located 10 minutes south of Salelologa township and ferry terminal. The airport has been in operation since the early 1990s. It was tar-sealed in 1994, and declared a customs port of entry in 1997. In the past, the airport has served flights from Faleolo International Airport on the main island Upolu and Asau Airport at the northwest end of Savai'i, but domestic flights were discontinued before 2000. The airport was refurbished in late 2020, and Samoa Airways resumed domestic flights in September that year.

== Facilities ==
The airport has a short runway suitable for Twin Otter and other small passenger aircraft. The airport terminal is an open fale. Landings are limited to daylight hours due to a lack of lighting. A small control tower exists directed from the control tower at Faleolo on Upolu.

== Airlines and destinations ==
Samoa Airways flies into this airport from Apia
