= Pago Pago International Airport =

Airport in American Samoa

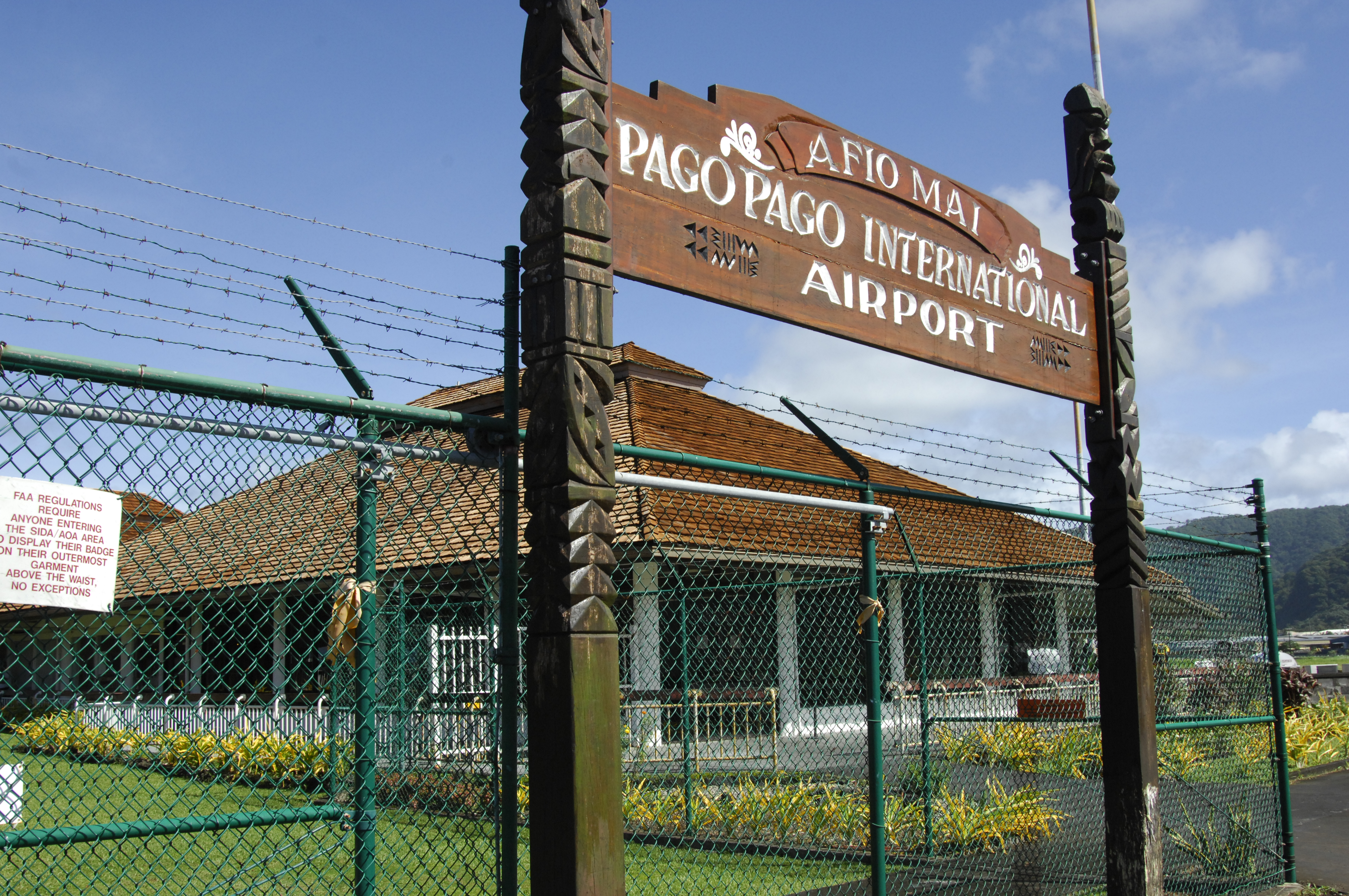
- Sign at terminal entrance
- IATA: PPG; ICAO: NSTU; FAA LID: PPG

Summary
- Airport type: Public
- Owner: American Samoan Government
- Operator: Department of Port Administration
- Serves: Pago Pago
- Location: Pago Pago, American Samoa, United States
- Elevation AMSL: 32 ft (9.8 m)
- Coordinates: 14°19′41″S 170°42′43″W
- Website: PPG website

Maps
- FAA airport diagram
- Interactive map of Pago Pago International Airport

Runways
Direction	Length		Surface
Direction	ft	m	Surface
05/23	10,000	3,048	Asphalt
08/26	3,800	1,158	Asphalt

Statistics (2010)
- Passengers: 68,300
- Passenger change 09–10: ▲0.4%
- Aircraft movements: 6,841
- Movements change 09–10: ▲0.3%
- Source: 2010 World Airport Traffic Report, Federal Aviation Administration

Pago Pago International Airport (IATA: PPG, ICAO: NSTU, FAA LID: PPG), also known as Tafuna Airport, is a public airport located 7 miles (11.3 km) southwest of the central business district of Pago Pago, in the village and plains of Tafuna on the island of Tutuila in American Samoa, an unincorporated territory of the United States.

3,099 flights arrived at Pago Pago International Airport in 2014, down from 3,665 in 2013. Incoming flights carried 55,728 passengers in 2014, while flights carrying 57,355 passengers took off from the airport. 1,800,000 pounds (820,000 kg) of cargo and 1,300,000 pounds (590,000 kg) of mail were brought in by commercial carriers.

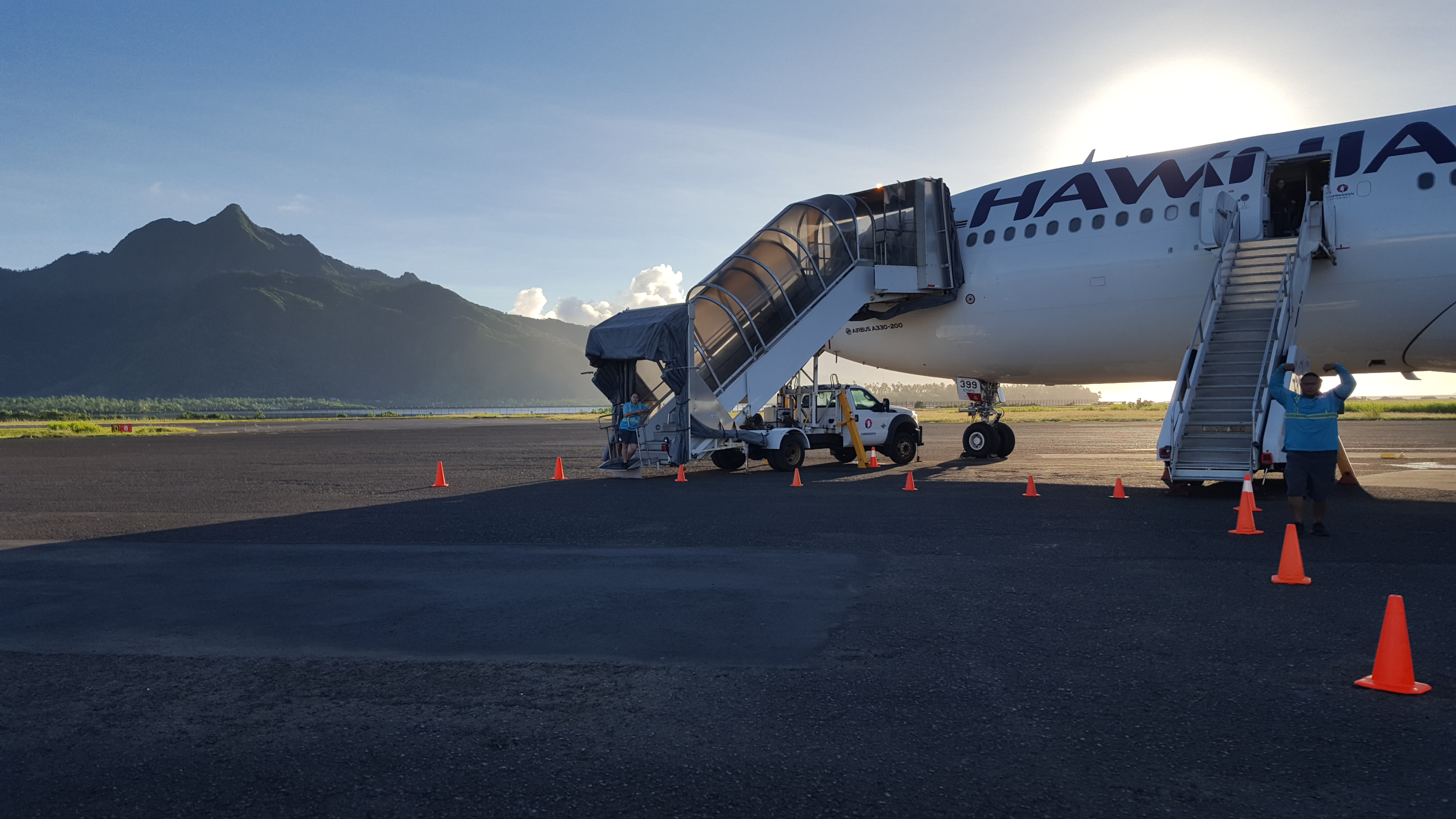
Hawaiian Airlines flights leave from Pago Pago International Airport 2–3 times per week.

== History ==
=== Tafuna Airfield ===
The site and location of the current airport was originally known as Tafuna Airfield. It was part of U.S. Naval Station Tutuila – Samoa Defense Group Area and was partially constructed before war broke out in the Pacific on December 7, 1941. Two airstrips were completed and opened on March 17, 1942.

The airfield was first utilized on March 19, 1942, by U.S. Marine Fighting Squadron VMF-111 which arrived by ship from San Diego, California. VMF-111 aircraft were off loaded in Pago Pago harbor and trucked to Tafuna airfield. The first planes from MAG-13 also arrived at Tafuna Airfield on April 2, 1942 at which point they assumed responsibility for the air defense of American Samoa. Marine Torpedo Bombing Squadron VMO-151 arrived in early May 1942 at Tafuna Airfield where all three squadrons were based during the early part of the Pacific War. VMF-111 was eventually transitioned and based at Faleolo Airfield in Western (British) Samoa after Faleolo airfield was completed in July 1942 to protect Upolu and Savai'i islands.

WW II to pre-1964 runways
Runway	length	Width	Type	Operational years	Usage
9/27	6,080 feet (1,853 m)	500 feet (152 m)	Compact Coral	1942–1964	Primary runway
14/32	3,000 feet (914 m)	200 feet (61 m)	Compact Coral	1942–1950	Secondary runway

The original runway alignments were 09/27 (6,080 feet (1,853 m) x 500 feet (152 m)) and 14/32 (3,000 feet (914 m) x 200 feet (61 m)) and were constructed of compact coral with capability to handle 65 fighter aircraft and 12 medium to heavy bombers. The runways were lighted. The main terminal airfield buildings, a large hangar and control tower were located at the edge of today's runway 08/26 and at what is today the Tafuna Industrial Park area.

=== Leone Airfield ===
In conjunction with the airstrip at Tafuna, an emergency Bomber airstrip was also constructed in the village of Leone, known then as Leone Airfield in early 1943. It was situated on what is today Leone High School and Midkiff Elementary School on the western edge of Tutuila Island. Leone Airfield was 6,000 feet (1,829 m) x 500 feet (152 m) and was completed on September 30, 1943. It had a short life during the war. The airfield was abandoned in early 1945 due to turbulent air currents and lack of use. Only two aircraft were recorded to have landed and taken off from the airfield. A visual outline of Leone Airfield can be seen from the air today with a straight clearance road starting from the WVUV (AM) radio tower to Midkiff Elementary School.

=== Pago Pago International Airport ===
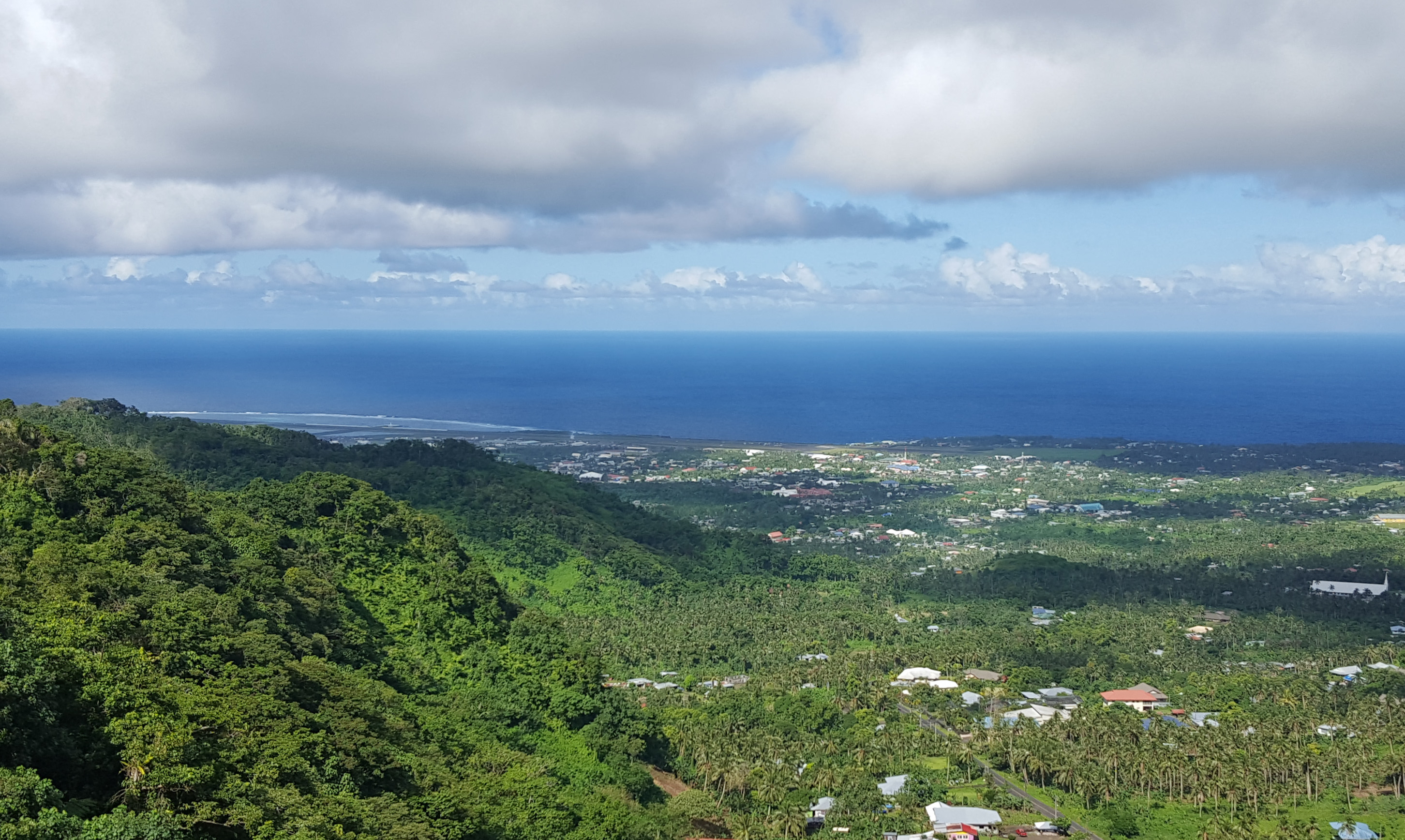
Pago Pago International Airport, as seen from A'oloau facing south, is on the left-hand side along the water.

==== Pre-jet service ====
Pago Pago International Airport and the original Tafuna Airfield military facilities were first used for commercial trans pacific air service in January 1956 when Pan American Airways added Pago Pago to its network, initially serving it via Fiji. Prior to this, there was no air service to American Samoa whatsoever. A trip required a nine-hour boat ride from Western Samoa. Pan American utilized Douglas DC-4s.

Pre-jet/pre-1964 airlines
Started	Ended	Airline name	Aircraft	Route
1956	1965	Pan American Airways	DC-4 & DC-7	Honolulu / Canton Island / Pago Pago / Sydney and Auckland
1959	1970	Polynesian Airlines	DC-3	Apia (Faleolo) / Pago Pago
1959	1960	Samoan Airlines	DC-3	Apia (Faleolo) / Pago Pago
1961	1965	TEAL (Air New Zealand)	DC-6 & Lockheed L-188 Electra	Auckland / Nadi / Pago Pago / Papeete
1962	1963	South Pacific Air Lines	L-1049 Super Constellation	Honolulu / Papeete

It was also used for inter island air service between Faleolo, Western Samoa and Pago Pago in 1959 by newly formed, Apia-based Polynesian Airlines.

Also in July 1959, Samoan Airlines (founded by Larry Coleman, brother of Peter Tali Coleman, then Governor of American Samoa) started service to Apia with a DC-3. The service lasted until October 1960, before Hawaiian Airlines repossessed the aircraft it leased Samoan for unpaid rent.

Tasman Empire Airways Limited, or TEAL, the predecessor to what is now Air New Zealand, started flying to Pago Pago in 1961.

South Pacific Air Lines started service in 1962 from Honolulu, sometimes also to Papeete, until December 1963 when it turned the service over to Pan Am.

==== The jet age ====
Pago Pago International Airport went through major re-construction in 1963 under the U.S. President Kennedy administration. The WW II military-era runway designated 14/32 was converted to a taxiway and ramp area, and a new runway was constructed and designated 05/23 with a paved length of 9,000 feet (2,743 m) and width of 150 feet (46 m).

Evolution of runways at Pago Tafuna Airfield
Runway	length	Width	Type	Operational years	Last major improvement	Usage	Max. type aircraft
9/27	6,080 feet (1,853 m)	500 feet (152 m)	Compact coral	1942–1964 (Closed)	1950 (sealed tar runway)	Primary runway	DC-7 and Lockheed L-188 Electra
5/23	9,000 feet (2,743 m)	150 feet (46 m)	Asphalt	1964 – current	2001 (runway extension)	Primary runway	Boeing 747 / Lockheed C-5 Galaxy
14/32	3,000 feet (914 m)	200 feet (61 m)	Compact coral	1942–1950 (converted to taxiway to runway 5/23 in 1963)	1942	Secondary runway	Small WW II fighter aircraft

The terminal buildings at the airport were dedicated on November 23, 1965. Dignitaries attending included Senator Henry M. Jackson, Chairman of the Senate Committee on Interior and Insular Affairs; Representative Michael J. Kirwan, Chairman of the House Subcommittee on Appropriations, Interior and Insular Affairs; Malietoa Tanumafili II; and Prince Tāufaʻāhau Tupou IV, Prime Minister of Tonga.

Runway designation 09/27 which was the primary runway for commercial air service in the 1950s and early 1960s was deactivated after the newer, longer runway 05/23 was open for aircraft flights. Pago Pago International Airport was opened to jet service in 1964 to stimulate tourism and a new local economy.

==== Trans Pacific jet service and height of commercial aviation ====
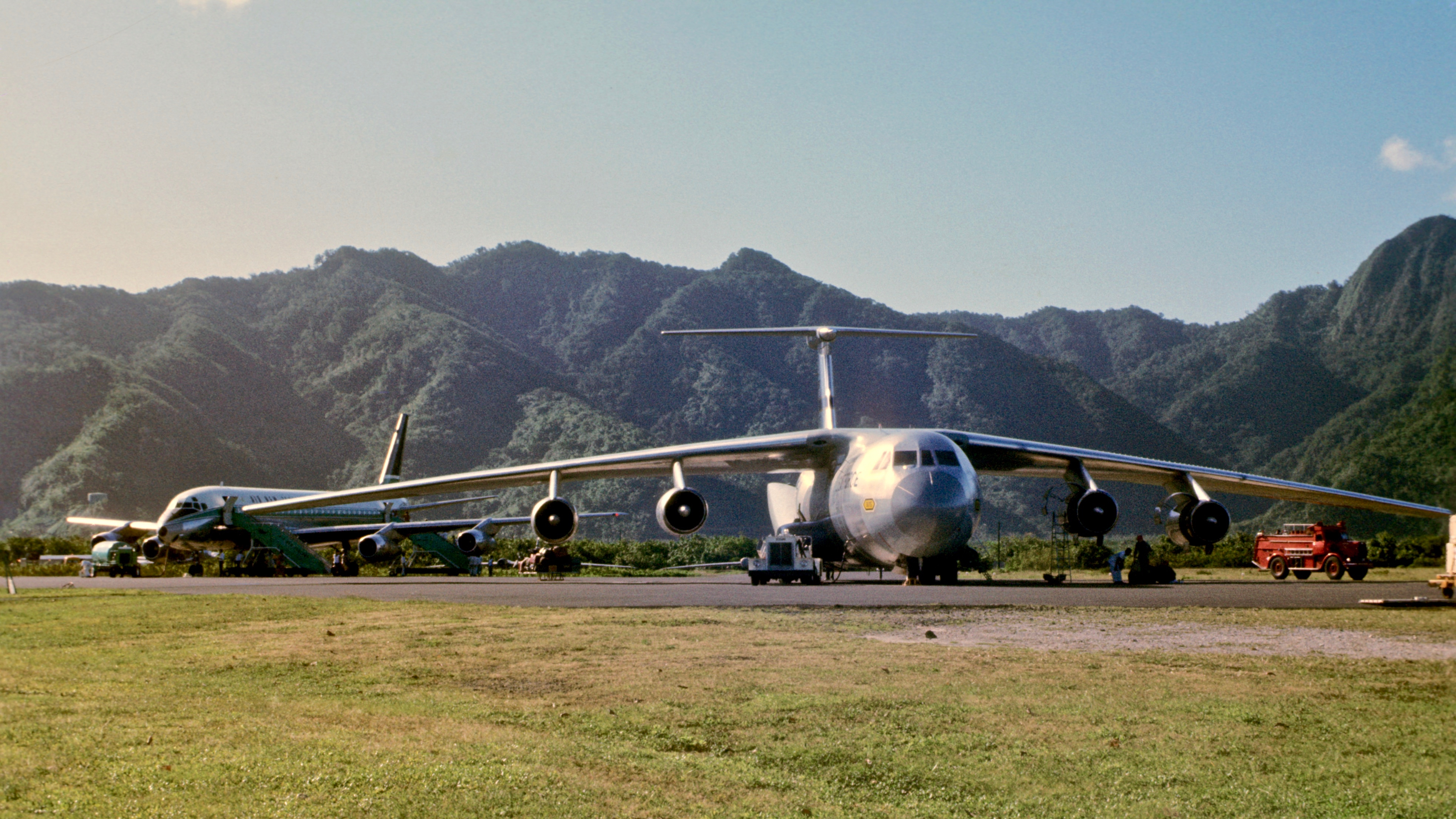
A USAF C-141 at Pago Pago International Airport in July 1968. An Air New Zealand DC-8 is loading passengers in the background.

South Pacific jet services between Sydney (Australia), Auckland (New Zealand), Honolulu (Hawaii) and Papeete (Tahiti) were first offered by Pan American World Airways in 1964 using Boeing 707 aircraft. Air New Zealand, which was already flying the Auckland / Nadi / Pago Pago / Papeete route using Lockheed L-188 Electra aircraft shifted to Douglas DC-8 aircraft in November 1965. In 1970 American Airlines began flying the Honolulu / Pago Pago / Sydney route using Boeing 707 aircraft. UTA French Airlines began Douglas DC-10 service in 1975 between Noumea, New Caledonia and Papeete, Tahiti via Pago Pago. Continental Airlines also began DC-10 service from Honolulu to Sydney and Auckland via Pago Pago in 1979.

Pago Pago International Airport went through its peak in aviation between 1975 and 1985. During this period Pan American (using Boeing 747s), Air New Zealand (using DC-8s), UTA French Airlines (using DC-10s), Continental Airlines (using DC-10s), Hawaiian Airlines (using a DC-8), South Pacific Island Airways (using Boeing 707s), Samoa Air (using a Boeing 707), Arrow Air (using a DC-8), Air Nauru (Boeing 737 and Boeing 727), and Air Pacific (using a BAC One-Eleven) were all plying the South Pacific via Pago Pago. One could travel between Pago Pago and Honolulu for an airfare of US$99 one-way.

Jet era/post-1964 airlines
Started	Ended	Airline name	Aircraft	Route
1964	1982	Pan American Airways (defunct)	Boeing 707 & Boeing 747	Honolulu / Pago Pago / Sydney, Auckland, Papeete
1965	1978	Air New Zealand	DC-8	Auckland / Pago Pago / Honolulu
1970	1972	American Airlines	Boeing 707	Honolulu / Pago Pago / Sydney and Auckland
1975	1977	UTA French Airlines (merged with Air France)	DC-10	Noumea / Pago Pago / Papeete
1979	1983	Continental Airlines (merged with United Airlines)	DC-10	Honolulu / Pago Pago / Sydney & Auckland
1983	Current	Hawaiian Airlines	DC-8, L-1011, DC-10, Boeing 767, Airbus A330	Honolulu / Pago Pago / Papeete, Nukualofa, Auckland (no longer services these three routes from Pago Pago)
1980	1987	South Pacific Island Airways (defunct)	Boeing 707	Pago Pago / Honolulu / Papeete / Auckland / Apia (Faleolo) / Sydney / Vancouver / Anchorage / Port Moresby
1984	1985	Samoa Air (defunct)	Boeing 707	Pago Pago / Honolulu
1982	1985	Arrow Air	Boeing 707	Honolulu / Pago Pago
1978	1985	Air Nauru (downsized and renamed Our Airline)	Boeing 737 and Boeing 727	Nauru / Pago Pago
1977	1982	Air Pacific	BAC-111	Nadi / Pago Pago

==== Cargo commercial aviation ====
Towards the end of its peak commercial passenger aviation period, Pago Pago International Airport also became an ideal refueling stopover for cargo carriers due to the low cost of fuel and landing fees at the time. Cargo carriers such as Kalitta Air, Evergreen International Airlines, and Polar Air Cargo would provide at least daily Boeing 747 cargo flights to Pago Pago from the US and from Asia Pacific between 1990 and 2006.

All-cargo carriers
Started	Ended	Cargo airline name	Aircraft	Route
1990	2006	Kalitta Air	Boeing 747	Honolulu / Pago Pago / Sydney and Auckland
1994	2004	Evergreen International Airlines	Boeing 747	Honolulu / Pago Pago
1993	2002	Polar Air Cargo	Boeing 747	Honolulu / Pago Pago / Sydney / Hong Kong
2006	Current	Asia Pacific Airlines	Boeing 757	Honolulu / Pago Pago / Sydney

==== Downturn in airport usage and travel ====
The airport was a vital link to the Samoan Islands until the runway at Faleolo International Airport in Independent Samoa was improved and lengthened to handle larger than Boeing 737 type aircraft in 1984. With a population that is 3.5 times greater than American Samoa plus greater emphasis that was put on tourism growth, international airline traffic particularly from Australia, New Zealand and the South Pacific island countries began to shift from Pago Pago to Faleolo airport. Airlines with flights from the US to Australia and New Zealand also started utilizing aircraft that did not require a refueling stopover in Pago Pago. By the late 1980s and due to heavy competition and economics, only one passenger air carrier (Hawaiian Airlines) remained to serve the Pago Pago trans pacific route.

==== Runway and facility expansion ====
Runway 09/27 was the primary commercial runway for aircraft in the 1950s and early 1960s. The runway was deactivated after runway 05/23 was constructed and activated in 1964. In the mid-1970s, runway 09/27 was rehabilitated, repaved and reactivated as runway 08/26 with 3,800 feet (1,158 m) (length) by 100 feet (30 m) (width) to function as a secondary runway and taxiway. Runway 08/26 is widely used today by air taxi operators flying to Apia (Fagali'i and Faleolo), Ofu or Tau.

The Departure and Arrival terminal also went through a major expansion in the mid-1970s where buildings and space was doubled in size to handle more passengers.

To facilitate aircraft with large payload requirements and long distance flights, runway 05/23 was expanded in early 2001 from an original runway length of 9,000 feet (2,743 m) to the current 10,000 feet (3,048 m).

Jet-era post-1964 runways
Runway	Length	Width	Type	Operational years	Last major improvement	Usage	Max. aircraft type
5/23	10,000 feet (3,048 m)	150 feet (46 m)	Asphalt	1964 – current	2001	Primary runway	Boeing 747 / Lockheed C-5 Galaxy / Antonov An-225 Mriya / Airbus A380
8/26	3,800 feet (1,158 m)	100 feet (30 m)	Asphalt	1979 – current	1979	Secondary runway	Dash-8 / Dornier-328 / C-130

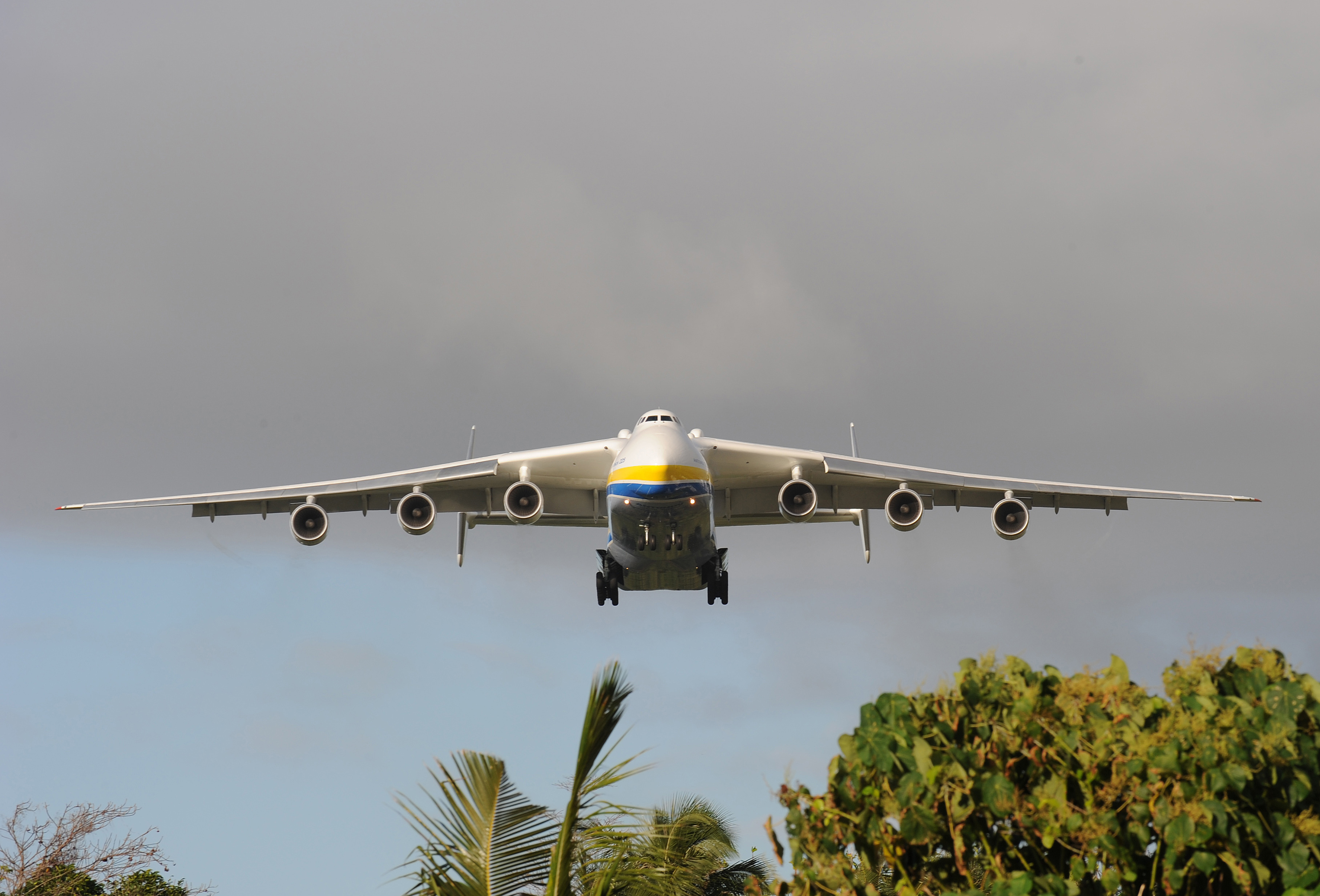
Antonov 225 on final approach to Pago Pago International Airport Runway 5/23

On October 13 and 19, 2009, the world's largest and heaviest aircraft, the Antonov An-225, landed at Pago Pago International Airport to deliver emergency power generation equipment during the 2009 Samoa earthquake and tsunami.

=== Apollo space program ===
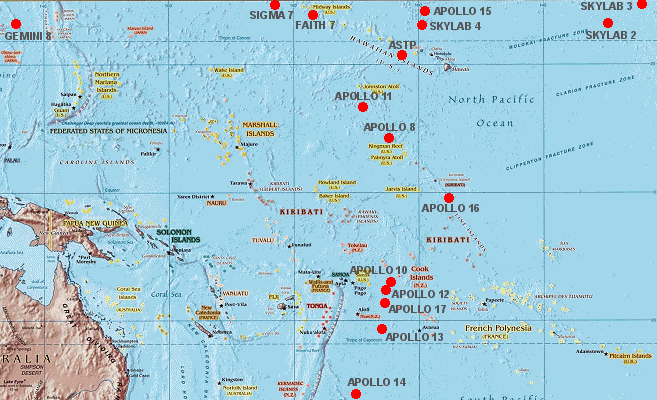
Locations of Pacific Ocean splashdowns of American spacecraft

Pago Pago International Airport had historic significance with the U.S. Apollo Program. The astronaut crews of Apollo 10, 12, 13, 14, and 17 were retrieved a few hundred miles from Pago Pago and transported by helicopter to the airport prior to being flown to Honolulu on Lockheed C-141 Starlifter military aircraft (the Apollo 10 astronauts were flown directly to Ellington Air Force Base, Texas).

In April of 1970, Apollo 13 returned to Earth, landing in the ocean near Tutuila. The astronauts were transported by helicopter to Pago Pago International Airport, where they were greeted by one of the largest crowds in American Samoan history. They were presented with Samoan gifts and entertained with traditional dances and songs before boarding their flight to Honolulu, Hawaiʻi.

== Airlines and destinations ==
Hawaiian Airlines is the only major airline serving Pago Pago International Airport. In 2004, with assistance from the American Samoan government to promote and bring additional air carriers to Pago Pago, Aloha Airlines opened a Honolulu / Pago Pago / Rarotonga route. However, the airline lasted 11 months and eventually pulled out of Pago Pago and other South Pacific routes it served due to financial issues.

In 2014, there were 2,628 flights between Pago Pago and Samoa, and 162 flights between Honolulu and Pago Pago.

A weekly cargo flight from Honolulu, Hawaii is provided by Asia Pacific Airlines.

Pago Pago International Airport is a frequent stopover for United States military aircraft flying in the South Pacific and is the only airport in the area with TACAN capabilities.

Daily inter-island flights between the Samoas are offered by Samoa Airways and Talofa Airways.

=== Passenger ===
Airlines	Destinations
Hawaiian Airlines	Honolulu
Samoa Airways	Apia–Fagali'i, Apia–Faleolo, Fitiuta, Ofu
Talofa Airways	Apia–Faleolo

=== Cargo ===
Airlines	Destinations
Asia Pacific Airlines	Honolulu

== Facilities ==
The airport covers 700 acres (283 ha) of land.

The American Samoan government is looking into legal means to overcome current US cabotage rules that forbid foreign carriers from entering and serving the Pago Pago – Honolulu or Pago Pago – Los Angeles routes.

There are regular buses that run between the airport and downtown.

The airspace above Pago Pago airport is controlled by the Christchurch, New Zealand Flight Information Region.

=== Status and expansion ===
A new aircraft rescue and firefighting (ARFF) station was completed in 2005 at a cost of US$12,000,000 (equivalent to $19,781,905 in 2025). A hot fire/crash training facility opened in 2008 at a cost of US$18,000,000 (equivalent to $26,916,538 in 2025) to train the airport's ARFF personnel and has been used by ARFF personnel from other airports in the South Pacific.

In 2010, Pago Pago International Airport underwent a US$1,000,000 (equivalent to $1,476,423 in 2025) terminal remodeling and modernization with funding from the American Recovery and Reinvestment Act of 2009. The departure terminal, immigration,Transportation Security Administration (TSA) screening and lounge areas were completely renovated and expanded to increase passenger capacity and flow.

A new control tower has been planned since 2006, but has been delayed due to arguments over funding and lack of traffic. Currently international traffic to Pago Pago is controlled from Faleolo International Airport in Samoa.

=== Terminal and gates ===
Airport terminal facilities
Area	Number	Description/comments
Passenger terminals	1	Combination of 8 buildings, interconnected
Aircraft gates	3	A, B, C
Aircraft stands	3	Ramp/tarmac area

== Accidents and incidents ==
On January 30, 1974 at about 11:41 pm Samoa local time, a Boeing 707 operating as Pan Am Flight 806 from Auckland, New Zealand, to Los Angeles, California with en route stops in Pago Pago and Honolulu, clipped trees at an elevation of 113 feet (34 m) and about 3,865 feet (1,178 m) short of the runway 05 threshold. The first impact with the ground was about 236 feet (72 m) further along the crash path. The aircraft continued through the jungle vegetation, struck a 3-foot (0.91 m)-high lava rock wall, and stopped about 3,090 feet (940 m) from the runway threshold. There were 97 fatalities out of 101 occupants on the aircraft.

== See also ==
- List of airports in American Samoa
