= Samoa Airways =

Flag carrier of Samoa

IATA	ICAO	Call sign
OL	PAO	POLYNESIAN
- Founded: 1959; 67 years ago (as Polynesian Airlines)
- Hubs: Faleolo International Airport
- Fleet size: 3
- Destinations: 5
- Parent company: Government of Samoa
- Headquarters: Apia, Samoa
- Key people: Peni (CEO)
- Website: www.samoaairways.com

Samoa Airways, formerly Polynesian Airlines, is the flag carrier of Samoa.

The airline was founded in 1959 as "Polynesian Airlines", providing domestic and international flights throughout the South Pacific. International operations were temporarily halted in 2005 and taken over by the new airline Polynesian Blue (later Virgin Samoa), before resuming international flights under the new name of "Samoa Airways" in late 2017.

Samoa Airways is wholly owned by the government of Samoa and is based in the capital city of Apia, with its headquarters located in the Samoa Methodist Church Building on Beach Road and its primary hub at Faleolo International Airport. The airline presently operates short-haul flights within Samoa and American Samoa, however it no longer serves long-haul flights to Australia and New Zealand after the company ceased jet operations in 2020 due to the COVID-19 pandemic.

== History ==
Logo for Polynesian Airlines, prior to renaming as "Samoa Airways" in 2017

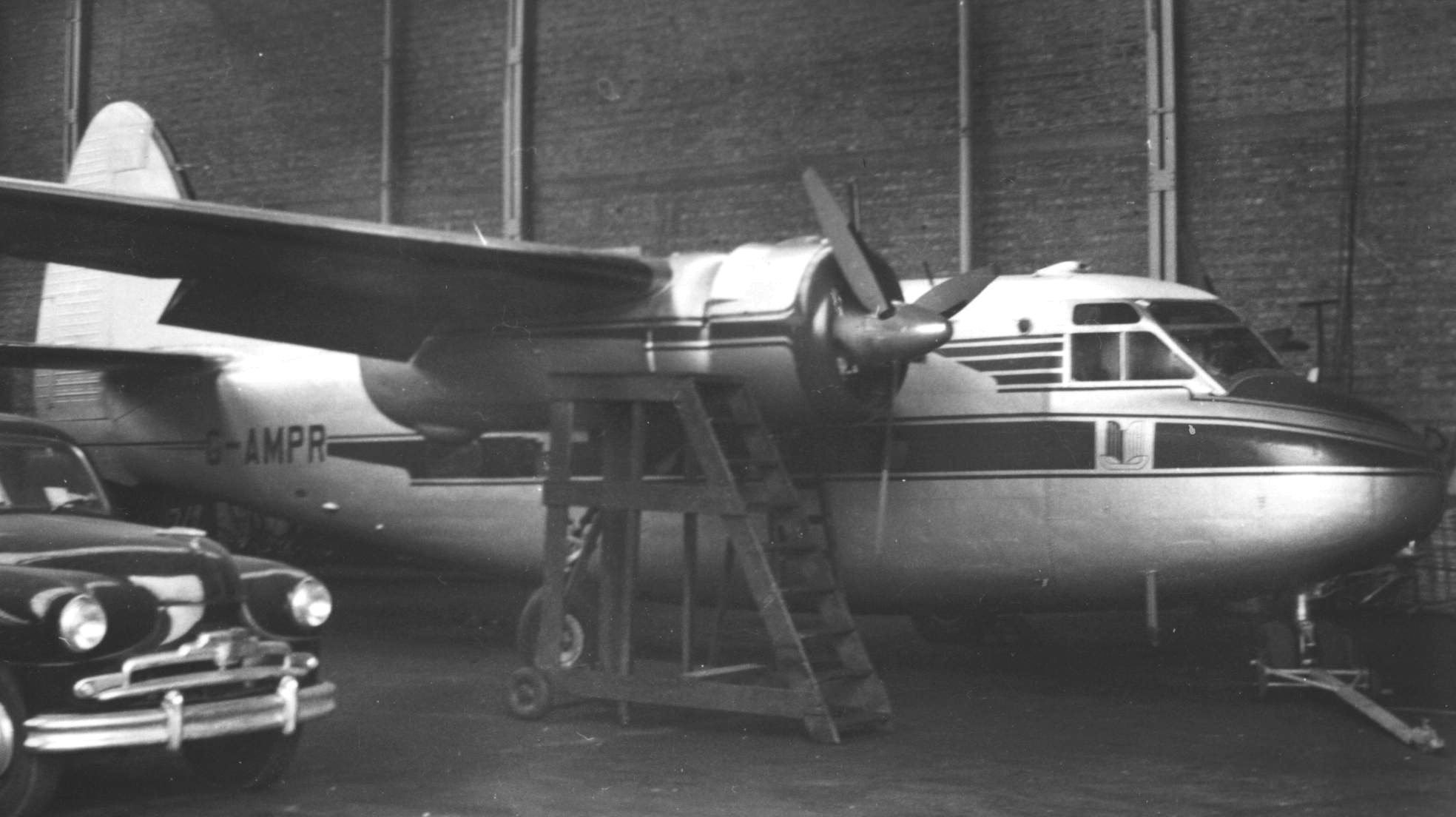
Polynesian Airlines Percival Prince

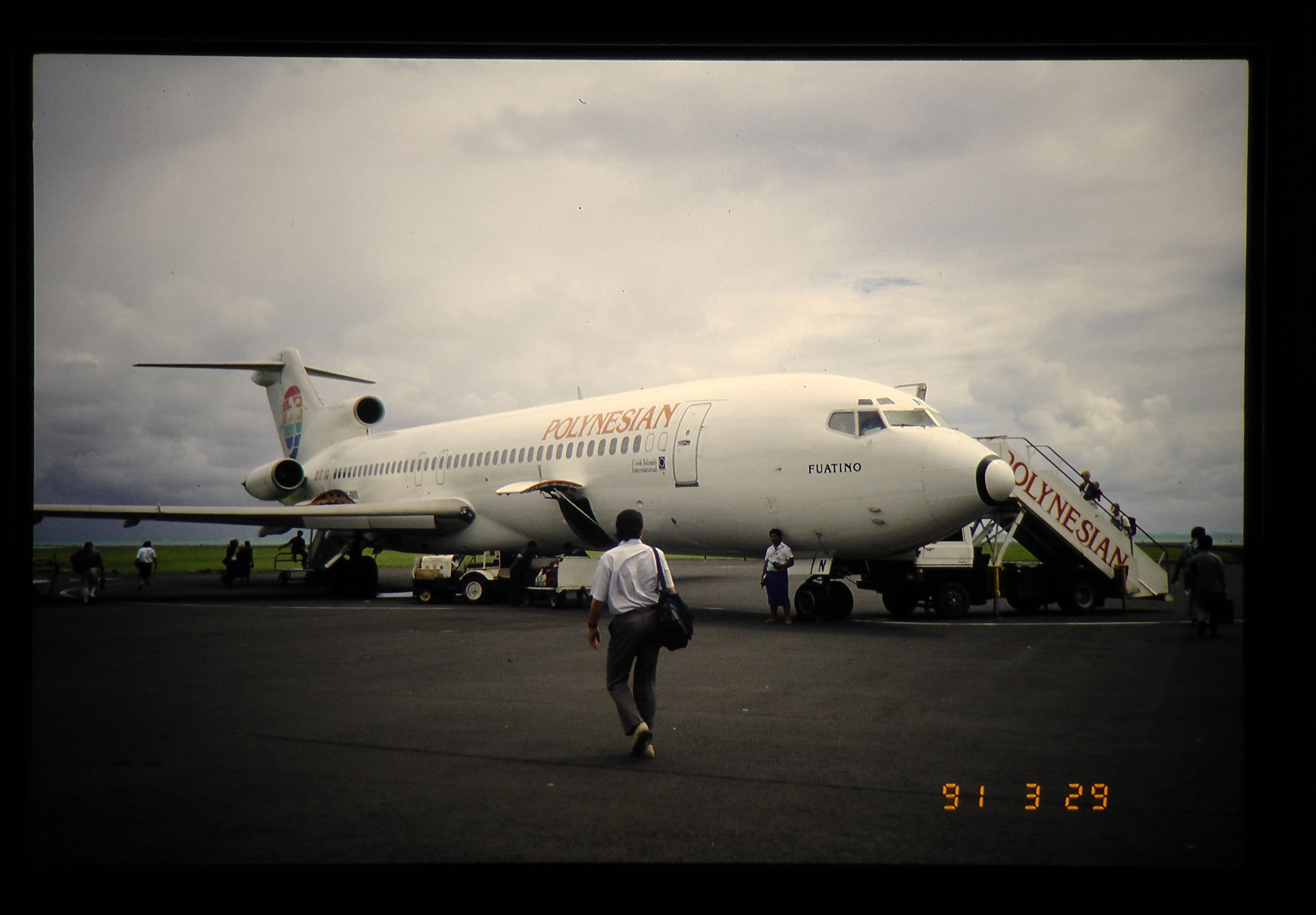
Polynesian aircraft at Fuaʻamotu International Airport in Nuku'alofa, Tonga, in 1991.

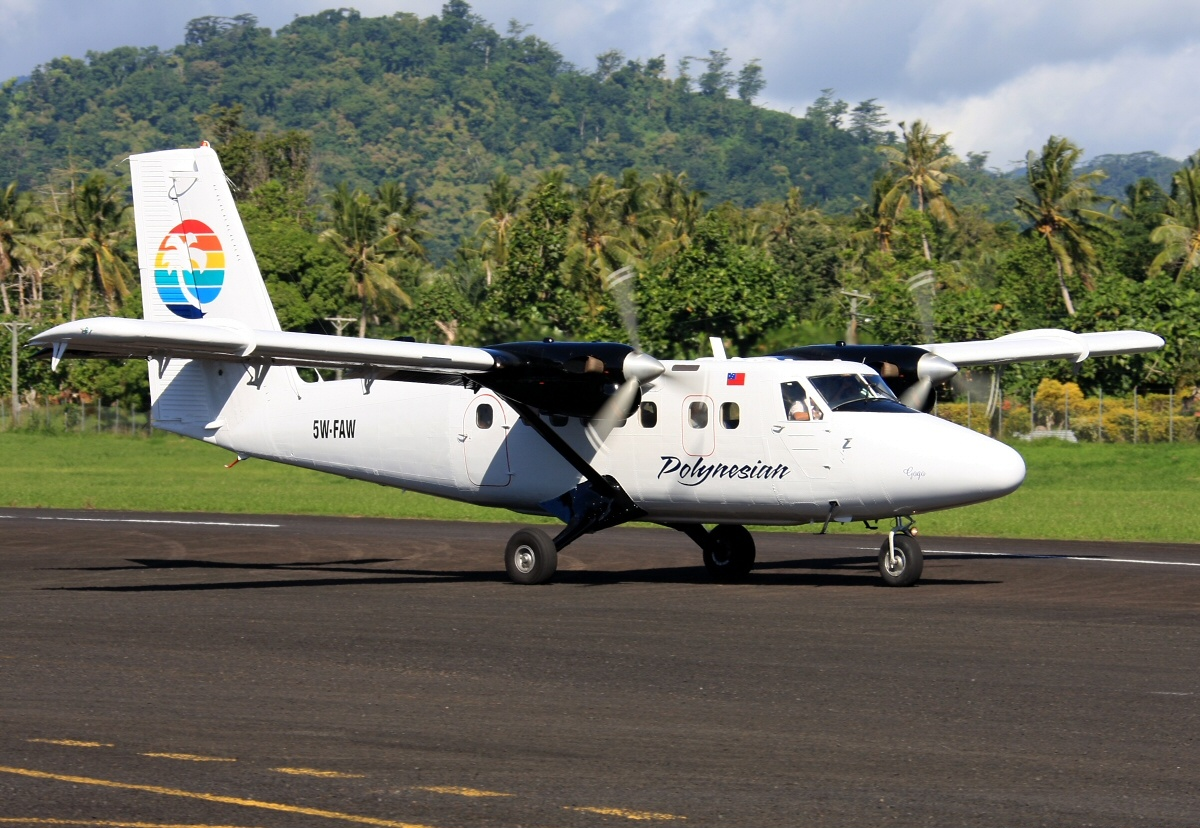
Polynesian Airlines DHC-6-300 at Fagali'i Airport in 2014.

The airline was established in 1959 as "Polynesian Airlines", and started operations in August that year. By 1969 it was running daily flights to Pago Pago using a Douglas DC-3, as well as services to Tonga and Fiji using a chartered Hawker Siddeley HS 748.

In 2005, the airline's international jet flights were taken over by Polynesian Blue, a new airline established as a joint venture between the government of Samoa and Australian low-cost carrier Virgin Blue. Both the Samoan government and Virgin Blue each held 49% ownership of the new airline with the remaining 2% held by a Samoan investment group. The government of Samoa cited rising operating costs for Polynesian Airlines, which accounted for more than half of the government's annual budget, as one of the main reasons for suspending its international operations. However, Polynesian Airlines continued to operate turboprop flights in Samoa and American Samoa. In 2011, Virgin Blue announced a rebranding of its airline group, with its Samoan subsidiary being renamed "Virgin Samoa".

In 2017, the Samoan government announced that it was closing down Virgin Samoa, citing a lack of competitive fare pricing and disappointing performance. In its place, Polynesian Airlines would resume international flights with the new name of "Samoa Airways". The state-owned Samoa Airways partnered with Fiji Airways to assist with international flight operations, and wet-leased a Boeing 737-800 from Italian airline Neos in a deal brokered by Icelandair. International flights recommenced on 14 November 2017, with Samoa Airways flying from Apia to Auckland.

== Destinations ==
As of June 2025, Samoa Airways flies (or has flown) to the following destinations (including former destinations):

Country/Territory	City	Airport	Notes	Refs
American Samoa	Fitiuta	Fitiuta Airport		
American Samoa	Ofu	Ofu Airport		
American Samoa	Pago Pago	Pago Pago International Airport		
Australia	Brisbane	Brisbane Airport	Terminated	
Australia	Melbourne	Melbourne Airport	Terminated	
Australia	Sydney	Sydney Airport	Terminated	
Cook Islands	Rarotonga	Rarotonga International Airport	Terminated	
Fiji	Nadi	Nadi International Airport	Terminated	
French Polynesia	Papeete	Fa'a'ā International Airport	Terminated	
Samoa	Apia	Fagali'i Airport		
Samoa	Apia	Faleolo International Airport	Hub	
Samoa	Savai'i	Maota Airport	Terminated	
New Zealand	Auckland	Auckland Airport	Terminated	
New Zealand	Wellington	Wellington Airport	Terminated	
Niue	Alofi	Niue International Airport	Terminated	
Tonga	Nuku'alofa	Fua'amotu International Airport	Terminated	
United States	Honolulu	Daniel K. Inouye International Airport	Terminated	
United States	Los Angeles	Los Angeles International Airport	Terminated	

=== Codeshare agreements ===
Samoa Airways has codeshare agreements with the following airlines:

- Fiji Airways

== Fleet ==
As of August 2025, Samoa Airways operates the following aircraft:

Samoa Airways fleet
Aircraft	In service	Orders	Passengers			Notes
Aircraft	In service	Orders	C	Y	Total	Notes
de Havilland Canada DHC-6-300 Twin Otter	3	—	—	19	19	
Total	3	—				

A Boeing 737 MAX 9 was ordered and was to be delivered in April 2019, however the order was cancelled in the wake of the March 2019 worldwide Boeing 737 MAX groundings.

=== Previously operated ===
As Polynesian Airlines, the airline previously operated the following aircraft:

Samoa Airways' former fleet
Aircraft	Total	Introduced	Retired	Notes
Boeing 727-200	1	1987	1992	Leased from Ansett Australia.
Boeing 737-200	1	1981	1987	
Boeing 737-300	1	1999	1999	Leased from Qantas.
Boeing 737-300	1	2001	2001	
Boeing 737-300QC	1	1993	1994	
Boeing 737-800	2	2000	2006	
Boeing 767-200ER	1	1994	1994	Leased from Kuwait Airways.
Boeing 767-300ER	1	1993	1994	Leased from Air Canada.
Britten-Norman BN-2 Islander	3	1969	2011	
De Havilland Canada Dash 8-100	1	2004	2007	
Douglas C-47 Skytrain	3	1963	1970	
Douglas C-54 Skymaster	1	1968	1969	
GAF Nomad	1	1978	1987	
Hawker Siddeley HS 748	2	1972	1982	
Percival Prince	3	1959	1963	

== Accidents and incidents ==
- On 11 May 1966 at around 18:10 local time, the three crew members operating a Polynesian Airlines Douglas DC-3 with the registration 5W-FAB on a training flight lost control of the aircraft over the Apolima Strait after the cabin entry door detached and hit the tail. The aircraft was on a training flight, the three crew members were the only people on board; all three were killed in the subsequent crash.
- On 13 January 1970 at 02:54 local time, Polynesian Airlines Flight 208B, which was operated by a Douglas DC-3D (registered 5W-FAC), crashed into the sea shortly after take-off from Faleolo International Airport on an international non-scheduled passenger flight to Pago Pago International Airport, American Samoa, killing the 29 passengers and three crew on board.
- On 20 August 1988, a Polynesian Airlines Britten-Norman BN-2A Islander (registered 5W-FAF) was damaged beyond repair when it overshot the runway upon landing at Asau Airport; there were no fatalities.
- On 13 September 1994, a Polynesian Airlines Boeing 737-3Q8 operating Flight PH844 from Fuaʻamotu International Airport to Faleolo International Airport discovered the body of a deceased male stowaway was jamming the starboard carriageway. At 6:00, after 3.5 hours of maneuvers attempting to dislodge the body, the flight made an emergency landing at Faleolo using only the nosewheel and port undercarriage. All 72 occupants survived with minimal damage to the aircraft. Eyewitness and author Ruperake Petaia wrote The Miracle based on a number of passenger accounts of the event.
- On 7 January 1997 at around 11:00 local time, a Polynesian Airlines de Havilland Canada DHC-6-300 Twin Otter crashed into Mount Vaea in Samoa during bad weather conditions, a so-called controlled flight into terrain. The aircraft had been operating Flight 211 from Pago Pago to Apia, when the pilots decided to divert to Faleolo Airport. In the crash, two of three passengers and one of the two pilots lost their lives.
