= Faleolo International Airport =

Airport near Apia, Samoa

Faleolo International Airport Malae Vaʻalele i Faleolo
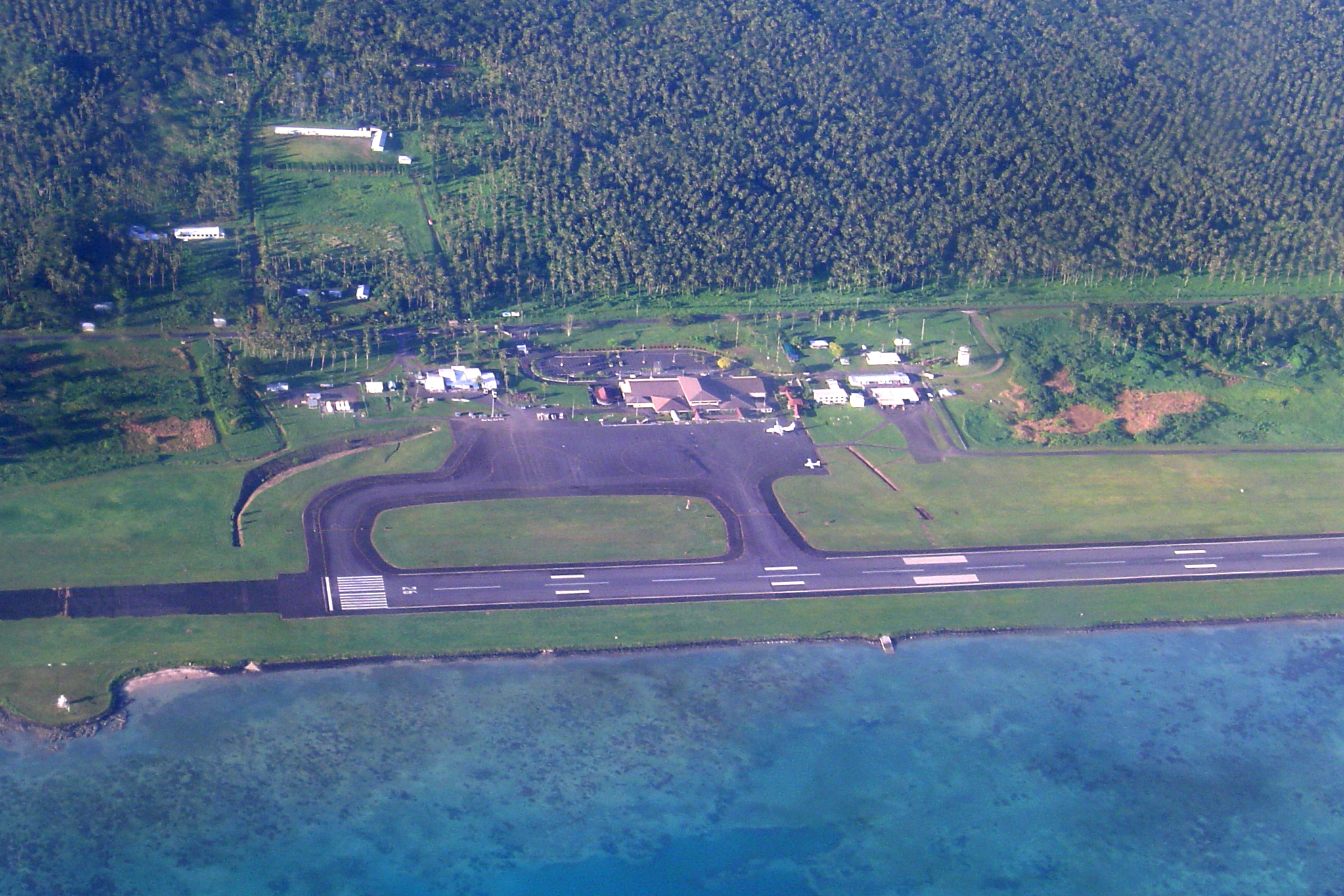
- IATA: APW; ICAO: NSFA

Summary
- Airport type: Public
- Serves: Apia, Upolu Island, Samoa
- Elevation AMSL: 58 ft (18 m)
- Coordinates: 13°49′47″S 172°00′30″W

Maps
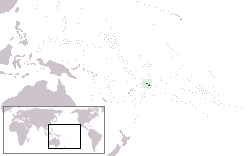
- Apia in Samoa

- Location of airport in Samoa APW /NSFA (Oceania)

Runways
Direction	Length		Surface
Direction	m	ft	Surface
08/26	3,000	9,843	Asphalt
- Source: DAFIF

Faleolo International Airport (IATA: APW, ICAO: NSFA) is an airport located 40 kilometres (25 mi) west of Apia, the capital of Samoa. Until 1984, Faleolo could not accommodate jets larger than a Boeing 737. Services to the United States, Australia, or New Zealand, could only land at Pago Pago International Airport in American Samoa. Since the airport's expansion, most international traffic now uses Faleolo.

== History ==
=== Faleolo Airfield ===
In 1942 the New Zealand colonial administration took land from the village of Satuimalufilufi for defence purposes, forcing it to relocate. United States Navy SeaBees of 1st Construction Battalion subsequently constructed an airfield and Naval Base Upolu. It became an auxiliary field of U.S. Naval Station Tutuila in the Samoa Defense Group Area during the Pacific War. Faleolo Airfield was completed by the Seabees in July 1942 and U.S. Marine Fighting Squadron VMF-111 was moved from Tafuna Airfield to Faleolo Airfield after the aircraft runway was completed to protect the islands of Upolu and Savai'i from an anticipated Japanese invasion. The original runway was 4,000 feet (1,219 m) x 200 feet (61 m) and was extended to 6,000 feet (1,829 m) x 350 feet (107 m) in March 1943 to accommodate a taxiway and space for basing of up to 57 fighter aircraft. Airfield support buildings and two hangars were also constructed and completed in March 1943.

=== Civilian airport ===
After the war the airport was used for flying boats as part of the coral route, but the airstrip itself was little-used. It was upgraded in 1957 to allow the change-over from seaplanes to land-based aircraft. Heavy rain and flooding in 1967 eroded the airstrip and forced it to be closed for three days. The Samoan government subsequently sought a loan from New Zealand and the Asian Development Bank to upgrade it to take heavier aircraft. The upgrade was completed in April 1972, giving a 5,500 feet (1,700 m) sealed runway. The extended airport was capable of handling jets up to the size of a Boeing 737, enabling direct flights to New Zealand. Desire for increased tourism saw it upgraded again over 1984-1985 to enable large jets. It was further upgraded in 2000.

=== Land claim ===
While the land was taken for defence purposes during wartime, it was not returned when the war ended, and was later transferred to the Western Samoa Trust Estates Corporation. This has been contested since Samoan independence in 1962, resulting in ongoing protests and legal action. In 1985, villagers occupied some of the land, resulting in prosecution for trespass. In 1998 villagers slaughtered government cattle and fired on police as part of a dispute over ownership. In 2012, the 50th anniversary of independence, they petitioned for its return, stopped survey work, and blocked the road to the airport. In 2018 the Samoan government forcibly relocated families to allow for a further extension to the airport to be constructed.

== Facilities ==
The airport is at an elevation of 58 feet (18 m) above mean sea level. It has one runway designated 08/26 with an asphalt surface measuring 3,000 by 45 metres (9,843 ft × 148 ft). The Pavement Classification Number for the runway is 058FBXT.

Faleolo Tower has some jurisdiction over the airspace of American Samoa and Tonga as well as its own airspace. It is assisted by the tower at Nadi, Fiji and the whole area is under Oceanic Control from Auckland, New Zealand.

== Airlines and destinations ==
Airlines	Destinations
Air New Zealand	Auckland
Fiji Airways	Honolulu, Nadi
Qantas	Auckland, Brisbane, Sydney–Kingsford Smith
Samoa Airways	Pago Pago, Savai'i
Talofa Airways	Pago Pago

== Accidents and incidents ==
- On 11 December 1950 a Royal New Zealand Air Force Consolidated PBY Catalina crashed shortly after takeoff from the lagoon, killing seven people. One crew member and five passengers survived the crash.
- On 13 January 1970, Polynesian Airlines Flight 208B, operated by Douglas C-47B 5W-FAC crashed into the sea shortly after take-off on an international non-scheduled passenger flight to Pago Pago International Airport, American Samoa. All 32 people on board were killed.
- On 14 September 1994, a Polynesian Airlines Boeing 737-300 operating Flight PH844 from Fuaʻamotu International Airport in Tonga could not extend its undercarriage because of the body of a male stowaway which was jammed in the wheel well. The flight made an emergency landing at Faleolo using only the nosewheel and port undercarriage with minimal damage to the aircraft. Eye witness and author Ruperake Petaia wrote The Miracle (1996, 2013) based on a number of passenger accounts of the event.
- In 2000, Air New Zealand flight NZ60 nearly overshot the runway due to a faulty instrument landing system, which had been accidentally damaged by a digger. The pilots took a number of measures to successfully prevent an accident, which were incorporated into a training video. Key points from the video that averted disaster included the pilots' unease about the ILS glideslope capture, the conflict between the aircraft's altitude and the functioning Distance Measuring Equipment, and their familiarity with the approach into Faleolo which caused them to realise they were not where they were supposed to be, had the ILS been functioning correctly. For these reasons they initiated a go around, and used the VOR/DME equipment for the second and successful approach.

== See also ==
- List of airports in Samoa
