= Index of Marshall Islands–related articles =

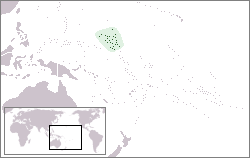
The location of the Marshall Islands

The following is an alphabetical list of topics related to the Marshall Islands.

== 0–9 ==
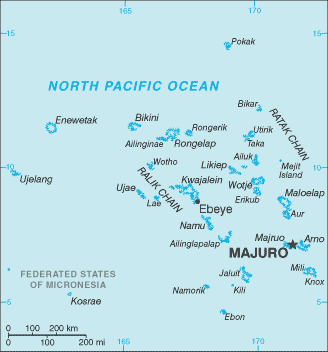
A map of the Marshall Islands

- .mh – Internet country code top-level domain for the Marshall Islands

== A ==
- Ailinginae Atoll
- Ailinglaplap Atoll
- Ailuk Atoll
- Airports in the Marshall Islands
- Arno Atoll
- Atlas of the Marshall Islands
- Attongtonganebwokwbwokw
- Aur Atoll

== B ==
- Bikar Atoll
- Bikini Atoll
- Birds of the Marshall Islands
- Bokak Atoll
- Bucholz Army Airfield

== C ==
- Capital of the Marshall Islands: Majuro
- Categories:
  - Category:Marshall Islands
    - Category:Buildings and structures in the Marshall Islands
    - Category:Communications in the Marshall Islands
    - Category:Culture of the Marshall Islands
    - Category:Economy of the Marshall Islands
    - Category:Education in the Marshall Islands
    - Category:Environment of the Marshall Islands
    - Category:Geography of the Marshall Islands
    - Category:Government of the Marshall Islands
    - Category:History of the Marshall Islands
    - Category:Marshall Islands-related lists
    - Category:Marshallese people
    - Category:Politics of the Marshall Islands
    - Category:Society of the Marshall Islands
    - Category:Sports in the Marshall Islands
    - Category:Transportation in the Marshall Islands
  - commons:Category:Marshall Islands
- Cities in the Marshall Islands
- Climate of the Marshall Islands
- Coat of arms of the Marshall Islands
- Communications in the Marshall Islands
- Compact of Free Association with the United States of America
- Culture of the Marshall Islands

== D ==
- Demographics of the Marshall Islands
- Diplomatic missions in the Marshall Islands
- Diplomatic missions of the Marshall Islands

== E ==
- Eastern Hemisphere
- Ebon Atoll
- Economy of the Marshall Islands
- Education in the Marshall Islands
- Elections in the Marshall Islands
- Enewetak Atoll
- English language
- Erikub Atoll

== F ==
The Flag of the Marshall Islands

- Flag of the Marshall Islands
- Foreign relations of the Marshall Islands

== G ==
- Geography of the Marshall Islands
- Government of the Marshall Islands
- Gross domestic product
- Gugeegue

== H ==
- Health care in the Marshall Islands
- History of the Marshall Islands

== I ==
- International Organization for Standardization (ISO)
  - ISO 3166-1 alpha-2 country code for Marshall Islands: MH
  - ISO 3166-1 alpha-3 country code for Marshall Islands: MHL
  - ISO 3166-2:MH region codes for Marshall Islands
- Internet in the Marshall Islands
- Island countries
- Islands of the Republic of the Marshall Islands:
  - Ailinginae Atoll
  - Ailinglaplap Atoll
  - Ailuk Atoll
  - Arno Atoll
  - Aur Atoll
  - Bikar Atoll
  - Bikini Atoll
  - Bokak Atoll
  - Ebon Atoll
  - Enen-kio Atoll
  - Enewetak Atoll
  - Erikub Atoll
  - Jabat Island
  - Jaluit Atoll
  - Jemo Island
  - Kili Island
  - Knox Atoll
  - Kwajalein
  - Lae Atoll
  - Lib Island
  - Likiep Atoll
  - Majuro Atoll
  - Maloelap Atoll
  - Mejit Island
  - Mili Atoll
  - Namdrik Atoll
  - Namu Atoll
  - Rongelap Atoll
  - Rongerik Atoll
  - Toke Atoll
  - Ujae Atoll
  - Ujelang Atoll
  - Utirik Atoll
  - Wotho Atoll
  - Wotje Atoll

== J ==
- Jabat Island
- Jaluit Atoll
- Jemo Island

== K ==
- Kili Island
- Knox Atoll
- Kwajalein

== L ==
- Lae Atoll
- Law enforcement in the Marshall Islands
- Legislature of the Marshall Islands
- Lib Island
- Likiep Atoll
- Lists:
  - Diplomatic missions of the Marshall Islands
  - List of islands of the Marshall Islands
  - List of airports in the Marshall Islands
  - List of archipelagos
  - List of birds of the Marshall Islands
  - List of cities in the Marshall Islands
  - List of countries by GDP (nominal)
  - List of diplomatic missions in the Marshall Islands
  - List of island countries
    - List of island countries by area
    - List of island countries by population density
  - List of Marshall Islands-related topics
  - List of political parties in the Marshall Islands

== M ==
- Majuro, capital
- Majuro Atoll
- Maloelap Atoll
- Marshall Islands
- Marshall Islands International Airport
- Marshallese language
- MH – ISO 3166-1 alpha-2 and USPS country code for the Republic of the Marshall Islands
- MHL – ISO 3166-1 alpha-3 country code for the Republic of the Marshall Islands
- Mejit Island
- Micronesia
- Micronesia challenge
- Mili Atoll
- Military of the Marshall Islands
- Music of the Marshall Islands

== N ==
- Namdrik Atoll
- Namu Atoll
- Nitijela, national legislature
- North Pacific Ocean
- Northern Hemisphere

== O ==
- Oceania
- Outline of the Marshall Islands

== P ==
- Pacific Ocean
- Political parties in the Marshall Islands
- Politics of the Marshall Islands
- President of the Marshall Islands

== R ==
- Rälik Chain
- Ratak Chain
- Religion in the Marshall Islands
- Republic of the Marshall Islands
- Rongelap Atoll
- Rongerik Atoll

== S ==
- Scouting in the Marshall Islands
- Small Island Developing States

== T ==
- Toke Atoll
- Topic outline of the Marshall Islands
- Transportation in the Marshall Islands
- Tropical cyclones in the Marshall Islands

== U ==
- Ujae Atoll
- Ujelang Atoll
- Utirik Atoll

== W ==
- Wake Island
- Wikimedia Atlas of the Marshall Islands
- Wikipedia:WikiProject Topic outline/Drafts/Topic outline of the Marshall Islands
- Wōdejebato
- Wotho Atoll
- Wotje Atoll

== See also ==
- List of international rankings
- Lists of country-related topics
- Topic outline of geography
- Topic outline of the Marshall Islands
