= Outline of the Marshall Islands =

Overview of and topical guide to the Marshall Islands

The Flag of the Marshall Islands

The Seal of the Marshall Islands

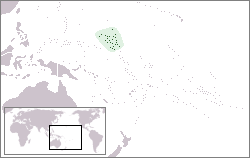
The location of the Marshall Islands

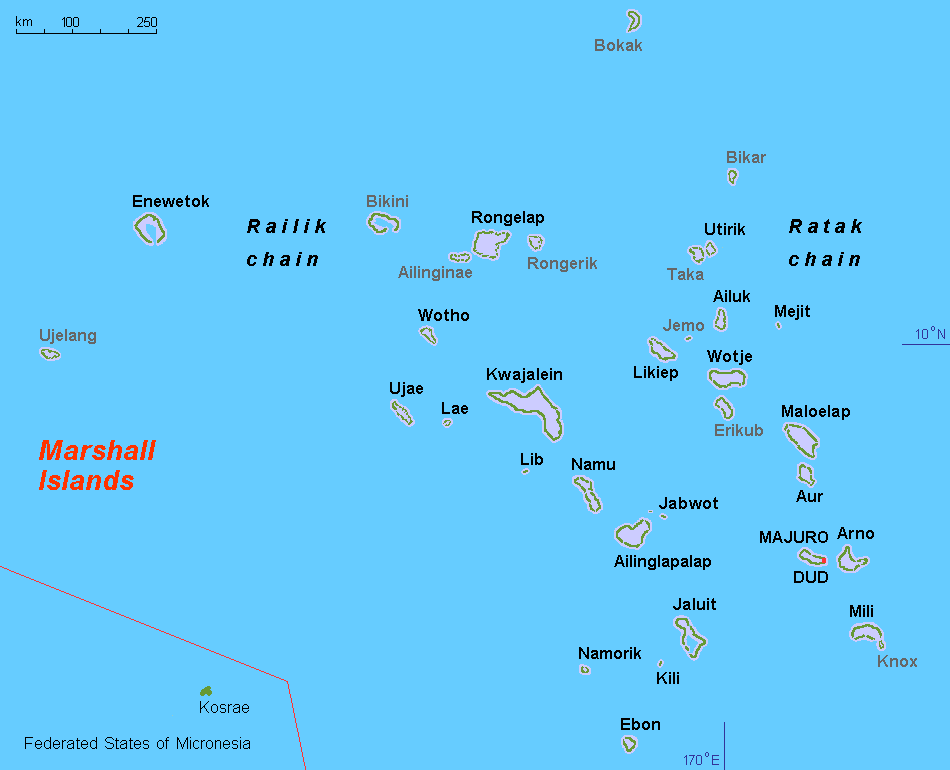
An enlargeable map of the Republic of the Marshall Islands

The following outline is provided as an overview of and topical guide to the Marshall Islands:

Marshall Islands – sovereign Micronesian island nation located in the western North Pacific Ocean, north of Nauru and Kiribati, east of the Federated States of Micronesia, and south of the U.S. territory of Wake Island, to which it lays claim.

== General reference ==
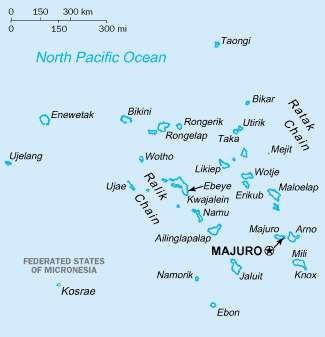
An enlargeable basic map of the Marshall Islands

- Pronunciation:
- Common English country name: The Marshall Islands
- Official English country name: The Republic of the Marshall Islands
- Common endonym(s):
- Official endonym(s):
- Adjectival(s): Marshallese
- Demonym(s):
- Etymology: Name of the Marshall Islands
- ISO country codes: MH, MHL, 584
- ISO region codes: See ISO 3166-2:MH
- Internet country code top-level domain: .mh

== Geography of the Marshall Islands ==
Geography of the Marshall Islands

- The Marshall Islands are: an island country
- Location:
  - Northern Hemisphere and Eastern Hemisphere
  - Pacific Ocean
    - North Pacific Ocean
      - Oceania
        - Micronesia
  - Time zone: UTC+12
  - Extreme points of the Marshall Islands
    - High: unnamed location on Likiep 10 m (33 ft)
    - Low: North Pacific Ocean 0 m
  - Land boundaries: none
  - Coastline: North Pacific Ocean 370.4 km
- Population of the Marshall Islands:
- Area of the Marshall Islands:
- Atlas of the Marshall Islands

=== Environment of the Marshall Islands ===
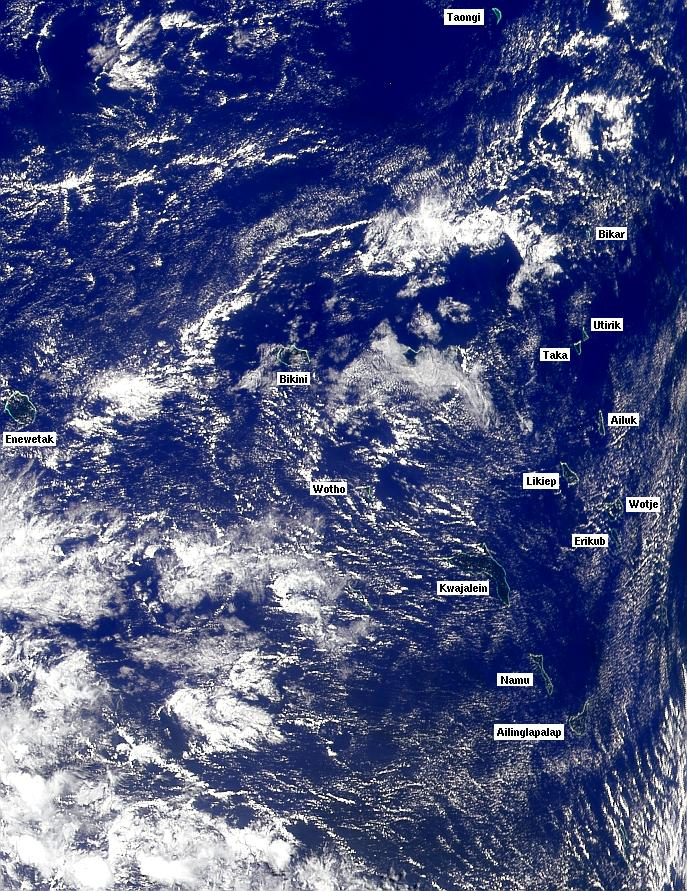
An enlargeable satellite image of Marshall Islands

- Climate of the Marshall Islands
- Renewable energy in the Marshall Islands
- Geology of the Marshall Islands
- Protected areas of the Marshall Islands
  - Biosphere reserves in the Marshall Islands
  - National parks of the Marshall Islands
- Wildlife of the Marshall Islands
  - Fauna of the Marshall Islands
    - Birds of the Marshall Islands
    - Mammals of the Marshall Islands

==== Natural geographic features of the Marshall Islands ====
- Fjords of the Marshall Islands: None
- Glaciers of the Marshall Islands: None
- Islands of the Marshall Islands
- Lakes of the Marshall Islands
- Mountains of the Marshall Islands
  - Volcanoes in the Marshall Islands
- Rivers of the Marshall Islands
  - Waterfalls of the Marshall Islands
- Valleys of the Marshall Islands
- World Heritage Sites in the Marshall Islands: None

=== Regions of the Marshall Islands ===
Regions of the Marshall Islands

==== Ecoregions of the Marshall Islands ====
List of ecoregions in the Marshall Islands

- Ecoregions in the Marshall Islands

==== Administrative divisions of the Marshall Islands ====
None

===== Municipalities of the Marshall Islands =====
- Capital of the Marshall Islands: Majuro
- Cities of the Marshall Islands

=== Demography of the Marshall Islands ===
Demographics of the Marshall Islands

== Government and politics of the Marshall Islands ==
Politics of the Marshall Islands Form of government:

- Capital of the Marshall Islands: Majuro
- Elections in the Marshall Islands
  - Political parties in the Marshall Islands

=== Branches of the government of the Marshall Islands ===
Government of the Marshall Islands

==== Executive branch of the government of the Marshall Islands ====
- Head of state: President of the Marshall Islands,
- Head of government: Prime Minister of the Marshall Islands,
- Cabinet of the Marshall Islands

===== Foreign relations of the Marshall Islands =====
Foreign relations of the Marshall Islands

- Diplomatic missions in the Marshall Islands
- Diplomatic missions of the Marshall Islands
- United States-the Marshall Islands relations

==== Legislative branch of the government of the Marshall Islands ====
- Parliament of the Marshall Islands (bicameral)
  - Upper house: Senate of the Marshall Islands
  - Lower house: House of Commons of the Marshall Islands

==== Judicial branch of the government of the Marshall Islands ====
Court system of the Marshall Islands

- Supreme Court of the Marshall Islands
- High Court of the Marshall Islands

==== International organization membership ====
The Republic of the Marshall Islands is a member of:

- African, Caribbean, and Pacific Group of States (ACP)
- Asian Development Bank (ADB)
- Food and Agriculture Organization (FAO)
- Group of 77 (G77)
- International Atomic Energy Agency (IAEA)
- International Bank for Reconstruction and Development (IBRD)
- International Civil Aviation Organization (ICAO)
- International Criminal Court (ICCt)
- International Criminal Police Organization (Interpol)
- International Development Association (IDA)
- International Finance Corporation (IFC)
- International Labour Organization (ILO)
- International Maritime Organization (IMO)
- International Mobile Satellite Organization (IMSO)
- International Monetary Fund (IMF)
- International Olympic Committee (IOC)
- International Telecommunication Union (ITU)
- Organisation for the Prohibition of Chemical Weapons (OPCW)
- Pacific Islands Forum (PIF)
- Secretariat of the Pacific Community (SPC)
- South Pacific Regional Trade and Economic Cooperation Agreement (Sparteca)
- United Nations (UN)
- United Nations Conference on Trade and Development (UNCTAD)
- United Nations Educational, Scientific, and Cultural Organization (UNESCO)
- World Health Organization (WHO)

=== Law and order in the Marshall Islands ===
Law of the Marshall Islands

- Constitution of the Marshall Islands
- Crime in the Marshall Islands
- Human rights in the Marshall Islands
  - LGBT rights in the Marshall Islands
  - Freedom of religion in the Marshall Islands
- Law enforcement in the Marshall Islands

=== Military of the Marshall Islands ===
Military of the Marshall Islands

- Command
  - Commander-in-chief:
    - Ministry of Defence of the Marshall Islands
- Forces
  - Army of the Marshall Islands
  - Navy of the Marshall Islands
  - Air Force of the Marshall Islands
  - Special forces of the Marshall Islands
- Military history of the Marshall Islands
- Military ranks of the Marshall Islands

=== Local government in the Marshall Islands ===
Local government in the Marshall Islands

== History of the Marshall Islands ==
- Military history of the Marshall Islands

== Culture of the Marshall Islands ==
Culture of the Marshall Islands

- Architecture of the Marshall Islands
- Cuisine of the Marshall Islands
- Festivals in the Marshall Islands
- Languages of the Marshall Islands
- Media in the Marshall Islands
- National symbols of the Marshall Islands
  - Coat of arms of the Marshall Islands
  - Flag of the Marshall Islands
  - National anthem of the Marshall Islands
- People of the Marshall Islands
- Public holidays in the Marshall Islands
- Records of the Marshall Islands
- Religion in the Marshall Islands
  - Christianity in the Marshall Islands
  - Hinduism in the Marshall Islands
  - Islam in the Marshall Islands
  - Judaism in the Marshall Islands
  - Sikhism in the Marshall Islands
- World Heritage Sites in the Marshall Islands: None

=== Art in the Marshall Islands ===
- Art in the Marshall Islands
- Cinema of the Marshall Islands
- Literature of the Marshall Islands
- Music of the Marshall Islands
- Television in the Marshall Islands
- Theatre in the Marshall Islands

=== Sports in the Marshall Islands ===
Sports in the Marshall Islands

- Football in the Marshall Islands

== Economy and infrastructure of the Marshall Islands ==
Economy of the Marshall Islands

- Economic rank, by nominal GDP (2007): 187th (one hundred and eighty seventh)
- Agriculture in the Marshall Islands
- Banking in the Marshall Islands
  - National Bank of the Marshall Islands
- Communications in the Marshall Islands
  - Internet in the Marshall Islands
- Companies of the Marshall Islands
- Currency of the Marshall Islands: Dollar
  - ISO 4217: USD
- Energy in the Marshall Islands
  - Energy policy of the Marshall Islands
  - Oil industry in the Marshall Islands
- Mining in the Marshall Islands
- Tourism in the Marshall Islands
- Transport in the Marshall Islands
- the Marshall Islands Stock Exchange

== Education in the Marshall Islands ==
Education in the Marshall Islands

== Infrastructure of the Marshall Islands ==
- Health care in the Marshall Islands
- Transportation in the Marshall Islands
  - Airports in the Marshall Islands
  - Rail transport in the Marshall Islands
  - Roads in the Marshall Islands
- Water supply and sanitation in the Marshall Islands

== See also ==
- Marshall Islands
- Index of Marshall Islands–related articles
- List of international rankings
- Member state of the United Nations
- Outline of geography
- Outline of Oceania
