= Church of Peace =

Church of Peace, German: Friedenskirche, may refer to church institutions and building which carry Peace (Friede) in their names, including:

- Basilica of Our Lady of Peace, Ivory Coast
- Cathedral Basilica of Our Lady of Peace, Hawaii, U.S.
- Church of Heavenly Peace, Fuzhou, China
- Church of Our Lady of Peace, New York, N.Y., U.S.
- Church of Queen of Peace, Kričke, Croatia
- Church of Peace (Sanssouci) in Potsdam, Germany
- Churches of Peace, Silesia
- Churches of Peace in Jawor and Świdnica, Poland
- King of Peace Episcopal Church (Kingsland, Georgia), U.S.
- Maria, Königin des Friedens in Neviges, Germany
- Mary Queen of Peace Catholic Church Pottsville, Pennsylvania, U.S.
- Our Lady Queen of Peace Church, Richmond, U.S.
- Our Lady of Peace Church (Stratford, Connecticut), U.S.
- Our Lady of Peace Shrine, California, U.S.
- Peace Baptist Church, Birmingham, Alabama, U.S.
- Peace Church in Pennsylvania, U.S.
- Peace Church Bangladesh
- Peace churches
- Peace Lutheran Church (Friedenberg, Missouri), U.S.
- Prince of Peace Lutheran Church, Woodridge, Ill. U.S.
- Queen of Peace Church, Ebeye

== See also ==
- Peace churches
- Our Lady of Peace
- Our Lady of Peace (disambiguation)
