= Baháʼí Faith in the Marshall Islands =

The Baháʼí Faith in the Marshall Islands begins after 1916 with a mention by ʻAbdu'l-Bahá, then head of the religion, that Baháʼís should take the religion there. The first Baháʼí to pioneer there arrived in August 1954 however she could only stay until March 1955. Nevertheless, with successive pioneers and converts the first Baháʼí Local Spiritual Assembly in 1967 in Majuro. The community continued to grow and in 1977 elected its first National Spiritual Assembly. Before 1992 the Baháʼís began to operate state schools under contract with the government. Middle estimates of the Baháʼí population are just over 1,000, or 1.50% in 2000.

== Early days ==
=== ʻAbdu'l-Bahá's Tablets of the Divine Plan ===
ʻAbdu'l-Bahá, head of the Bahá’í Faith from 1892 to 1921, mentioned the Marshall Islands among the places Baháʼís should take the religion to. He wrote a series of letters, or Tablets, to the followers of the religion in the United States in 1916–1917; these letters were compiled together in the book titled Tablets of the Divine Plan. The seventh of the Tablets mentioned taking the Baháʼí Faith to the Marshall Islands and was written on 11 April 1916, but was delayed in being presented in the United States until 1919 — after the end of World War I and the Spanish flu. These Tablets were translated into English, and published in Star of the West magazine on 12 December 1919.

(Tablet 7) "A party speaking their languages, severed, holy, sanctified and filled with the love of God, must turn their faces to and travel through the three great island groups of the Pacific Ocean — Polynesia, Micronesia and Melanesia, and the islands attached to these groups, such as New Guinea, Borneo, Java, Sumatra, Philippine Islands, Solomon Islands, Fiji Islands, New Hebrides, Loyalty Islands, New Caledonia, Bismarck Archipelago, Ceram, Celebes, Friendly Islands, Samoa Islands, Society Islands, Caroline Islands, Low Archipelago, Marquesas, Hawaiian Islands, Gilbert Islands, Moluccas, Marshall Islands, Timor and the other islands. With hearts overflowing with the love of God, with tongues commemorating the mention of God, with eyes turned to the Kingdom of God, they must deliver the glad tidings of the manifestation of the Lord of Hosts to all the people. Know ye of a certainty that whatever gathering ye enter, the waves of the Holy Spirit are surging over it, and the heavenly grace of the Blessed Beauty encompasseth that gathering."

=== Beginnings ===
Marcia Steward (later de Matamores Atwater), was a pioneer and named a Knight of Baháʼu'lláh for being the first to move to the Marshall Islands. Steward was born in Pasadena, California in 1904, and embraced the Bahá’í Faith in 1938 and was eager to pioneer before the conclusion of the first Seven Year Plan (1937–1944) of Shoghi Effendi, who the appointed successor of ʻAbdu'l-Bahá. Marcia Steward first settled in Santiago de Chile. She continued to serve across Latin America for a number of years as plans proceeded for the religion. See Baháʼí Faith in Chile, Baháʼí Faith in Costa Rica. By July 1947 Atwater was appointed secretary of the Central American Teaching Committee with one of its goals to facilitate a shift in the balance of roles from North American guidance and Latin cooperation to Latin guidance and North American cooperation. The process was well underway by 1950 and was to be enforced about 1953. While she was deciding where to serve next a cable from Shoghi Effendi arrived asking Atwater to try to get to the Marshall Islands sometime between 1 April and 2 May 1954. His cable reached Atwater on 16 April and by 20 April she was in Washington DC. Immediately after World War II the islands were administered for about 6 years by the United States Navy. When the Trusteeships under the United Nations were formed, the Marshall Islands became part of the Trusteeship of the Pacific (which included the Caroline, and Mariana Islands as well as the Marshall Islands). The United States was given the authority to administer this Trusteeship by the United Nations. The Marshall Islands were the site of nuclear bomb tests, the Marshall Islands were tightly closed to any guests unconnected with government work. At the time she had a contract with a publisher and hoped to be self-sufficient after finishing her book. By 9 May she informed the then Secretary of the National Spiritual Assembly of the United States, Horace Holley that she had permission to enter the islands and was awaiting her Navy security clearance. Atwater was able to secure a visa to travel there because of excellent connections in Washington D.C., and got her original three-month pass renewed because of the same contacts. Maintaining the appearance of wealth and ease which accompanied her family's position in the U.S., she was actually, by the time she went to the Marshalls, completely without independent income, and was deputized by the United States National Spiritual Assembly with some help from the National Spiritual Assembly of Central America. In July 1954 she left Hawaii, finally, for Japan, and then sailed from Kobe to the Marshall Islands, arriving in Majuro, capital and largest city of the Republic of the Marshall Islands, on August 7.

While there she was invited to a reception in honor of a visiting U.S. congressman from Colorado where she recited, upon request, some of her "poetry of Majuro," after which the congressman asked for copies. Marcia wrote to Virginia Breaks in the Caroline Islands that most of her good friends in the Marshalls were Catholic or Jesuit priests, remarking, "this is probably natural, since I lived in a Latin-American Catholic environment for so many years." Breaks said that Atwater seemed to "greatly enjoy" her time on the islands, and "she was apparently given government housing." Marcia hoped to stay on in the islands although she was very ill during her last two months there, but she was not given another permit. She was able to stay until March 1955. During that time she taught the religion, traveled to various atolls, fulfilled some press commitments which were subject to the District Commissioner's censor but which had, in the end, been helpful in securing her visa; and she tried to get some Baháʼí information translated into Marshallese. The nature of her illness is unknown, as is the story of all her activities there, since the report she wrote was lost and she evidently never had the strength to re-write it. After leaving the islands she suffered from a debilitating skin ailment, of which she wrote, "A terrible affliction has me almost ready to be locked up: I am quite horrible to behold...." She felt her skin problem was caused by radiation burns from atomic testing on the Marshalls, but this could never be proved, and she tried unsuccessfully to collect compensation from the U.S. government.

The Marshall Islands, vacated for several months when it became necessary for Atwater to leave, was replaced by another Baháʼí pioneer, Betty Klaas, from Honolulu by August 1956. By 1960 there were no pioneer Baháʼís but by 1964 there is mention of a group of Baháʼís there. The first Local Spiritual Assembly of the Baháʼís of Majuro was elected 21 April 1967. This is also the first Local Spiritual Assembly to be formed in the Trust Territory of Micronesia. Its members were Jack Peter, Elsie Heran, Ninam Reran, Brad Hollinger (pioneer), Kim Lang (pioneer), Tataka Arawatau, Betra Heran, Harlan Lang (pioneer) and Pencil Heran. In 1972 a regional spiritual assembly of the North West Pacific Ocean was based in Pohnpei covering the Caroline, Marshall and Mariana Islands.

A second local assembly was elected in "Laura" in 1975. In 1976 the first spiritual assembly on Santo Island, in the Kwajalein Atoll, was announced January 1. All the teachers involved in the formation of this assembly were Micronesians. The activity evolved under the direction of the national teaching committee of the Marshall Islands, with the help of the Spiritual Assembly of Ebeye Island of the same atoll.

== Growth across the nation ==
Following international conferences on the promulgation of the religion in Hong Kong, 26–30 November 1975 and Auckland, New Zealand, 19–22 January 1976 a Marshallese conference was held later in January. In March 1977 four Baháʼí communities gathered and had a picnic to discuss the upcoming first National Convention and the importance of Local Spiritual Assembly elections. Thirty-five Baháʼís and their children were present.

Baháʼí communities of the Marshall Islands by the mid-1980s

Hand of the Cause Collis Featherstone represented the Universal House of Justice as witness to the convention and election in April when the National Spiritual Assembly of the Marshall Islands was elected. Among the national assembly's first goals assigned by the Universal House of Justice was a goal to "Open the remaining major islands of the Marshalls to the Faith and greatly increase the number of believers." By the end of 1977 two new assemblies are in Ajeltake and Arno Arno Lukej which were elected bringing the total in the Marshall Islands to nine.

In February 1979 the National Spiritual Assembly of the Marshall Islands reports "The major islands that are uninhabited: Toka, Ailinginae, Rongdrik, Jemo, Bikini, Erkub, Bokak, Bikar." In the same report, Rongelap Atoll is listed as having a Baháʼí group, Ujelang Atoll is shown as an isolated Baháʼí and Enewetak Atoll as well is shown to have a group. In March the Department of Secretariat at the Baháʼí World Centre writes to the national assembly saying, "It is noted that there are only two major inhabited islands not yet open to the Faith -- Mejit and Ailuk, and it is hoped these will soon be opened." By the summer of 1979 there were 15 more local assemblies, 42 localities, a temple site, endowment land, three local centers, and two revised translations of a prayer book.

In August 1983 the national assembly report states "Atolls which have no population and therefore are not to be considered under any teaching plan are as follows: Ailingae, Bikar, Bikini, Bokaak (Taongi), Erikub, Jemo, Knox, Rongerik, and Taja." A note is appended by the national assembly to this same report reads: "Note: Though one of the larger islands of the M.I. atolls, Rongelap is largely radioactive, with no population." A second note, in reference to Ujelang Atoll, reads: "Note: For a time uninhabited, there is a report some people may have returned." A former Peace Corps member who had worked on Lae Atoll in 1969-71 as an elementary school teacher returned in 1984 as a Baháʼí and managed to introduce the religion on a few atolls where no natives had yet joined the religion. She stayed in the Marshall Islands as a pioneer until 2000.

=== Multiplying interests accelerate ===
Since its inception the religion has had involvement in socio-economic development beginning by giving greater freedom to women, promulgating the promotion of female education as a priority concern, and that involvement was given practical expression by creating schools, agricultural coops, and clinics. The religion entered a new phase of activity when a message of the Universal House of Justice dated 20 October 1983 was released. Baháʼís were urged to seek out ways, compatible with the Baháʼí teachings, in which they could become involved in the social and economic development of the communities in which they lived. Worldwide in 1979 there were 129 officially recognized Baháʼí socio-economic development projects. By 1987, the number of officially recognized development projects had increased to 1482. In the Marshall Islands a management team composed of Baháʼís as requested by the national government, operated 7 public elementary schools under contract with the government. Following the growth of the institutions the organizational impact of the Baháʼís became more well known starting in the mid-1980s in the Marshall Islands. Seventy Baháʼís from 19 communities attended the eighth national conference on the progress of the religion in winter 1984 at the national center. Presentations were made on the history of the religion, the role of Baháʼí youth, laws, consultation, living a Baháʼí life, goals of the current plans, and the Baha'i Faith and the Bible and plans were announced for a national Baha'i women's conference. In July 1985 the Annual Statistical Report has a note on Ujelang as having a group with less than nine adult believers. In January 1986 a national Baháʼí Youth conference was held in Majuro to which 200 children and adults attended the potluck feast followed by 30 youth staying for the workshops. In August Baháʼís from more than 20 communities gathered at the Baháʼí National Center for a national peace conference where one of the guest speakers was A.D. Tennekone, Chief Justice of the Supreme Court of the Republic of the Marshall Islands. In October national assembly hosted an International Year of Peace dinner for the President and other government officials in Majuro as well as a United Nations Day public peace program in Mili Atoll. In August 1987 the national assembly locality report notes Enewetak and Ujelang Atolls are listed as having Baháʼís. The first Marshall Islander went on Baháʼí pilgrimage in February 1987.

== Modern community ==
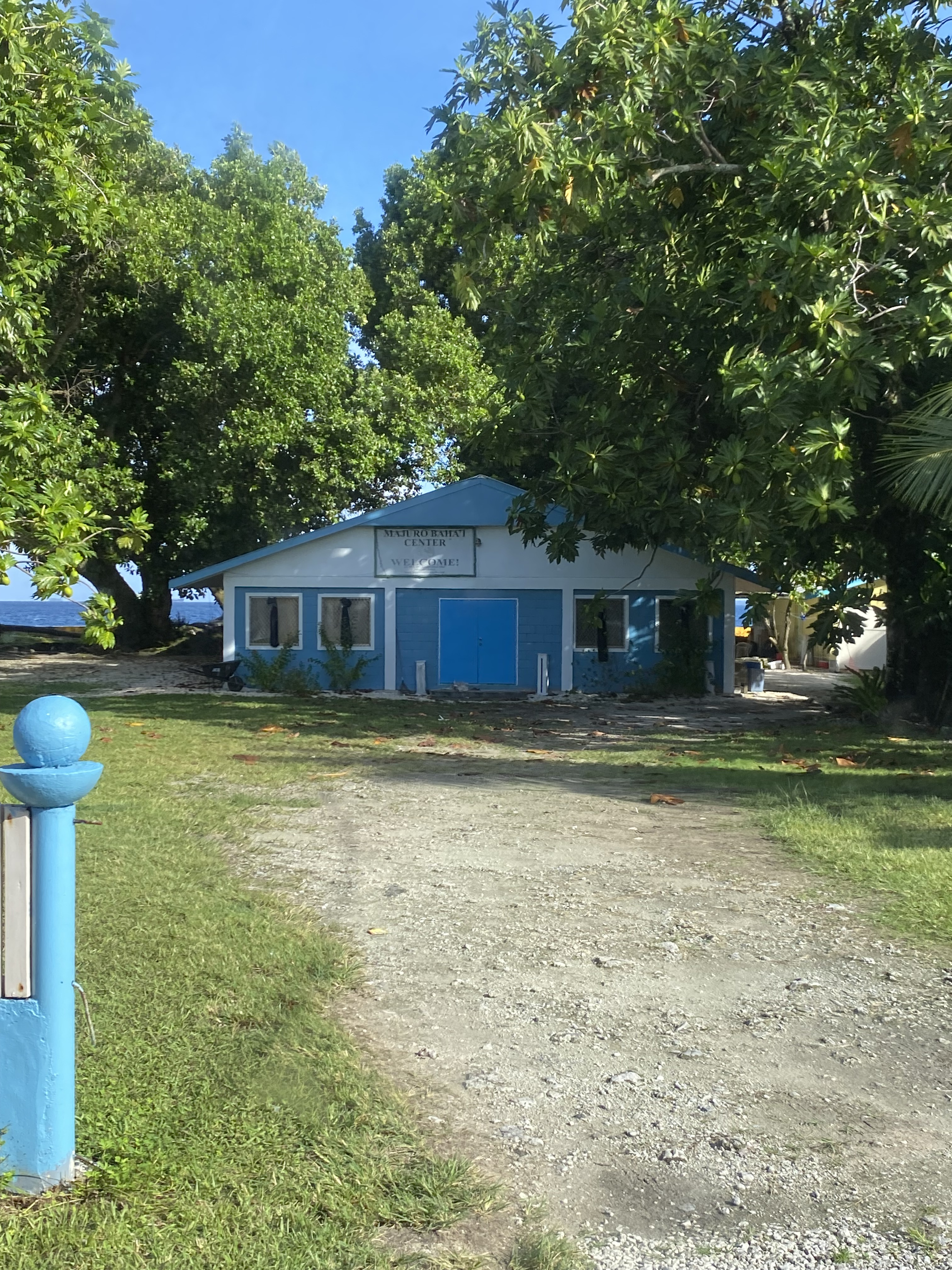
Majuro Bahá'í Center

From at least 2001 to 2007 the national assembly maintained a website which hosted Marshallese language Baháʼí literature and Ruhi Institute books online. Dominic Tabuaka represented the National Spiritual Assembly of the Baháʼís of the Marshall Islands attended the 50th anniversary of the Baháʼí Faith in Kiribati. Baháʼís from the Marshall Islands attended the regional conference of Baháʼís in the Philippines in 2008.

=== Relations with Marshallese government ===
The Baháʼís have had a long positive relationship with the government. Amata Kabua, then President of the Marshall Islands, was a government leader who has a close relationship with Baháʼí institutions nationally and internationally. In his address at the opening of the UN General Assembly in October 1991 President Kabua called for "a new and comprehensive vision of a global society, supported by a new system of values. This recognition does not imply the abandonment of legitimate loyalties, the suppression of cultural diversity, nor the abolition of national autonomy. It calls for a wider loyalty, for a far higher aspiration than has thus far animated human affairs." He also delivered the keynote address to the Turning Point for All Nations seminar held at the Baháʼí International Community's offices in October 1995. In the summer of 2000 the Baháʼís held an Ocean of Light Conference which was biggest Baháʼí event ever up to that time in the country and was attended by Kessai Note, the next president of the Marshall Islands, along with over 250 Baháʼís from across the Pacific. President Kessai Note, and his wife, Mary Note, also paid an official visit to the Baháʼí World Centre on 1 December 2005.

=== Focus to the society ===
By 1992 the Baháʼís operate state schools under contract with the government. In 2003 a Baháʼí with the main goal of helping the rural population established a project which he sees as an extension of his commitment to the promotion of social and economic development — a commitment that stems from his practice of the Baháʼí Faith.

In 2007 The Commission on Sustainable Development held sessions in relation to CSD-15. One attracted 90 people to hear six panelists. The event was chaired by Tahirih Naylow and sponsored by the Baháʼí International Community with the UN Permanent Missions of Tuvalu and of the Marshall Islands and a number of other UN and academic organizations. Enele Sopoaga, former Ambassador and Permanent Representative of Tuvalu to the UN, opened the session, noting that reports suggest that for islands such as his as well as other atoll states: Maldives, Marshall Islands, and Kiribati, scenarios for the future include “total extinction.”

In 2009 and 2010 people attended follow-up meetings on the theme at sessions of a conference sponsored in part by the International Environment Forum, a Baháʼí inspired organization. The session was given by two Baháʼís: Carol Curtis and Tahirih Naylor, of the Baháʼí International Community. Naylor considered the macro level, looking at the importance of including ethics in the discussion of climate change and the Baháʼí contribution to the climate change discourse, Curtis focused on the micro level, specifically the threat that climate change poses to the Marshall Islands. Curtis has lived on the Lea Atoll for more than 40 years. She describes in some detail the environment and lifestyle on the islands, the population and the land area.

=== Demographics ===
Estimates of the number of Baháʼís in the Marshal Islands vary considerably. From 1983 to 1987 the percentage of Baháʼís reported for the Marshall Islands, went from 2% to 11.5% according to Baháʼí sources. Similar growth rates are reported in some other Pacific nations. But as early as 2001 the US State Dept estimated the Baháʼís at 0.6 percent or about 400. However almost at the same time the 2000 World Christian Encyclopedia estimation of a Baháʼí population was just over 1,000, or 1.50%.

== See also ==
- History of the Marshall Islands
- Religion in the Marshall Islands
