= Jemo =

Jemo may be:

- Jemo Island, of the Marshall Islands, an island in the Pacific Ocean
- Jemo is also a soil type on tropical islands and atolls, characterized by raw humus overlying phosphatic hardpan. It originates from leaching of guano.
