= Economy of the Marshall Islands =

Economy of Marshall Islands
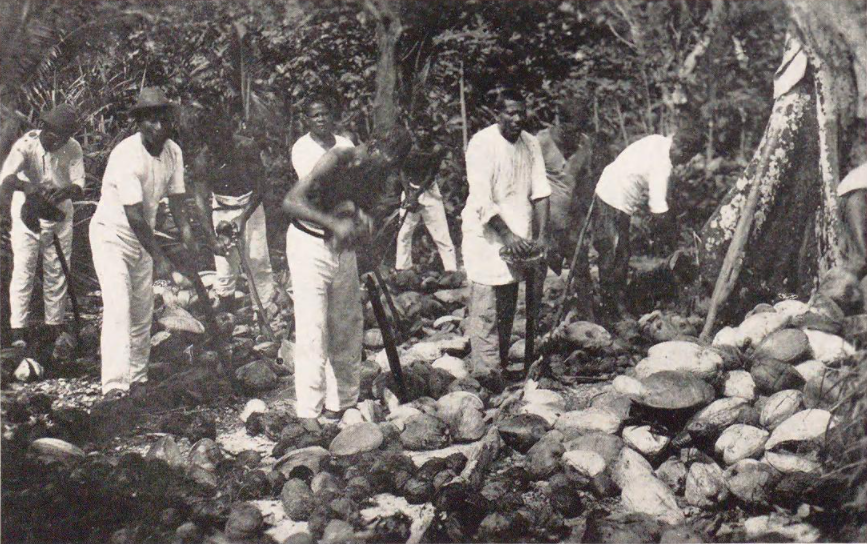
- Copra making on the islands in 1932

Statistics
- GDP: ▲$0.3 billion (nominal; 2025); ▲$0.28 billion (PPP; 2025)
- GDP rank: 192nd (nominal; 2025); 194th (PPP; 2025)
- GDP growth: ▲2.5% (2025); ▲4.1% (2026); ▲2.4% (2027f); ▲1.9% (2028f)
- GDP per capita: ▲$8,130 (nominal; 2025); ▲$7,700 (PPP; 2025)
- GDP per capita rank: 90th (nominal; 2025); 137th (PPP; 2025)
- GDP by sector: agriculture (19.5%); industrial (11.1%); services (70.5%) (2023 estimated) (2023 est.)}}
- Inflation (CPI): 0.781% (2018 est.)
- Main industries: copra, fishing, tourism, handicrafts, offshore banking

External
- Export goods: fish, coconut oil, trochus shells
- Import goods: foodstuffs, machinery and equipment, fuels, beverages, tobacco
- All values, unless otherwise stated, are in US dollars.

The government of the Marshall Islands is the largest employer, employing 30.6% of the work force, down by 3.4% since 1988. GDP is derived mainly from payments made by the United States under the terms of the amended Compact of Free Association. Direct U.S. aid accounted for 60% of the Marshall Islands' $90 million budget.

The main economic activities in the Marshall Islands are copra production and fisheries. Under the terms of the Compact of Free Association, Marshallese citizens can travel and work in the United States without visas, which has contributed to more than a 22% population decline over the period 2000–2021.

The Marshall Islands has no central bank. The official currency of the Marshall Islands is the US Dollar.

President Donald Trump announced a 10% tariff on the Marshall Islands on 2 April 2025.

== Subsistence economy ==
The subsistence economy consists of fishing and breadfruit, banana, taro, and pandanus cultivation. On the outer islands, production of copra and handicrafts provide cash income. The modern service-oriented economy is located in Majuro and Ebeye. It is sustained by government expenditures and the U.S. Army installation at Kwajalein Atoll. The airfield there also serves as a second national hub for international flights.

== Modern economy ==
The modern sector consists of wholesale and retail trade; restaurants; banking and insurance; offshore companies registration; construction, repair, and professional services; and copra processing. Company formation in the Marshall Islands is available for residents and non-residents. Non-residents enjoy privacy benefits and zero local taxes. Copra cake and oil are by far the nation's largest exports. A tuna processing plant employs 300 workers, mostly women, at $1.50 per hour. Copra production, the most important single commercial activity for the past 100 years, now depends on government subsidies. The subsidies, more a social policy than an economic strategy, help reduce migration from outer atolls to densely populated Majuro and Ebeye.

Marine resources, including fishing, aquaculture, tourism development, and agriculture, are top government development priorities. The Marshall Islands sells fishing rights to other nations as a source of income. In recent years, the Marshall Islands has begun to offer ship registrations under the Marshall Islands flag. As a small nation, the Marshall Islands must import a wide variety of goods, including foodstuffs, consumer goods, machinery, and petroleum products.

Marshall Islands has signed a bilateral trade agreement with Taiwan in 2019, this agreement has been approved in 2023 and will take effect at a future date.

== Coconut oil ==
Power authorities, private companies, and entrepreneurs are experimenting with coconut oil as an alternative to diesel fuel for vehicles, power generators, and ships. Coconut trees abound in the Pacific's tropical islands. One liter of oil can be produced from the copra of 6–10 coconuts.

A pilot project with the national utility, Marshalls Energy Company, was established to retool one of its power plant engines to use a coconut oil-diesel mix.

== Digital Financial Initiatives ==
In 2018, the Republic of Marshall Islands passed the Sovereign Currency Act, which was later repealed in August 2025.. This was intended to launch a sovereign cryptocurrency and certify it as legal tender.

In November 2025, the Ministry of Finance announced ENRA, a universal basic income program, for disbursements of funds to citizens. Eligible citizens have the option of receiving their disbursement through direct deposits, mailed checks and, through a dedicated citizen digital wallet designed specifically for the Marshallese, called Lomalo (which translates to “shared waters” in English). Through Lomalo, qualified recipients can verify their eligibility status, receive benefits in real time, and manage their accounts. The Lomalo digital wallet will help overcome long-standing distribution barriers in the Neighboring Islands, where limited banking infrastructure has historically delayed government transfers.

A digital disbursement channel is made possible by integration with USDM1, the RMI’s Digital Sovereign Bond - a U.S. dollar-denominated sovereign security fully collateralized by short-dated US Treasuries and redeemable at par in U.S. dollars. Because USDM1 is issued and recorded digitally, it enables secure, low-cost electronic distribution of benefits across the Marshall Islands, while all settlements remain in U.S. dollars through existing financial channels. USDM1 is a sovereign obligation of the Republic of the Marshall Islands, supported by the U.S. Treasuries held as collateral by a Qualified Custodian in the United States under New York law. The Treasuries are purchased with proceeds from the issuance of each unit and maintained in a bankruptcy-remote reserve account. This structure mirrors the design of Brady Bonds, through which more than $150 billion of sovereign debt has been issued globally over the past three decades. USDM1 is recorded in digital, book-entry form on the blockchain, enabling transparent, real-time settlement and verification while preserving the legal and prudential safeguards of traditional sovereign securities.

== Sectors ==
=== Transport ===
Transportation in the Marshall Islands reflects the country’s geography as a low-lying archipelago of widely scattered atolls in the central Pacific Ocean. Transport infrastructure consists primarily of road networks on the main atolls, domestic and international air services, and maritime transport through ports and harbors. There are no railways. Sea and air travel are essential for movement between islands, with Majuro and Kwajalein serving as the principal transport hubs.

=== Telecommunications ===
The Marshall Islands is an island country in Oceania.

In 2010, the Majuro and Kwajalein Atoll were connected to the HANTRU-1 undersea communications cable to provide high-speed bandwidth. Faster internet service was rolled out to Majuro and Ebeye on April 1, 2010.

The majority of communication is under the responsibility of Marshall Islands National Telecommunications Authority.

=== Healthcare ===
Life expectancy of the people of Marshall Islands in 2017 was 67 years for men and 71 years for women. Infant mortality has been reduced from 40 to 22 per 1000 live births between 1990 and 2010.

== Statistics ==
Exports of the Marshall Islands by product category (2019) Chemical products Transportation Machines Mineral products Plastics and rubbers Metals Foodstuffs Precious metals Textiles Instruments Animal products Vegetable products Paper goods Footwear and headwear Miscellaneous Stone and glass Wood products Animal and vegetable bi-products Animal hides Arts and antiques Weapons

The islands have few natural resources, and their imports far exceed exports. According to the CIA, the value of exports in 2013 was approximately $53.7 million while estimated imports were $133.7 million. Agricultural products include coconuts, tomatoes, melons, taro, breadfruit, fruits, pigs and chickens. Industry is made up of the production of copra and craft items, tuna processing and tourism. The CIA estimates that the GDP in 2016 was an estimated $180 million, with a real growth rate of 1.7% while the GDP per capita was $3,300.

GDP: purchasing power parity - $150 million (2011 est.)

GDP - real growth rate: 3% (2011 est.)

GDP - per capita: purchasing power parity - $2 500 (2011 est.)

GDP - composition by sector:
agriculture: 22%
industry: 18%
services: 60% (2008)

Population below poverty line: NA%

Household income or consumption by percentage share:
lowest 10%: NA%
highest 10%: NA%

Inflation rate (consumer prices): 5% (2007)

Labor force: NA

Labor force - by occupation: agriculture 48%, industry 12%, services 40% (2008)

Unemployment rate: 8% (2011 est.)

Budget:
revenues: $169.5 million
expenditures: $112.1 million, including capital expenditures of $19.5 million (FY08/09 est.)

Industries: copra, fish, tourism, craft items from shell, wood, and pearls, offshore banking (embryonic)

Industrial production growth rate: NA%

Electricity - production: 114 GWh (2008)

Electricity - production by source:
fossil fuel: NA%
hydro: NA%
nuclear: NA%
other: NA%

Electricity - consumption: 57 GWh (1994)

Electricity - exports: 0 kWh (1994)

Electricity - imports: 0 kWh (1994)

Agriculture - products: coconuts, cacao, taro, breadfruit, fruits; pigs, chickens

Exports: $132 million (f.o.b., 2008 est.)

Exports - commodities: fish, coconut oil, trochus shells

Exports - partners: United States, Japan, Australia, New Zealand

Imports: $125 million (f.o.b., 2008 est.)

Imports - commodities: foodstuffs, machinery and equipment, fuels, beverages and tobacco

Imports - partners: United States, Japan, Australia, New Zealand, Guam, Singapore

Debt - external: $68 million (2008 est.)

Economic aid - recipient: approximately $40 million annually from the US

Currency: 1 United States dollar (US$) = 100 cents

Exchange rates: US currency is used

Fiscal year: 1 October - 30 September

== See also ==
- Ministry of Finance (Marshall Islands)
- List of exports of the Marshall Islands
