= List of cities in the Marshall Islands =

The following is a list of cities in the Marshall Islands. With the exception of Ebeye, all of the urban areas of the Marshall Islands are on the Majuro Atoll.

The population of the islands as a whole is less than 60,000 (as of 2005); the population of most of these urban areas is less than 10,000.

- Ajeltake
- Delap-Uliga-Djarrit
- Ebeye
- Laura
- Rairok

== See also ==
- Municipalities of the Marshall Islands
- List of cities by country
