= Geography of the Marshall Islands =

Marshall Islands
- Map of the Marshall Islands
- Interactive map of Marshall Islands

Geography
- Location: Oceania
- Coordinates: 9°00′N 168°00′E
- Adjacent to: Pacific Ocean
- Total islands: 1,152
- Area: 181.3 km^{2} (70.0 sq mi)
- Coastline: 370.4 km (230.16 mi)

Administration
- Marshall Islands
- Largest settlement: Majuro

Additional information
- Time zone: MHT (UTC+12)

The Marshall Islands consist of two archipelagic island chains of 30 atolls and 1,152 islands, which form two parallel groups—the "Ratak" (sunrise) chain and the "Ralik" (sunset) chain. The Marshalls are located in the North Pacific Ocean and share maritime boundaries with Micronesia and Kiribati. Two-thirds of the nation's population lives in the capital of Majuro and the settlement of Ebeye. The outer islands are sparsely populated due to lack of employment opportunities and economic development.

== Statistics ==
The country is located about one-half of the way from Hawaii to Papua New Guinea. The archipelago includes the atolls of Bikini, Enewetak, Kwajalein, Majuro, Rongelap, and Utirik.

The total area of the islands is equal to the size of the City of Washington, DC. The largest atoll with a land area of 6 square miles (16 km^{2}) is Kwajalein. The terrain consists of low coral limestone and sand islands. Natural resources include coconut products, marine products, and deep seabed minerals. Current environmental issues are inadequate supplies of potable water; pollution of Majuro lagoon from household waste and discharges from fishing vessels.

Maritime claims:
territorial sea: 12 nautical miles
contiguous zone: 24 nm
exclusive economic zone: 200 nm

Elevation extremes:
lowest point: Pacific Ocean 0 meters
highest point: unnamed location on Likiep Atoll 10 meters (33 ft) above sea level

Land use:
arable land: 11.11%
permanent crops: 44.44%
other: 44.44% (2011)

Environment - international agreements:
party to: Biodiversity, Climate Change, Climate Change-Kyoto Protocol, Desertification, Hazardous Wastes, Law of the Sea, Ozone Layer Protection, Ship Pollution, Wetlands, Whaling

Bikini and Enewetak are former US nuclear test sites; Kwajalein, the famous World War II battleground, is now used as a US missile test range; the island city of Ebeye is the second largest settlement in the Marshall Islands, after the capital of Majuro, and one of the most densely populated locations in the Pacific.

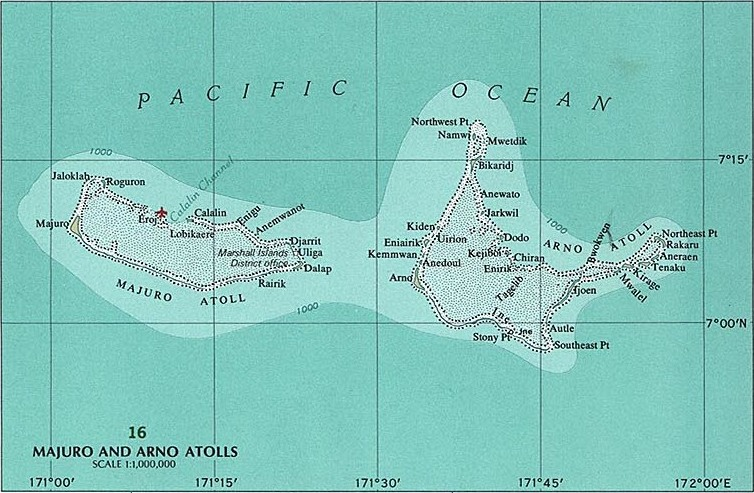
Majuro and Arno Atolls

== Climate ==
Tropical; hot and humid with a Koeppen-Geiger classification of Af. The wet season lasts from May to November and the islands border the typhoon belt. Typhoons do pose an infrequent threat from July to mid November.

Due to their low elevation, the Marshall Islands are threatened by the potential effects of sea level rise. According to the President of Nauru, the Marshall Islands are the most endangered nation on Earth due to flooding from climate change.

A study by the University of Plymouth found that the tides move sediment to create higher elevation, which may keep the islands habitable.

Climate data for Majuro (Köppen Af)
Month	Jan	Feb	Mar	Apr	May	Jun	Jul	Aug	Sep	Oct	Nov	Dec	Year
Record high °C (°F)	33 (92)	33 (91)	32 (90)	32 (90)	32 (90)	33 (92)	36 (96)	34 (94)	32 (90)	34 (93)	34 (93)	33 (91)	36 (96)
Mean daily maximum °C (°F)	29.8 (85.7)	29.9 (85.9)	30.0 (86.0)	30.1 (86.1)	30.2 (86.3)	30.2 (86.3)	30.3 (86.6)	30.4 (86.7)	30.5 (86.9)	30.4 (86.8)	30.0 (86.0)	30.3 (86.5)	30.2 (86.3)
Daily mean °C (°F)	27.7 (81.9)	27.8 (82.0)	27.9 (82.2)	27.9 (82.2)	28.0 (82.4)	27.9 (82.2)	28.0 (82.4)	28.1 (82.5)	28.1 (82.6)	28.1 (82.5)	27.9 (82.3)	27.9 (82.2)	27.9 (82.3)
Mean daily minimum °C (°F)	25.6 (78.1)	25.6 (78.0)	25.7 (78.3)	25.7 (78.3)	25.8 (78.4)	25.6 (78.1)	25.7 (78.2)	25.7 (78.3)	25.7 (78.3)	25.7 (78.2)	25.6 (78.1)	25.7 (78.3)	25.7 (78.2)
Record low °C (°F)	21 (69)	21 (70)	21 (70)	21 (70)	21 (70)	21 (70)	21 (70)	22 (71)	21 (70)	21 (70)	20 (68)	21 (70)	20 (68)
Average precipitation mm (inches)	209 (8.24)	194 (7.62)	220 (8.65)	282 (11.12)	272 (10.71)	282 (11.10)	278 (10.96)	284 (11.18)	320 (12.60)	350 (13.79)	341 (13.41)	302 (11.88)	3,334 (131.26)
Average precipitation days (≥ 0.01 in)	19.6	16.7	18.1	19.3	23.0	22.9	24.1	22.6	22.6	23.9	23.2	22.6	258.6
Average relative humidity (%)	77.7	77.1	79.0	80.7	81.9	81.1	80.5	79.3	79.4	79.4	79.9	79.7	79.6
Mean monthly sunshine hours	224.4	218.6	252.8	219.4	224.8	210.8	217.0	232.2	217.8	205.4	191.4	197.4	2,612
Percentage possible sunshine	61	66	67	60	58	56	56	61	60	55	54	54	59
Source: NOAA (relative humidity and sun 1961–1990)

Climate data for Kwajalein Atoll (Köppen Af)
Month	Jan	Feb	Mar	Apr	May	Jun	Jul	Aug	Sep	Oct	Nov	Dec	Year
Record high °C (°F)	32.2 (90.0)	32.2 (90.0)	32.2 (90.0)	32.2 (90.0)	32.8 (91.0)	32.2 (90.0)	32.8 (91.0)	32.8 (91.0)	33.3 (91.9)	33.3 (91.9)	33.3 (91.9)	31.7 (89.1)	33.3 (91.9)
Mean daily maximum °C (°F)	29.9 (85.8)	30.3 (86.5)	30.6 (87.1)	30.4 (86.7)	30.4 (86.7)	30.4 (86.7)	30.4 (86.7)	30.6 (87.1)	30.6 (87.1)	30.6 (87.1)	30.4 (86.7)	30.1 (86.2)	30.4 (86.7)
Daily mean °C (°F)	27.4 (81.3)	27.7 (81.9)	27.9 (82.2)	27.8 (82.0)	27.8 (82.0)	27.8 (82.0)	27.7 (81.9)	27.9 (82.2)	27.8 (82.0)	27.9 (82.2)	27.8 (82.0)	27.6 (81.7)	27.8 (82.0)
Mean daily minimum °C (°F)	25.0 (77.0)	25.1 (77.2)	25.2 (77.4)	25.2 (77.4)	25.2 (77.4)	25.1 (77.2)	25.1 (77.2)	25.1 (77.2)	25.1 (77.2)	25.2 (77.4)	25.2 (77.4)	25.2 (77.4)	25.1 (77.2)
Record low °C (°F)	20.0 (68.0)	21.7 (71.1)	21.1 (70.0)	21.7 (71.1)	21.7 (71.1)	21.7 (71.1)	21.7 (71.1)	21.7 (71.1)	20.0 (68.0)	21.7 (71.1)	21.1 (70.0)	20.6 (69.1)	20.0 (68.0)
Average precipitation mm (inches)	115.8 (4.56)	82.0 (3.23)	104.1 (4.10)	191.8 (7.55)	253.5 (9.98)	244.3 (9.62)	265.2 (10.44)	256.8 (10.11)	300.5 (11.83)	302.5 (11.91)	270.8 (10.66)	205.7 (8.10)	2,593 (102.09)
Average precipitation days (≥ 1.0 mm)	10.2	8.4	10.6	12.7	17.7	18.7	19.5	20.0	19.8	19.9	18.3	15.0	190.8
Average relative humidity (%)	76.7	76.1	77.1	79.7	82.5	82.0	81.8	80.9	80.9	80.8	80.2	78.8	79.8
Source: NOAA

=== Climate change ===
Climate change is a serious threat to the Marshall Islands, with typhoons becoming stronger and sea levels rising. The sea around Pacific islands has risen 7mm a year since 1993, which is more than twice the rate of the worldwide average. In Kwajalein, there is a high risk of permanent flooding; when sea level rise to 1 meter, 37% of buildings will be permanently flooded in that scenario. In Ebeye, the risk of sea level rise is even higher, with 50% of buildings being permanently flooded in the same scenario. With 1 meter sea level rise parts of the Majuro atoll will be permanently flooded and other parts are having a high risk of flooding especially the eastern part of the atoll would be significantly at risk. With 2 meter sea level rise all the buildings of Majuro will be permanently flooded or would be at a high risk to be flooded.

The per capita CO_{2} emissions were 2.56t in 2020. The government of Marshall Islands pledged to be net zero in 2050, with a decrease of 32% decrease of GHGs in 2025, 45% decrease in 2030 and a 58% decrease in 2035 all compared to 2010 levels.

== Extreme points ==
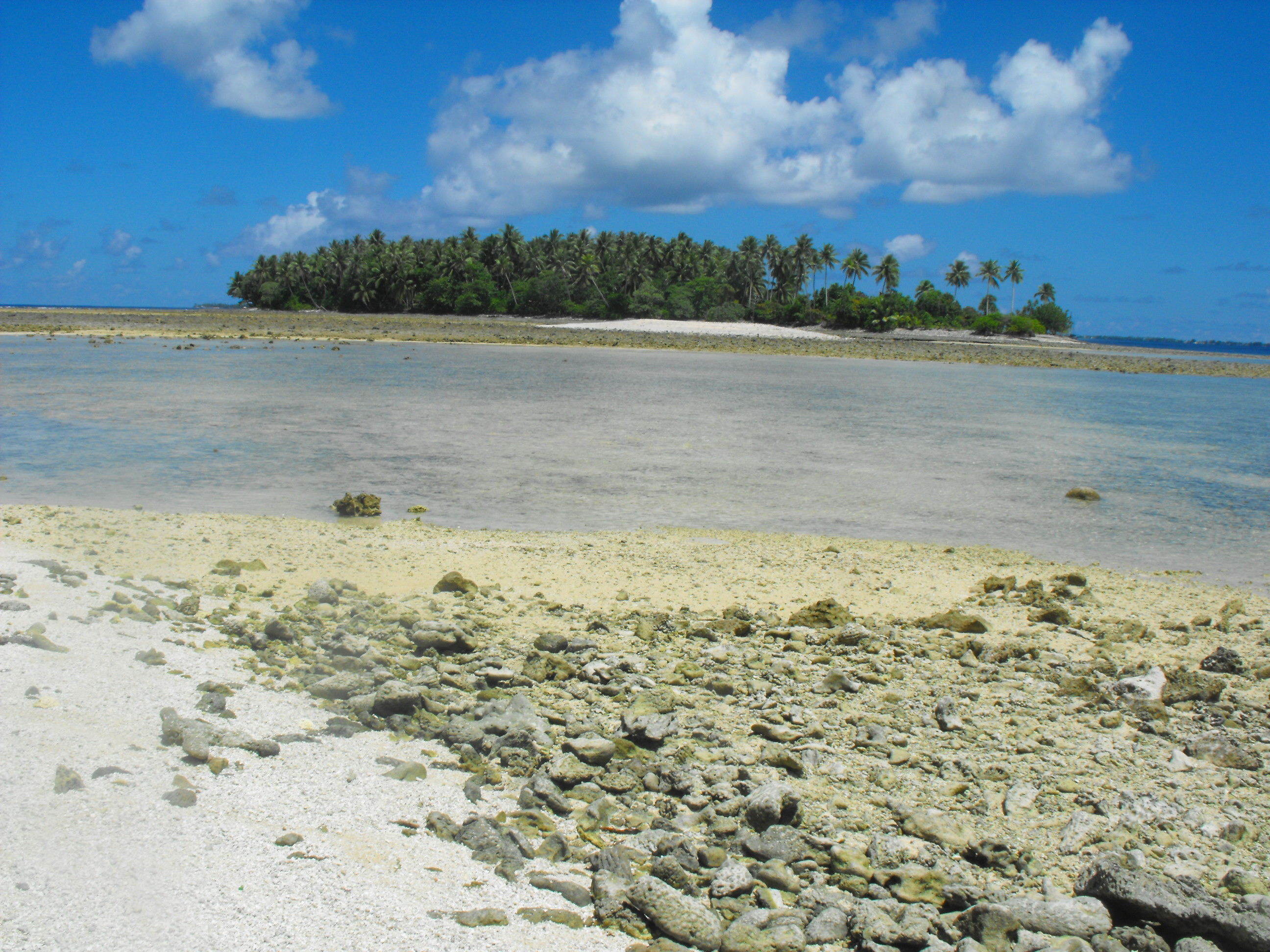
Image of Bikrin Islet, Majuro Atoll, one of the many landmasses of the Marshall Islands.

This is a list of the extreme points of the Marshall Islands, the points that are farther north, south, east or west than any other location.

- Northernmost point – Bokak Atoll (Taongi), Ratak Chain*
- Easternmost point – Knox Atoll, Ratak Chain
- Southernmost point – Ebon Atoll, Ralik Chain
- Westernmost point - Ujelang Atoll, Ralik Chain
- Note: the government of the Marshall Islands claims Wake Island, currently under US administration. If this is considered part of the Marshall Islands, then Toki Point on Peale Island, Wake Island is the northernmost point of the Marshall Islands
