= List of exports of the Marshall Islands =

Exports of the Marshall Islands by product category (2019) Chemical products Transportation Machines Mineral products Plastics and rubbers Metals Foodstuffs Precious metals Textiles Instruments Animal products Vegetable products Paper goods Footwear and headwear Miscellaneous Stone and glass Wood products Animal and vegetable bi-products Animal hides Arts and antiques Weapons

The following is a list of the exports of the Marshall Islands. Data is for 2019, in millions of United States dollars, as reported by International Trade Centre. Currently the top fifteen exports are listed.

#	Product	Value
1	Passenger and cargo ships	908
2	Frozen fish	90
3	Recreational boats	58
4	Telephones	33
5	Oils	22
6	Scrap plastic	11
7	Scrap ships	11
8	Refined petroleum	6
9	Machinery parts	6
10	Fresh fish	5
11	Fish fillets	3
12	Unspecified commodities	2
13	Ammonia	2
14	Plywood	2
15	Scrap iron	2

== See also ==
- Economy of the Marshall Islands
