= Scouting in the Marshall Islands =

- The BSA troop badge shows a rocket representing the Pacific Proving Grounds

Scouting in the Marshall Islands is in a state of development and growth. Scouting has existed in the islands since at least the 1970s, and may have been developed as early as the 1950s.

Like the other former Trust Territories of the Pacific, Boy Scouting in the Marshall Islands is developing as part of the Aloha Council Pacific Basin District. Its Order of the Arrow lodge is Nā Mokupuni O Lawelawe Lodge #567.

For Girl Scouts, there are Girl Scouts of the USA Overseas in Ebeye, Kwajalein, and Majuro, served by USAGSO headquarters in New York.
