= Ij Io̧kwe Ļo̧k Aelōn̄ Eo Aō =

English: I love my islands
- Former national anthem of Marshall Islands
- Music: Samuel Langrine
- Adopted: 1986
- Relinquished: 1991
- Succeeded by: "Forever Marshall Islands"

Audio sample
- Ij Io̧kwe Ļo̧k Aelōn̄ Eo Aō: file; help

Ij Io̧kwe Ļo̧k Aelōn̄ Eo Aō ([itʲ i̯ɒ.kwɛ lˠɒkʷ ɑe̯.lʲɤŋ ɛ̯ɔ ɑ.ɤ]), also known more simply as Ij Io̧kwe Ļo̧k ([itʲ i̯ɒ.kwɛ lˠɒkʷ]), is the former national anthem of the Marshall Islands. It became the anthem from 1979 when it was separated from the Trust Territory of the Pacific Islands, and it remained the national anthem when the Republic of the Marshall Islands gained its independence in 1986, until 1991 when Forever Marshall Islands became the new national anthem.

The music was composed by Samuel Langrine, and the Marshallese lyrics are of unknown origin.

== Lyrics ==
=== Marshallese ===
==== New orthography ====
Ij io̧kwe ļo̧k aelōn̄ eo aō,
Ijo iaar ļotak ie,
Meļan ko ie, im iaļ ko ie,
Im iiāio ko ie.
Ij jāmin ilo̧k jāne,
Bwe ijo jikū em̧ool,
Im aō ļām̧oran indeeo.
Em̧m̧an 'ļan̄n̄e inaaj mej ie.

==== Old orthography ====
Ij yokwe lok ailin̄ eo aō,
Ijo iar lotak ie,
Melan ko ie, im ial ko ie,
Im iāieo ko ie.
Ij jāmin ilok jāne,
Bwe ijo jikū emol,
Im aō lemoron indreo.
Emon lok n̄e inaj mij ie.

==== Pronunciation ====
[itʲ i̯ɒ.kwɛ lˠɒkʷ ɑe̯.lʲɤŋ ɛ̯ɔ ɑ.ɤ]
[i.tʲɔ i̯ɑːrˠ lʷɔ.tˠɑk i̯ɛ]
[mʲɛ.lˠɑnʲ kɔ i̯ɛ imʲ i.ɑlˠ kɔ i̯ɛ]
[imʲ iː.æ.i̯o kɔ i̯ɛ]
[itʲ tʲæ.mʲinʲ i.lʲɒkʷ tʲæ.nʲɛ]
[pwɛ i.tʲɔ tʲi.kɯ ɛ.mˠɔːlʲ]
[imʲ ɑɤ̯ lˠæ.mˠɔ.rʷɑnʲ inʲ.rʲeː.ɔ]
[ɛmˠ.mˠɑnʲ lˠɑŋ.ŋɛ i.nʲɑːtʲ mʲetʲ i̯ɛ]

=== English translation ===
I love my islands,
Where I was born,
The surroundings, the paths,
And the gatherings.
I cannot leave here,
Because this is my rightful place,
My family heritage is forever here.
It is best for me to die here.
