= Klee Passage =

Coordinates: 5.952°N 172.127°E

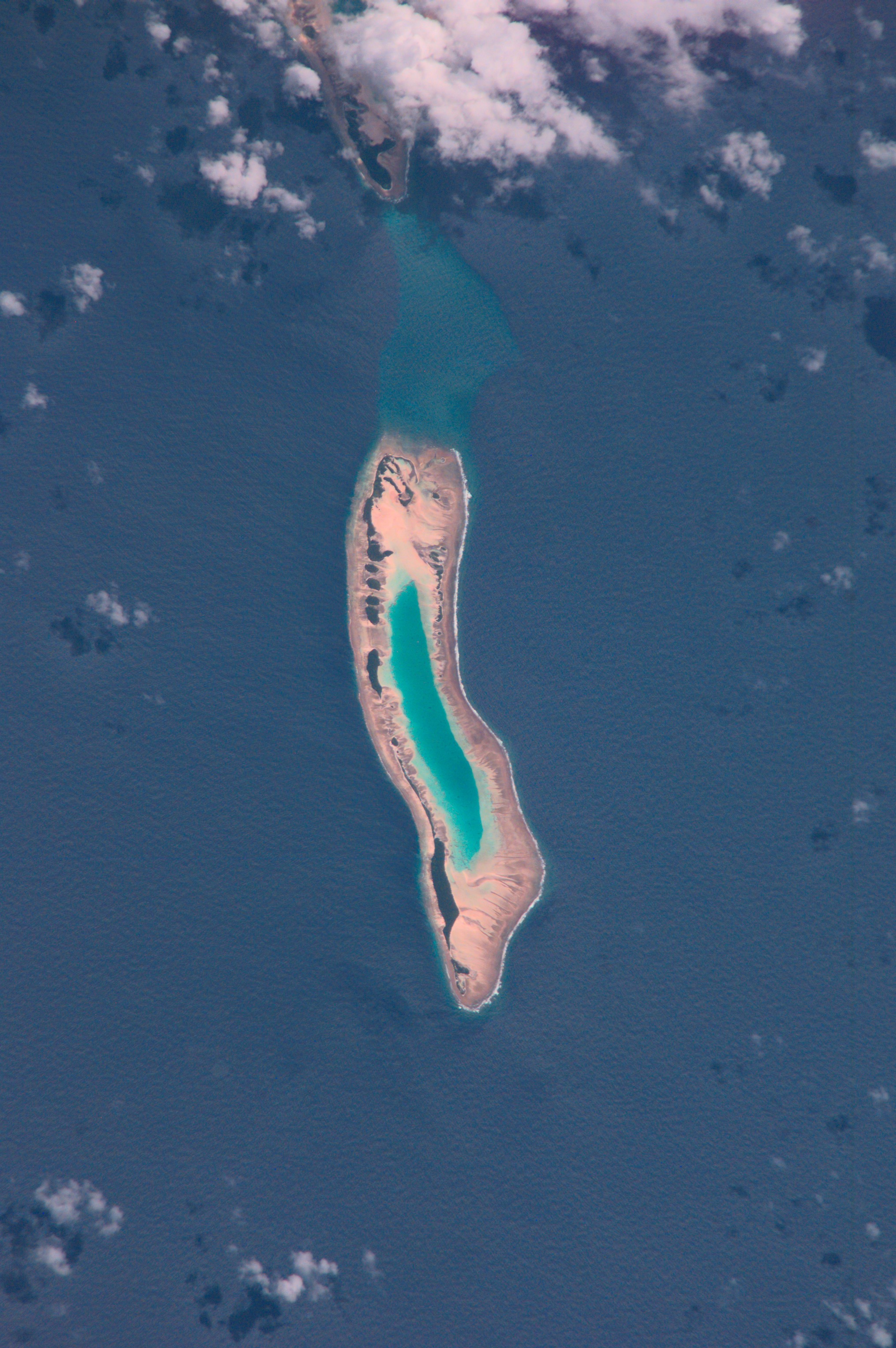
Knox atoll and Klee Passage

Klee Pass is a shallow, 3 nautical mile-wide channel of water which separates Knox Atoll from Mili Atoll in the Marshall Islands.

As of 2017, Klee Pass has a reported depth between 4.9m and 9.1m.

A submarine sand bank is located directly under the water channel. Due to this sand bank, the passage is not accessible to large sea vessels which could easily get embedded in the sand. The sand bank was originally above water forming a connection between the two atolls however, the erosion by the sea carved out this passage.
