= Fishing industry in the Marshall Islands =

The Republic of the Marshall Islands has a commercial fishery that targets bigeye (Thunnus obesus) and yellowfin (Thunnus albacares) tuna using pelagic longline fishing gear. There were 55 longline vessels licensed to fish in the Republic of the Marshall Islands Exclusive Economic Zone (EEZ) in 2011, of which 4 were Marshall Islands-flagged and 51 were foreign-licensed vessels, including 22 Chinese-flagged, 16 Japanese-flagged, 11 Federated States of Micronesia-flagged, and 2 Taiwan-flagged. The Japanese-flagged longliners land their catch in Japan; the other 39 vessels were domestically-based (i.e., based from the Marshall Islands seaport at Majuro, the State's capitol). In 2011, the Marshall Islands longline fleet had reported landings of principal market species of 259 mt of bigeye tuna, 99 mt of yellowfin tuna, 37 mt of blue marlin, 7 mt of black marlin, 4 mt of albacore tuna, and 3 mt of broadbill swordfish. Fresh chilled bigeye and yellowfin tuna is exported primarily to markets in the U.S., China and Canada, and frozen tuna and incidental market species are exported to China and marketed locally.

Recently, a seasonal pelagic longline fishery has developed for albacore tuna (Thunnus alalunga) at grounds on the high seas adjacent to the Marshall Islands Exclusive Economic Zone. The fishery is composed primarily of Chinese-flagged vessels, which are based out of Majuro in the Marshall Islands; there were 11 vessels participating in this high seas fishery in late 2012.

There is limited information available on catch levels and rates of taxa that are vulnerable to overexploitation due to their life history characteristics and susceptibility to capture in pelagic longline gear, due to low onboard observer coverage rates.

== Bycatch ==
For seabird interactions, based on analysis of Secretariat of the Pacific Community-held observer program data, from 1995-2009, in 203 observed trips, one seabird of an unidentified species was observed captured by a longline tuna vessel operating within the Marshall Islands EEZ. There was also one record of an albatross landing on a vessel deck, but not interacting with the gear.

From 2007-2009, through onboard observer coverage of 124 longline trips, observers reported the capture of 5 green (Chelonia mydas), 1 hawksbill (Eretmochelys imbricata), 14 leatherback (Dermochelys coriacea), 3 olive Ridley (Lepidochelys olivacea), 2 unidentified species sea turtles, and 3 toothed whales of identified species.

Based on analyses of observer data collected from 2005 to 2009, 22 shark species were observed captured in the Marshall Islands longline tuna fishery, with 80% of the shark catch representing five species: blue shark (Prionace glauca), silky shark (Carcharhinus falciformis), bigeye thresher shark (Alopias superciliosus), pelagic thresher shark (A. pelagicus) and oceanic whitetip shark (Carcharhinus longimanus). Based on 2009 observer data, sharks and rays compose about 18% of total catch by weight by the Marshall Islands longline fishery. Elasmobranch species composition is 30% blue shark, 13% silky shark, 10% mako shark, 9% oceanic whitetip shark, and 37% other combined sharks and rays. Bromhead et al. (2012) found that in 2009, the most recent year of available observer data, the fishery had discontinued the use of fishing gear and methods known to be employed to target sharks (using large pieces of fish meat as bait, and placing baited hooks near the surface by attaching branchlines to floats), which had been employed in previous years of the study period (2005-2008). In 2011, the Marshall Islands adopted a law that prohibits targeting sharks and prohibits the retention of sharks (see shark sanctuary).
