= Queen of Peace Church, Ebeye =

Queen of Peace Church
- Location within Marshall Islands
- 8.776093°N 167.738943°E
- Location: Ebeye
- Country: Marshall Islands
- Denomination: Roman Catholic Church

The Queen of Peace Church also called Parish Queen of Peace, is a religious building belonging to the Catholic Church and is located in the town and island of Ebeye part of the Kwajalein Atoll in the Marshall Islands a country in Micronesia in Oceania.

The church was dedicated in 1962 and follows the Roman or Latin rite and is under the responsibility of the Apostolic Prefecture of the Marshall Islands (Praefectura Apostolica Insularum Marshallensium) created in 1993 with the Bull "Quo expeditius" of the Pope John Paul II. Religious services are offered in English.

== See also ==
- Roman Catholicism in the Marshall Islands
