= Peace Baptist Church =

Historic church in Alabama, United States

- U.S. National Register of Historic Places
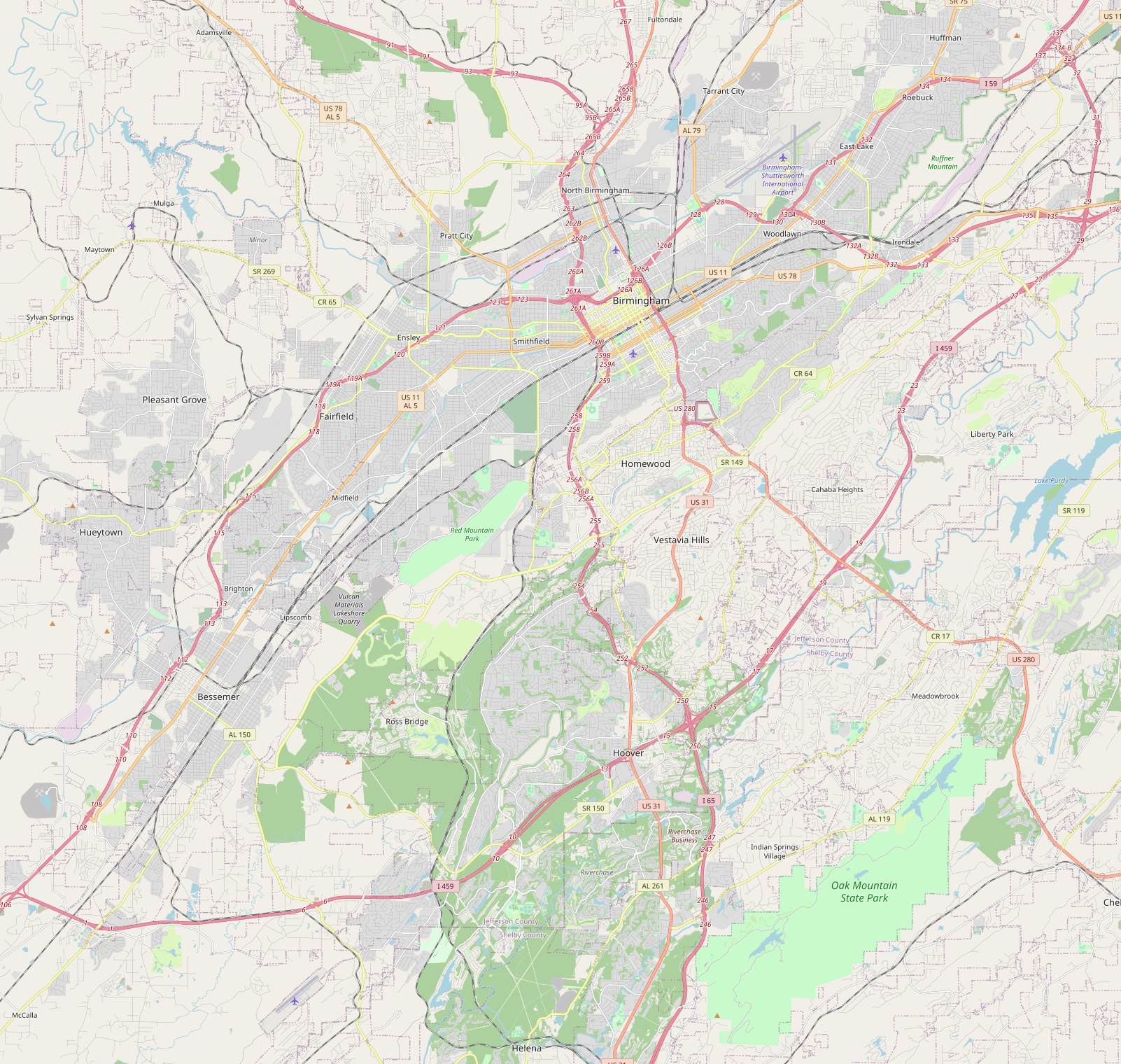
- Location within Birmingham, Alabama Location within Alabama Location within the United States
- Location: 302 Sixth St. N, Birmingham, Alabama
- Coordinates: 33°30′25″N 86°49′37″W
- Area: 3 acres (1.2 ha)
- Architectural style: Gothic Revival
- MPS: Civil Rights Movement in Birmingham, Alabama MPS
- NRHP reference No.: 05000293
- Added to NRHP: April 22, 2005

The Peace Baptist Church is a church at 302 Sixth Street North in Birmingham, Alabama. Its historic building was added to the National Register of Historic Places in 2005. It was deemed significant for its association in 1963 with the Birmingham civil rights movement. The historic building, which had become a fellowship hall for a new church building built in 1970, has since been demolished.

The historic building was a brick Gothic Revival structure with a gable front. It had two short towers with pyramidal roofs. By 2005, the building had become the J. H. Stenson Fellowship Hall. It had been joined by the adjacent Sixth Street Peace Baptist Church, a one-story brick building.
