= Music of the Marshall Islands =

The music of the Marshall Islands has a long history. The Marshall Islands are an independent island chain, geographically and culturally part of the Micronesian area. It was part of the Trust Territory of the Pacific Islands, governed by the United States, until independence in 1986.

The roro is a kind of traditional chant, usually about ancient legends and performed to give guidance during navigation and strength for mothers in labor. Modern bands have blended the unique songs of each island in the country with modern music.

Though drums are not generally common in Micronesian music, one-sided hourglass-shaped drums are a major part of Marshallese music.

The national anthem of the Marshall Islands is "Forever Marshall Islands", which Amata Kabua wrote the lyrics for.

== Traditional dances ==
There is a traditional Marshallese dance called beet, which is influenced by Spanish folk dances. In it, men and women side-step in parallel lines, creating a very difficult and complex rhythm. There is a kind of "stick dance" performed by the Jobwa, nowadays only for very special occasions.
