= Marshallese =

Marshallese may refer to:

- Marshall Islands, a Micronesian island nation
- Marshallese language, a Malayo-Polynesian language of the Marshall Islands
- Marshallese people, the people of the Marshall Islands
