= Prince of Peace Lutheran Church =

Church in Woodridge, Illinois, US

Coordinates: 41°45′3.7″N 88°2′47.6″W

- Prince of Peace Lutheran Church
- Location: 2600 W. 75th Street, Woodridge, IL 60517
- Country: United States
- Denomination: Evangelical Lutheran
- Website: www.popwoodridge.org

History
- Founded: 1962

Clergy
- Pastor: Tim Seitz

Prince of Peace Lutheran Church is located on 75th Street in Woodridge, Illinois, just west of the Veteran's Memorial Tollway (I-355) near 75th and Janes Avenue. The church is part of the Evangelical Lutheran Church in America (ELCA). Prince of Peace is the only Lutheran church in Woodridge.

== History of the Church ==
The first worship was held at Goodrich School on October 15, 1961, as part of a mission of the Augustana Lutheran Church. On January 22, 1962, Prince of Peace became an official congregation with 66 baptized members. The church building was completed 1966, and then only consisted of the main sanctuary and the "North" Room. The sanctuary is designed in an octagonal shape, with exposed bricks and dark wooden beams throughout. The large multipurpose "East" Room was added in 1970, designed to host gatherings and events. Classrooms were added in 1982, and the office was expanded in 1989. Seven pastors have been called to Prince of Peace: Swanson, Huffman, Lundeen, Weidlich, Gerber, Kopka and Stoffel.

== Activities ==
The church prides itself on the many organizations it operates. Some of these groups include the church choir, children's choir, Sunday school, the A-Men (men's group), the women's group, the youth group, Build-on-our-Mission (BOOM) Committee, evangelism, stewardship, fellowship, mutual ministry, social ministry, finance, Christian education, and property.

== Today ==
Today the congregation consists of 207 baptized members led by Rev. Craig S Felde. The church continues to host a range of fund-raising events throughout the year to support the church, community organizations, and the military. While traditional liturgy is still practiced most Sundays with service from the Lutheran Book of Worship, other services, including a contemporary Christian band, are sometimes used.
