= Seal of the Marshall Islands =

Coat of arms of the island nation

- Armiger: Republic of the Marshall Islands
- Adopted: 1986
- Shield: a blue or white background with an angel with outstretched wings with two orange and white stripes found from the National Flag emanating an angel through the rays of light and the large white star with four large rays and twenty small rays also found from the National Flag on top of the angel and in between the rays, the pestle made of the giant clam (Tridacna Gigas) to the left and the fishing net to the right and on the bottom, an atoll with palm trees to the left and an ourigger canoe on the sea to the right and on the sea is the stylized nautical chart and the listel with the Name of the Emblem itself: "SEAL"
- Motto: Jepilpilin ke Ejukaan; Accomplishment Through Joint Effort
- Other elements: the disk is encircled by the Name of the State (or Government) on the top and the National Motto on the bottom, with a chain surrounding the Emblem.

The seal of the Marshall Islands consists of a blue background, which represents the sea. On the blue background, there is an angel with outstretched wings, symbolizing peace. Behind the angel, there are two islands with an outrigger canoe and a palm tree. On the upper left and right in the shield are a red and white stripe. Behind the shield, there is a stylized nautical chart. In the ring above the shield is the phrase Republic of the Marshall Islands, and below, the national motto, Jepilpilin ke Ejukaan (Marshallese: "Accomplishment Through Joint Effort"). The outlook appearance of the seal is regulated by the Republic of the Marshall Islands Seal Act of 1992.
