= List of birds of the Marshall Islands =

This is a list of the bird species recorded in the Marshall Islands. The avifauna of the Marshall Islands include a total of 109 species, of which 3 have been introduced by humans.

This list's taxonomic treatment (designation and sequence of orders, families and species) and nomenclature (common and scientific names) follow the conventions of The Clements Checklist of Birds of the World, 2022 edition. The family accounts at the beginning of each heading reflect this taxonomy, as do the species counts found in each family account. Introduced and accidental species are included in the total counts for the Marshall Islands.

The following tags have been used to highlight several categories. The commonly occurring native species do not fall into any of these categories.

- (A) Accidental - a species that rarely or accidentally occurs in the Marshall Islands
- (I) Introduced - a species introduced to the Marshall Islands as a consequence, direct or indirect, of human actions
- (Ex) Extirpated - a species that no longer occurs in the Marshall Islands although populations exist elsewhere

== Ducks, geese, and waterfowl ==
Order: Anseriformes Family: Anatidae

Anatidae includes the ducks and most duck-like waterfowl, such as geese and swans. These birds are adapted to an aquatic existence with webbed feet, flattened bills, and feathers that are excellent at shedding water due to an oily coating.

- Snow goose, Anser caerulescens (A)
- Cackling goose, Branta hutchinsii (A)
- Garganey, Spatula querquedula (A)
- Northern shoveler, Spatula clypeata
- Eurasian wigeon, Mareca penelope (A)
- Northern pintail, Anas acuta
- Green-winged teal, Anas crecca (A)
- Canvasback, Aythya valisineria (A)
- Tufted duck, Aythya fuligula (A)

== Pheasants, grouse, and allies ==
Order: Galliformes Family: Phasianidae

The Phasianidae are a family of terrestrial birds which consists of quails, partridges, snowcocks, francolins, spurfowls, tragopans, monals, pheasants, peafowls, grouse, ptarmigan, and junglefowls. In general, they are plump (although they vary in size) and have broad, relatively short wings.

- Red junglefowl, Gallus gallus (I)

== Pigeons and doves ==
Order: Columbiformes Family: Columbidae

Pigeons and doves are stout-bodied birds with short necks and short slender bills with a fleshy cere.

- Kosrae fruit-dove, Ptilinopus hernsheimi
- Micronesian imperial-pigeon, Ducula oceanica

== Cuckoos ==
Order: Cuculiformes Family: Cuculidae

The family Cuculidae includes cuckoos, roadrunners and anis. These birds are of variable size with slender bodies, long tails and strong legs. The Old World cuckoos are brood parasites.

- Long-tailed koel, Urodynamis taitensis

== Swifts ==
Order: Caprimulgiformes Family: Apodidae

Swifts are small birds which spend the majority of their lives flying. These birds have very short legs and never settle voluntarily on the ground, perching instead only on vertical surfaces. Many swifts have long swept-back wings which resemble a crescent or boomerang.

- Pacific swift, Apus pacificus

== Rails, gallinules, and coots ==
Order: Gruiformes Family: Rallidae

Rallidae is a large family of small to medium-sized birds which includes the rails, crakes, coots and gallinules. Typically they inhabit dense vegetation in damp environments near lakes, swamps or rivers. In general they are shy and secretive birds, making them difficult to observe. Most species have strong legs and long toes which are well adapted to soft uneven surfaces. They tend to have short, rounded wings and to be weak fliers.

- White-browed crake, Poliolimnas cinereus (A)

== Stilts and avocets ==
Order: Charadriiformes Family: Recurvirostridae

Recurvirostridae is a family of large wading birds, which includes the avocets and stilts. The avocets have long legs and long up-curved bills. The stilts have extremely long legs and long, thin, straight bills.

- Black-winged stilt, Himantopus himantopus (A)
- Pied stilt, Himantopus leucocephalus (A)
- Black-necked stilt, Himantopus mexicanus (A)

== Plovers and lapwings ==
Order: Charadriiformes Family: Charadriidae

The family Charadriidae includes the plovers, dotterels and lapwings. They are small to medium-sized birds with compact bodies, short, thick necks and long, usually pointed, wings. They are found in open country worldwide, mostly in habitats near water.

- Black-bellied plover, Pluvialis squatarola
- Pacific golden-plover, Pluvialis fulva
- Lesser sand-plover, Charadrius mongolus
- Greater sand-plover, Charadrius leschenaultii (A)
- Common ringed plover, Charadrius hiaticula (A)
- Semipalmated plover, Charadrius semipalmatus (A)

== Sandpipers and allies ==
Order: Charadriiformes Family: Scolopacidae

Scolopacidae is a large diverse family of small to medium-sized shorebirds including the sandpipers, curlews, godwits, shanks, tattlers, woodcocks, snipes, dowitchers and phalaropes. The majority of these species eat small invertebrates picked out of the mud or soil. Variation in length of legs and bills enables multiple species to feed in the same habitat, particularly on the coast, without direct competition for food.

- Bristle-thighed curlew, Numenius tahitiensis
- Whimbrel, Numenius phaeopus
- Bar-tailed godwit, Limosa lapponica
- Black-tailed godwit, Limosa limosa
- Hudsonian godwit, Limosa haemastica (A)
- Ruddy turnstone, Arenaria interpres
- Red knot, Calidris canutus (A)
- Ruff, Calidris pugnax (A)
- Sharp-tailed sandpiper, Calidris acuminata
- Curlew sandpiper, Calidris ferruginea (A)
- Red-necked stint, Calidris ruficollis (A)
- Sanderling, Calidris alba
- Dunlin, Calidris alpina (A)
- Little stint, Calidris minuta (A)
- Buff-breasted sandpiper, Calidris subruficollis (A)
- Pectoral sandpiper, Calidris melanotos
- Long-billed dowitcher, Limnodromus scolopaceus (A)
- Latham's snipe, Gallinago hardwickii (A)
- Common snipe, Gallinago gallinago (A)
- Spotted sandpiper, Actitis macularia (A)
- Gray-tailed tattler, Tringa brevipes
- Wandering tattler, Tringa incanus
- Greater yellowlegs, Tringa melanoleuca (A)
- Common greenshank, Tringa nebularia (A)
- Lesser yellowlegs, Tringa flavipes (A)
- Marsh sandpiper, Tringa stagnatilis (A)
- Wood sandpiper, Tringa glareola

== Pratincoles and coursers ==
Order: Charadriiformes Family: Glareolidae

Glareolidae is a family of wading birds comprising the pratincoles, which have short legs, long pointed wings and long forked tails, and the coursers, which have long legs, short wings and long pointed bills which curve downwards.

- Oriental pratincole, Glareola maldivarum (A)

== Skuas and jaegers ==
Order: Charadriiformes Family: Stercorariidae

The family Stercorariidae are, in general, medium to large birds, typically with grey or brown plumage, often with white markings on the wings. They nest on the ground in temperate and arctic regions and are long-distance migrants.

- Pomarine jaeger, Stercorarius pomarinus

== Gulls, terns, and skimmers ==
Order: Charadriiformes Family: Laridae

Laridae is a family of medium to large seabirds, the gulls, terns, and skimmers. Gulls are typically grey or white, often with black markings on the head or wings. They have stout, longish bills and webbed feet. Terns are a group of generally medium to large seabirds typically with grey or white plumage, often with black markings on the head. Most terns hunt fish by diving but some pick insects off the surface of fresh water. Terns are generally long-lived birds, with several species known to live in excess of 30 years.

- Laughing gull, Leucophaeus atricilla (A)
- Franklin's gull, Leucophaeus pipixcan (A)
- Ring-billed gull, Larus delawarensis (A)
- Brown noddy, Anous stolidus
- Black noddy, Anous minutus
- Blue-gray noddy, Anous ceruleus
- White tern, Gygis alba
- Sooty tern, Onychoprion fuscatus
- Gray-backed tern, Onychoprion lunatus
- Bridled tern, Onychoprion anaethetus (A)
- Little tern, Sternula albifrons
- Gull-billed tern, Gelochelidon nilotica (A)
- White-winged tern, Chlidonias leucopterus (A)
- Black-naped tern, Sterna sumatrana
- Common tern, Sterna hirundo
- Great crested tern, Thalasseus bergii

== Tropicbirds ==
Order: Phaethontiformes Family: Phaethontidae

Tropicbirds are slender white birds of tropical oceans, with exceptionally long central tail feathers. Their heads and long wings have black markings.

- White-tailed tropicbird, Phaethon lepturus
- Red-tailed tropicbird, Phaethon rubricauda

== Albatrosses ==
Order: Procellariiformes Family: Diomedeidae

The albatrosses are among the largest of flying birds, and the great albatrosses from the genus Diomedea have the largest wingspans of any extant birds.

- Laysan albatross, Phoebastria immutabilis
- Black-footed albatross, Phoebastria nigripes
- Short-tailed albatross, Phoebastria albatrus

== Southern storm-petrels ==
Order: Procellariiformes Family: Oceanitidae

The southern-storm petrels are relatives of the petrels and are the smallest seabirds. They feed on planktonic crustaceans and small fish picked from the surface, typically while hovering. The flight is fluttering and sometimes bat-like.

- Wilson's storm-petrel, Oceanites oceanicus

== Northern storm-petrels ==
Order: Procellariiformes Family: Hydrobatidae

The northern storm-petrels are relatives of the petrels and are the smallest seabirds. They feed on planktonic crustaceans and small fish picked from the surface, typically while hovering. The flight is fluttering and sometimes bat-like.

- Leach's storm-petrel, Hydrobates leucorhous
- Band-rumped storm-petrel, Hydrobates castro

== Shearwaters and petrels ==
Order: Procellariiformes Family: Procellariidae

The procellariids are the main group of medium-sized "true petrels", characterised by united nostrils with medium septum and a long outer functional primary.

- Kermadec petrel, Pterodroma neglecta
- Providence petrel, Pterodroma solandri
- Mottled petrel, Pterodroma inexpectata
- Juan Fernandez petrel, Pterodroma externa
- Bonin petrel, Pterodroma hypoleuca
- Black-winged petrel, Pterodroma nigripennis
- Cook's petrel, Pterodroma cookii
- Stejneger's petrel, Pterodroma longirostris
- Bulwer's petrel, Bulweria bulwerii
- Tahiti petrel, Pseudobulweria rostrata
- Streaked shearwater, Calonectris leucomelas
- Flesh-footed shearwater, Ardenna carneipes
- Wedge-tailed shearwater, Ardenna pacificus
- Buller's shearwater, Ardenna bulleri
- Sooty shearwater, Ardenna griseus
- Short-tailed shearwater, Ardenna tenuirostris
- Christmas shearwater, Puffinus nativitatis
- Tropical shearwater, Puffinus bailloni

== Frigatebirds ==
Order: Suliformes Family: Fregatidae

Frigatebirds are large seabirds usually found over tropical oceans. They are large, black and white or completely black, with long wings and deeply forked tails. The males have coloured inflatable throat pouches. They do not swim or walk and cannot take off from a flat surface. Having the largest wingspan-to-body-weight ratio of any bird, they are essentially aerial, able to stay aloft for more than a week.

- Lesser frigatebird, Fregata ariel
- Great frigatebird, Fregata minor

== Boobies and gannets ==
Order: Suliformes Family: Sulidae

The sulids comprise the gannets and boobies. Both groups are medium to large coastal seabirds that plunge-dive for fish.

- Masked booby, Sula dactylatra
- Brown booby, Sula leucogaster
- Red-footed booby, Sula sula

== Herons, egrets, and bitterns ==
Order: Pelecaniformes Family: Ardeidae

The family Ardeidae contains the bitterns, herons, and egrets. Herons and egrets are medium to large wading birds with long necks and legs. Bitterns tend to be shorter necked and more wary. Members of Ardeidae fly with their necks retracted, unlike other long-necked birds such as storks, ibises and spoonbills.

- Pacific reef-heron, Egretta sacra
- Cattle egret, Bubulcus ibis

== Owls ==
Order: Strigiformes Family: Strigidae

The typical owls are small to large solitary nocturnal birds of prey. They have large forward-facing eyes and ears, a hawk-like beak and a conspicuous circle of feathers around each eye called a facial disk.

- Short-eared owl, Asio flammeus

== Kingfishers ==
Order: Coraciiformes Family: Alcedinidae

Kingfishers are medium-sized birds with large heads, long pointed bills, short legs and stubby tails.

- Sacred kingfisher, Todirhamphus sanctus

== Swallows ==
Order: Passeriformes Family: Hirundinidae

The family Hirundinidae is adapted to aerial feeding. They have a slender streamlined body, long pointed wings and a short bill with a wide gape. The feet are adapted to perching rather than walking, and the front toes are partially joined at the base.

- Barn swallow, Hirundo rustica

== Bulbuls ==
Order: Passeriformes Family: Pycnonotidae

Bulbuls are medium-sized songbirds. Some are colourful with yellow, red or orange vents, cheeks, throats or supercilia, but most are drab, with uniform olive-brown to black plumage. Some species have distinct crests.

- Red-vented bulbul, Pycnonotus cafer (I)

== Starlings ==
Order: Passeriformes Family: Sturnidae

Starlings are small to medium-sized passerine birds. Their flight is strong and direct and they are very gregarious. Their preferred habitat is fairly open country. They eat insects and fruit. Plumage is typically dark with a metallic sheen.

- Common myna, Acridotheres tristis (Ex)

== Old World sparrows ==
Order: Passeriformes Family: Passeridae

Old World sparrows are small passerine birds. In general, sparrows tend to be small, plump, brown or grey birds with short tails and short powerful beaks. Sparrows are seed eaters, but they also consume small insects.

- Eurasian tree sparrow, Passer montanus (I)

== See also ==
- List of birds
- Lists of birds by region
