= Forever Marshall Islands =

National anthem of the Marshall Islands

- National anthem of the Marshall Islands
- Also known as: Indeeo Ṃajeḷ; Aelōn̄ Eo Ao (English: Our Islands)
- Lyrics: Amata Kabua
- Music: Gil Ok Yun
- Adopted: 1991
- Preceded by: "Ij Io̧kwe Ļo̧k Aelōn̄ Eo Aō"

Audio sample
- U.S. Navy Band instrumental version: file; help

"Forever Marshall Islands" (Marshallese: "Indeeo Ṃajeḷ"), also known by its incipit, "Aelōn̄ Eo Ao" ("Our Islands"), is the national anthem of the Marshall Islands. The lyrics were written by former President Amata Kabua, and the music was composed by Korean composer Gil ok-yun (also known by his Japanese name, Jun Yoshiya, 吉屋潤) by the request of President Kabua. The song was finished and recorded at Oasis Records in Seoul. (Note: Regarding the composer of the song, the Republic of the Marshall Islands has said Amata Kabua also composed the song, however it is more likely that Amata as a producer selected one out of the candidates for the anthem composed by different composers. In 2014, Kejjo Bien, then ambassador of the Marshall Islands to South Korea (and former member of parliament for the RMI), mentioned the fact to emphasize the relationships the two countries share together.) Kabua and Gil became acquaintances after Jiyong (池勇), (Note: Korean businessman who constructed the Majuro central building in 1991, where President Kabua once used its fifth floor as his office.) an economic adviser for President Amata Kabua, introduced Gil Ok Yun to Kabua.

The anthem was adopted in 1991. It replaced a previous national anthem, "Ij Io̧kwe Ļo̧k Aelōn̄ Eo Aō".

== Lyrics ==
Marshallese lyrics

Aelōn̄ eo ao ion lometo;
Einwot wut ko lōti ion dren elae;
Kin meram in Mekar jen ijo ilan̄;
Erreo an romak ioir kin meram in mour;

(𝄆) Eltan pein Anij eweleo im wōj;
Kejolit kij kin ijin jikir emol;
Ijjamin Ilok jen in aō lemoran;
Anij an ro jemem wonakke im kejrammon Aelin̄ kein ad. (𝄇)

IPA transcription (Note: See Help:IPA/Marshallese, Marshallese language § Orthography and Marshallese language § Phonology.)

[ɑe̯.lʲɪŋ e̯o ɑːɔ̯ i̯on lʲɔ.mʲɛ.dˠoː]
[ei̯nʲ.wɔtˠ wɯtˠ kʷɔ lʲɤ.dˠi i̯on rˠɛnʲ ɛ.lʲɑːɛ̯]
[kɪnʲ mʲɛ.rˠɑːmʲ inʲ mʲɛ.gɑːrˠ zʲɛnʲ i.zʲo i.lʲɑŋ]
[ɛr.rʲe̯o ɑnʲ rʷɔ.mʲɑg i̯o.ɨrˠ kɪnʲ mʲɛ.rˠɑːmʲ inʲ mʲou̯rˠ]

(𝄆) [ɛlˠ.dˠɑnʲ bʲei̯nʲ ɑ.nʲitʲ e.wɛː.lʲe̯ɔ imʲ wɤtʲ]
[kɛ.zʲo.lʲɪtˠ kɨzʲ kɪnʲ i.zʲinʲ tʲi.gɨrˠ ɛ.mʲɔːlʲ]
[iz.zʲɑ.mʲinʲ i.lʲɒkʷ zʲɛnʲ inʲ æ͡ɒ lʲɛ.mʲɔː.rˠænʲ]
[ɑ.nʲizʲ ɑnʲ rˠɔ zʲɛ.mʲɛmʲ wɔ.nʲɑg.gɛ imʲ gɛzʲ.rˠɑ.mʲɒnʲ ɑe.lʲɪŋ gei̯nʲ arʲ] (𝄇)

English lyrics

My island lies o'er the ocean;
Like a wreath of flowers upon the sea;
With the light of the Maker from far above;
Shining with the brilliance of rays of life;

(𝄆) Our Father's wondrous creation;
Bequeathed to us, our motherland;
I'll never leave my dear home sweet home;
God of our forefathers protect and bless forever Marshall Islands. (𝄇)
