= Knox Atoll =

Pacific Ocean atoll in the Marshall Islands

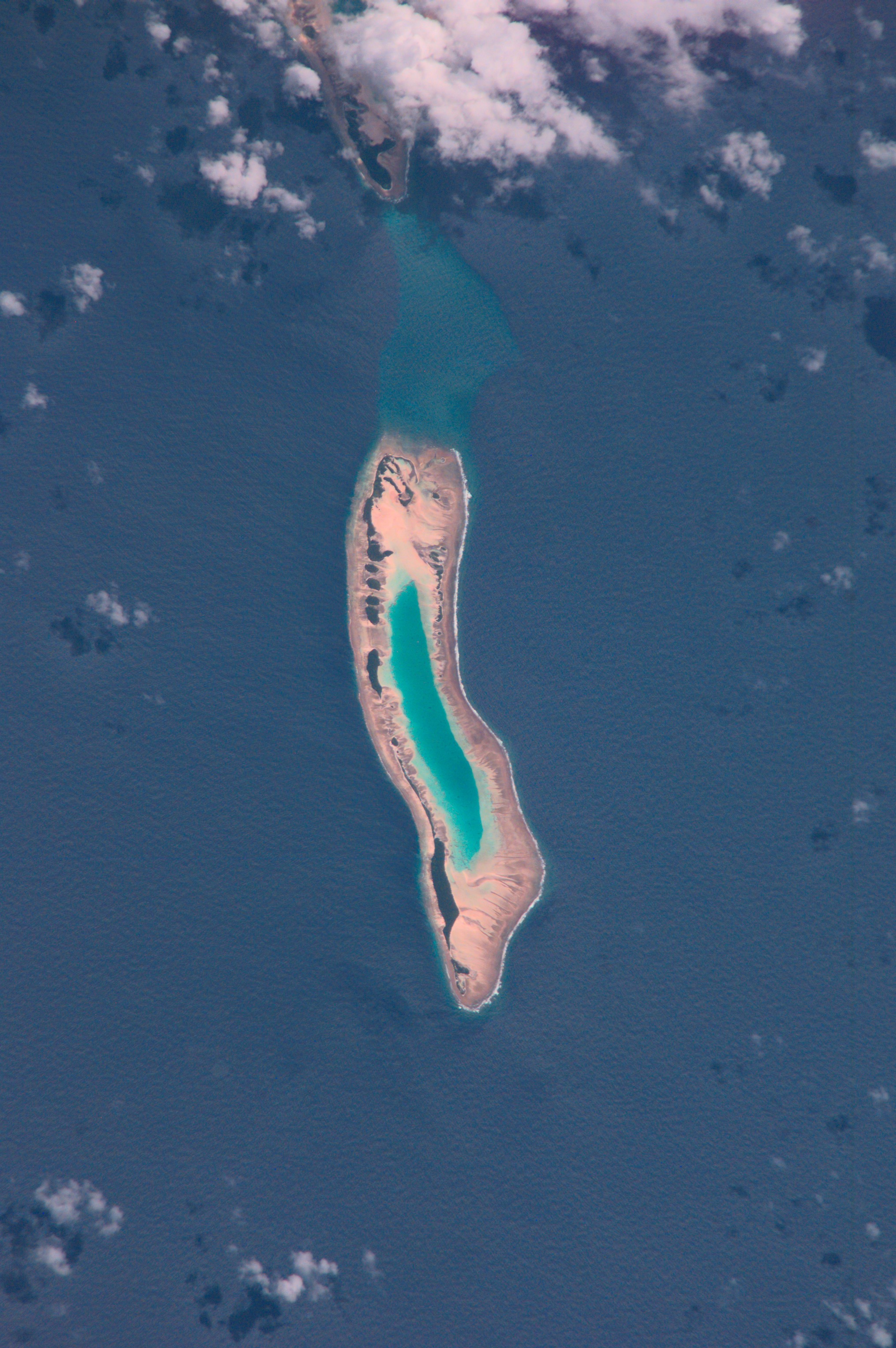
- NASA picture of Knox Atoll

- Location within Marshall Islands

Geography
- Location: North Pacific
- Coordinates: 05°54′00″N 172°09′00″E
- Archipelago: Ratak
- Total islands: 18
- Area: 0.98 km^{2} (0.38 sq mi)
- Highest elevation: 3 m (10 ft)

Administration
- Marshall Islands

Demographics
- Population: 0

Knox Atoll (Marshallese: Ņadikdik, [nˠɑːrʲiɡ(i)rʲik]) is an uninhabited coral atoll of 18 islands in the Pacific Ocean, and is the southernmost atoll of the Ratak Chain of the Marshall Islands. The total land area is only 0.98 square kilometers (0.38 sq mi), but it encloses a largely sand-filled lagoon with an area of 3.42 square kilometers (1.32 sq mi). The atoll measures 11 kilometers (6.8 mi) in length and is 2 kilometers (1.2 mi) wide. The largest islets, located on the western and northern sides, include Aelingeo, Nadikdik and Nariktal. The atoll is separated by the Klee Passage from the southern point of Mili Atoll to which it was once connected.

== History ==
Knox Atoll was claimed by the German Empire along with the rest of the Marshall Islands in 1885. After World War I, the island came under the South Seas Mandate of the Empire of Japan. Following the end of World War II, it came under the control of the United States as part of the Trust Territory of the Pacific Islands until the independence of the Marshall Islands in 1986.

=== 1905 Typhoon ===
On 30 June 1905, the atoll of Nadikdik was completely overwhelmed by a huge typhoon that washed away most of its landmass, stripping it down to the bare coral. Almost all of the some 60 inhabitants perished, save for two boys who survived a 24-hour drift voyage clinging on a breadfruit tree. The sediment generated by the storm and the coral it threw up on to the islands initiated natural ecological restoration that has since enabled them to regenerate. One island has become fully vegetated and stable, while several smaller islands have reappeared and formed into a single, larger landmass.

== See also ==
- Desert island
- List of islands
