= Law enforcement in the Marshall Islands =

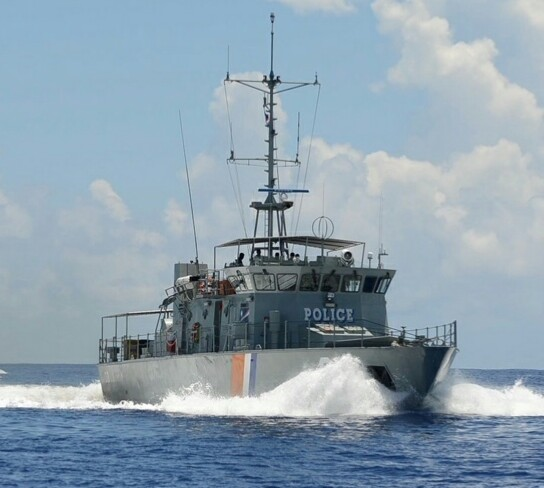
Marshall Islands Police Sea Patrol's RMIS Lomor

Defense of the Marshall Islands is the responsibility of the United States, but local police matters are handled by the Marshall Islands Police, the national police force, as well as several atoll or municipality-based departments.

== History ==
According to The U.S. Department of State,

"After gaining military control of the Marshall Islands from Japan in 1944, the United States assumed administrative control of the Marshall Islands under United Nations auspices as part of the Trust Territory of the Pacific Islands following the end of World War II."

The Marshall Islands became a small nation with Compact of Association with United States since the 1980s, and the Trust Territory System shutdown. Two other island nations in the Pacific have this arrangement. The exact security details are something that are worked out between the two.

Previously, the law enforcement activity on the U.S. military installation was the responsibility of government contractor Alutiiq, LLC, which operated as “Kwajalein Police Department”, a government-owned, contractor operated entity.

This operation transitioned to federal employees instead of the use of contractor-provided police officers under the administration of President Barack Obama, who directed federal agencies to review whether certain types of work should be reserved for federal employees as inherently governmental functions.

While the law enforcement role on Kwajalein has transitioned to Department of the Army civilian police officers, who are federal employees, Alutiiq still remains on Kwajalein, as the “Security and Access Control Contractor”, providing security guard patrols, Customs/TSA services, marine patrol, and explosives/narcotics detection canines.

== Organisation ==
There are two police forces which function under the name Kwajalein Police, a municipal department known otherwise as Kalgov Police, in addition to law enforcement on the U.S. military base on Kwajalein Atoll separate from the Government of the Marshall Islands, which is handled by the Department of the Army Civilian Police from the United States.

Marshall Islands police officer Clemson Jormelu is contingent commander of the Marshall Islands Police serving as part of RAMSI's Participating Police Force (PPF).

=== Overseas deployment ===
The Marshall Islands has provided police officers to the Regional Assistance Mission to Solomon Islands since May 2006.

== Events ==
In December 2020, Marshall Islands police found a 5.5-meter (18-foot) fibreglass boat at Ailuk Atoll with 649 kilograms (1,430 pounds) of cocaine worth an estimated US$80 million. This was the largest drug bust in Marshall Islands history,The shipment was destroyed, but other wash ups have become problem for the Marshall Islands, because it sometimes goes unreported. Those shipments can end up there because of the ocean currents.

As of 2021, Arkansas is allowing Marshalese citizens to serve in local law enforcement while they retain their Marshall Island citizenship; Arkansas is one of the most popular places for Marshall Islanders to live in the USA.

In 2024, Marshall Islands was growing concerned about the actions of people convicted of crimes in the United States that are then deported to the Marshall Islands.

== Criminal rates ==
Marshall Islands has struggled to deal with deportations, which come from the unique non-immigrant status of Marshalese in the United States; they are allowed to live and work in the USA through the Compact of Association, but can still be sent back to the Marshall Islands if they violate rules.

In the case of violent crime, the government in is concerned about the actions of criminals disrupting the communities on the atolls.
