= Jemo Island =

Uninhabited island in the Marshall Islands

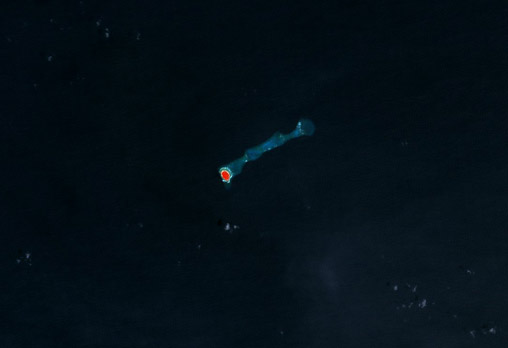
- NASA picture of Jemo Island

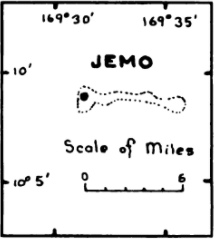
- Map of the island

- Location within Marshall Islands

Geography
- Location: North Pacific
- Coordinates: 10°07′N 169°33′E
- Archipelago: Ratak
- Total islands: 1
- Area: 0.16 km^{2} (0.062 sq mi)
- Highest elevation: 3 m (10 ft)

Administration
- Marshall Islands

Demographics
- Demonym: Jemian

Jemo Island Atoll (Marshallese: Jemo̧ or Jāmo̧, [tʲæːmʲɒ]) is an uninhabited coral island in the Pacific Ocean, in the Ratak Chain of the Marshall Islands north-east of Likiep Atoll. The island is oval-shaped and occupies the southwestern end of a narrow submarine ridge that extends to the northeast for several kilometers. Its total land area is only 0.16 square kilometers (0.062 sq mi). The island is traditionally held as a food reserve for the family of Joachim and Lijon deBrum, passed down to Lijon deBrum from Iroijlaplap Lobareo and is owned by the current Likiep land-owning families of Joachim and Lijon deBrum, grandkids of Iroijlaplap Jortõka of Ratak Eañ. There is also the shipwreck of the MV Marshall Islands cargo ship from 1979 on the west coast of the island.

The first recorded sighting of Jemo Island by Europeans was by the Spanish expedition of Miguel López de Legazpi on 10 January 1565. It was charted as Los Pajaros (The Birds in Spanish).

In 2025, rats were successfully eradicated from the atoll, with positive impacts on birdlife and reforestation noted shortly thereafter.

== See also ==
- Desert island
- List of islands
