= Ajeltake =

Coordinates: 7°05′03″N 171°08′02″E

Ajeltake ([ɑzʲeltˠɑɡe]) is a town in the Marshall Islands. It is located on Majuro Atoll and occupies the southwestern section of the Atoll ring. The population numbered 1,700 in 2006.
