= List of political parties in the Marshall Islands =

There are no legally incorporated political parties in the Marshall Islands, but there are unofficial groupings:

- Aelon̄ Kein Ad
- United Democratic Party
- United People's Party

== See also ==
- Politics of the Marshall Islands
- List of political parties by country
