= Transportation in the Marshall Islands =

Transportation in the Marshall Islands reflects the country’s geography as a low-lying archipelago of widely scattered atolls in the central Pacific Ocean. Transport infrastructure consists primarily of road networks on the main atolls, domestic and international air services, and maritime transport through ports and harbors. There are no railways. Sea and air travel are essential for movement between islands, with Majuro and Kwajalein serving as the principal transport hubs.

== Rail transport ==
There are no railways in the Marshall Islands.

== Road transport ==
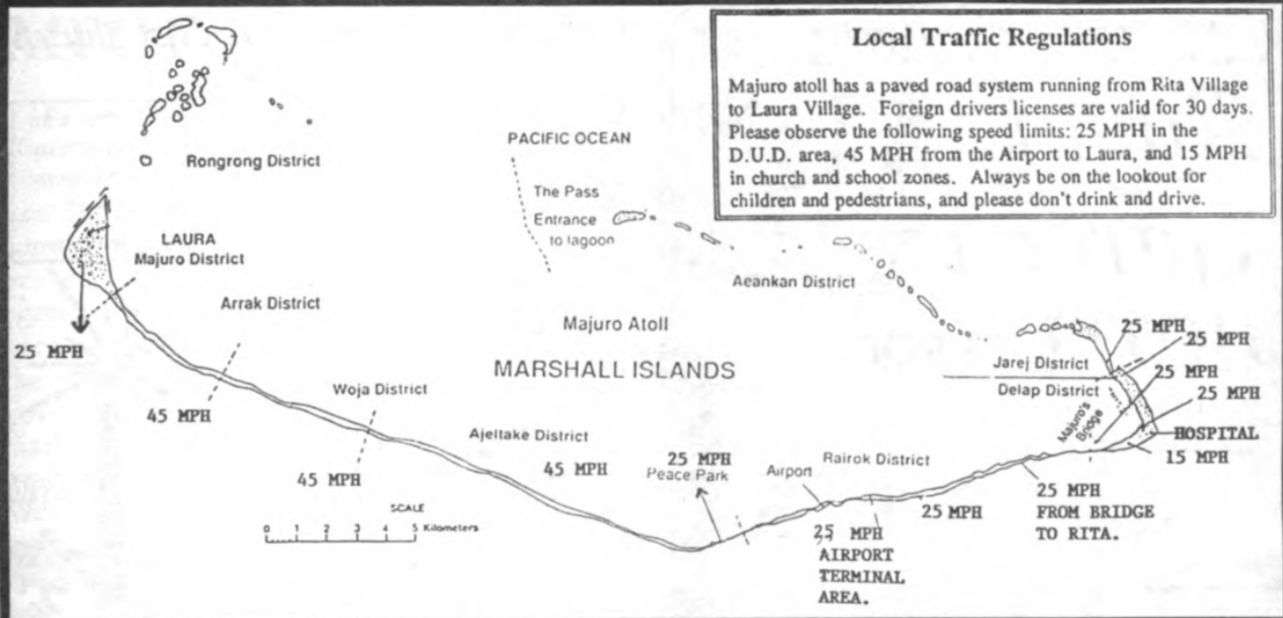
Road system on Majuro Atoll

Highways:
total:NA km
paved:64.5 km
unpaved:NA km
note: paved roads on major islands (Majuro, Kwajalein), otherwise stone-, coral-, or laterite-surfaced roads and tracks (2002)

Ports and harbors: Majuro

== Maritime transport ==
Merchant marine:
total: 342 ships (1,000 GT or over) totaling 14,471,690 GT/23,802,896 tonnes deadweight (DWT)
ships by type: bulk 86, cargo 18, chemical tanker 31, combination bulk 4, combination ore/oil 7, container 69, liquified gas 8, multi-functional large load carrier 1, passenger 6, petroleum tanker 106, roll on/roll off 1, short-sea passenger 1, vehicle carrier 1 (2002 est.)
note: a flag of convenience registry; includes the ships of People's Republic of China 1, Cyprus 1, Denmark 9, Germany 70, Greece 54, Hong Kong 2, Japan 4, Monaco 8, Netherlands 8, United Kingdom 3, United States 87, and Uruguay 1 (2002 est.)

== Air transport ==
Majuro’s Amata Kabua International Airport serves as the primary gateway for international flights to the Marshall Islands, with connections including United Airlines through Honolulu and Our Airline from Australia. For domestic travel, Air Marshall Islands operates weekly flights from Majuro to outer islands such as Bikini and other atolls, providing essential connectivity across the country’s scattered archipelago.

Airports:35 (2009), see list of airports in the Marshall Islands

Airports - with paved runways:
total: 5
1,524 to 2,437 m: 4 (Eniwetok, IATA airport code ENT; Kwajalein, KWA; and Marshall Islands International, MAJ; Rongelap, RNP).
914 to 1,523 m: 1 (2009)

Airports and airstrips - with unpaved runways:
total: 30
914 to 1,523 m: 29
under 914 m: 1 (2009)

== See also ==
- Marshall Islands
- Public Transportation
