= Ebeye Island =

Island in the Marshall Islands

Ebeye
Native name: Epjā
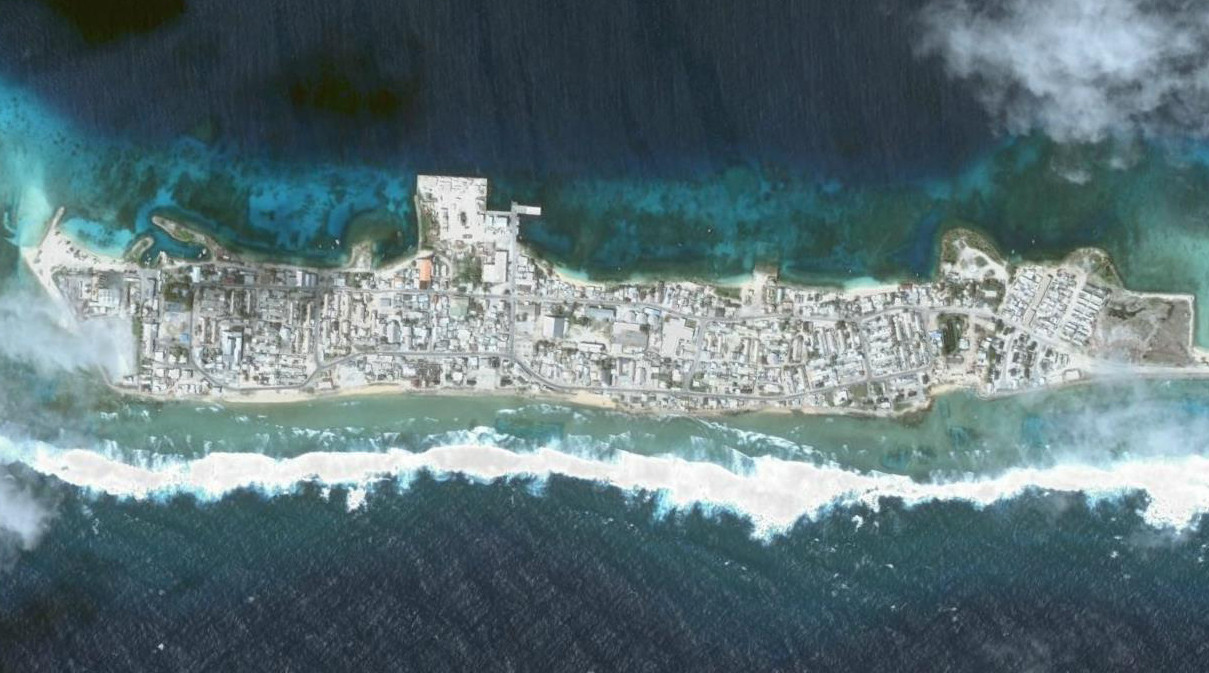

- Location within Marshall Islands

Geography
- Location: Kwajalein Atoll, Marshall Islands
- Coordinates: 8°46′49″N 167°44′14″E
- Adjacent to: Northern Pacific Ocean
- Area: 0.36 km^{2} (0.14 sq mi)

Administration
- Marshall Islands

Demographics
- Population: ~10,000 (2021)
- Ethnic groups: Marshalese

Ebeye (/ˈiːbaɪ/ EE-by; Marshallese: Epjā, or Ebeje in older orthography, [ɛbʲ(ɛ)zʲæ]; locally, Ibae, [ibˠɑːɛ], after the English pronunciation) is the most populous island of Kwajalein Atoll in the Marshall Islands, and the second most populated island in the Marshall Islands. It is a center for Marshallese culture in the Ralik Chain of the archipelago. Settled on 80 acres (32 hectares) of land, in 2021 it had a population of 8,416. Over 33% of residents have diabetes.

Ebeye is home to the RMI (Republic of the Marshall Islands) Emergency Operations Center and other facilities, including schools, health facilities, stores, and hotel, along with residential structures. It has some docks but no airstrip, but is connected by causeway to Loi, Shell, and Gugeegue islands to the north.

== History ==
Ebeye was an island of the Marshallese people; it was annexed in 1885 by the German Empire. In 1914 it became a mandate of the Empire of Japan. In 1944 it was captured by the United States during WW2, after Japan attacked the USA. After WW2, it was part of U.N. protectorate administered by the USA until 1979. The Marshall Islands maintains a compact of free association with United States to the present day. Ebeye is the closest location for those employed at the military base to the south, which coordinates many logistical and aid programs for the island. Ebeye was connected by causeway in 1992 to the islands to its north, so it is now physically connected to Loi, Shell and Gugeegue islands.

Aid projects have increased programs for schools, medical access, water, and sewage, but concern about over-topping waves has led to a seawall project in the 2020s.

=== Etymology ===
When Christian missionaries first arrived in the Marshall Islands, they introduced Latin script writing and orthographized the Marshallese language. Originally, Ebeye was written Ebeje by Europeans (Epjā in modern orthography, pronounced [ɛbʲ(ɛ)zʲæ]), which (according to elders of the atoll) means "making something out of nothing." However, the colonial German administration mispronounced the J as if it were German language [j], and foreign observers recorded the resulting pronunciation as Ebeye. During the Japanese period, though, the island's pronunciation in katakana, Ebize (エビゼ) [ebʲize], re-approximated Marshallese. After World War II, the Americans took possession of the regional mandate from Japan and mispronounced the island's name as /ˈiːbaɪ/ EE-by from its spelling. Because most of the modern Marshallese residents of Ebeye don't have historical roots on the island, the American pronunciation has stuck and is the usual name for Ebeye among the island's current population. This pronunciation has even been adapted to Marshallese orthography, so that there are now two synonymous Marshallese names for the island – officially and historically Epjā, and locally Ibae.

It was also called Burton Island by the USA, in what was called the Carillon atoll.

=== World War II ===
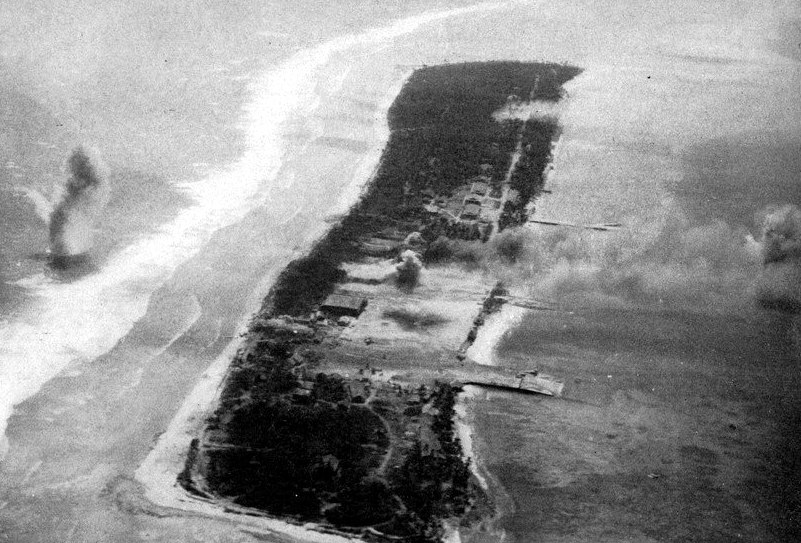
Ebeye island being shelled on 30 January 1944, prior to the Battle of Kwajalein later that year

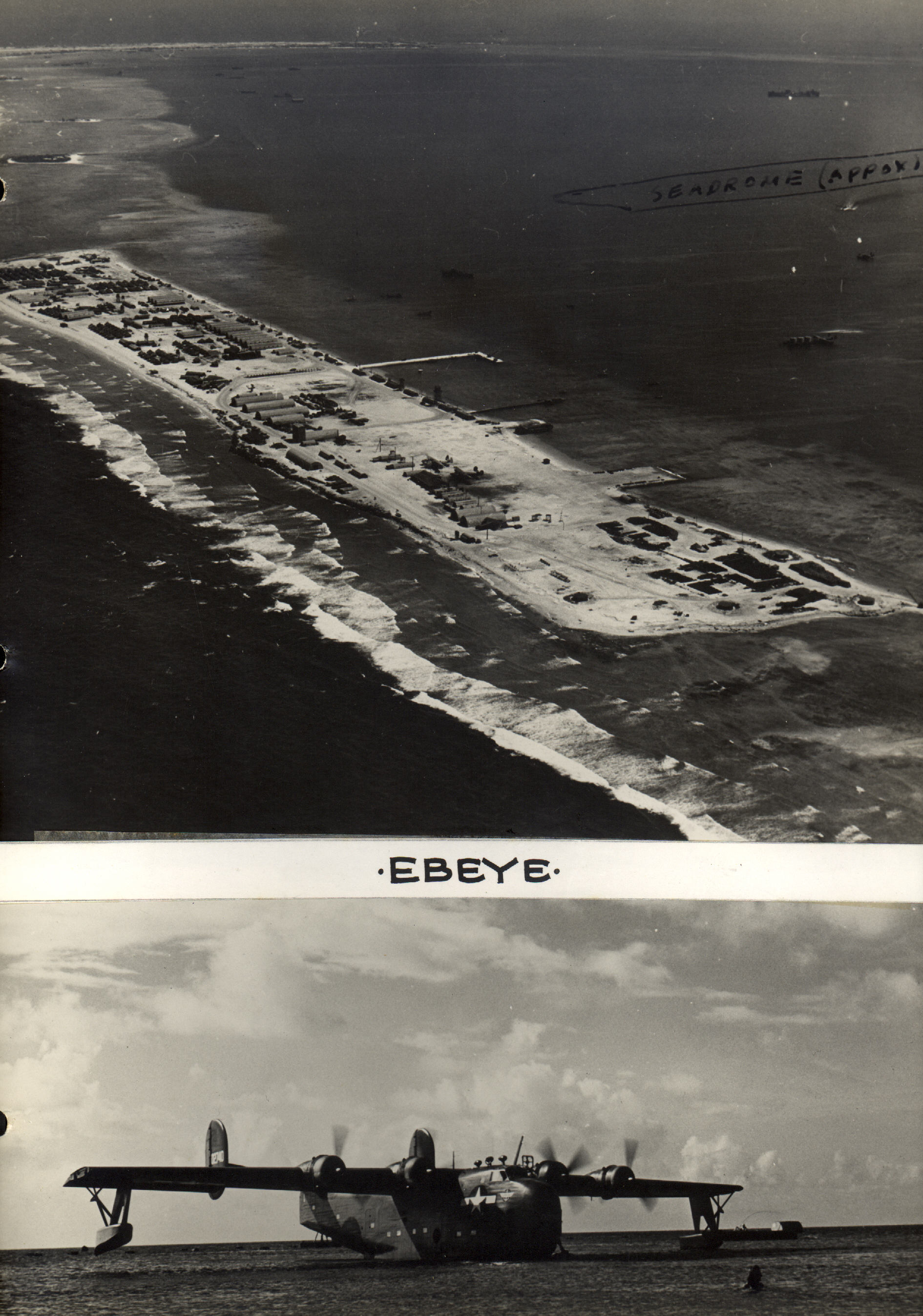
Ebeye Island seaplane base, 1945

The Imperial Japanese Navy constructed a seaplane base on Ebeye in the early 1940s. Following the Battle of Kwajalein from 31 January to 3 February 1944, Ebeye was occupied by US forces. On 7 March the 107th Naval Construction Battalion was sent to Ebeye to redevelop the seaplane base. The Seabees repaired the existing 1,600-by-30-foot (487.7 by 9.1 m) pier, adding a 50-by-240-foot (15 by 73 m) ell extension, and also repaired a 250-foot (76 m) Japanese H-shaped pier. The Seabees assembled a pontoon wharf and pontoon barges for transporting damaged carrier aircraft to repair units ashore. Further installations on Ebeye consisted of housing in floored tents and Quonset huts, a 150-bed dispensary, four magazines, 24,000 square feet (2,200 m^{2}) of covered storage, and a 4,000-US-barrel (480,000 L; 130,000 US gal; 100,000 imp gal) aviation-gasoline tank farm.

=== Forced immigration from the Mid-Atoll Corridor ===
Before the early 1950s, a large number of present-day residents of Ebeye lived on small islands throughout Kwajalein Atoll. When Kwajalein island started to be used as a support base for the nuclear tests conducted at Bikini Atoll and Enewetak Atoll, Marshallese residents of Kwajalein were relocated by U.S. authorities to a planned community on Ebeye with housing for half their number. Until then, Ebeye was largely unpopulated and had served as a Japanese seaplane base before the Pacific War.

In 1950, the US Navy constructed a LORAN station on Ebeye. It was disestablished in 1977.

With the advent of the Nike-Zeus anti-ballistic missile testing program of the 1960s, the U.S. military decided for safety and security reasons to evacuate slightly more than 100 residents of the central part of the atoll to create a zone where unarmed guided missiles could be targeted from the continental United States.

Subsequent population growth by migration from outlying rural atolls and islands throughout the Marshalls created a housing shortage and problems with resources throughout the following decades. Some of the original Ebeye inhabitants with land rights did not feel adequately compensated for the tenants who came to live on their land even though their paramount chief had worked with the Trust Territory to move them there.

=== 21st century ===
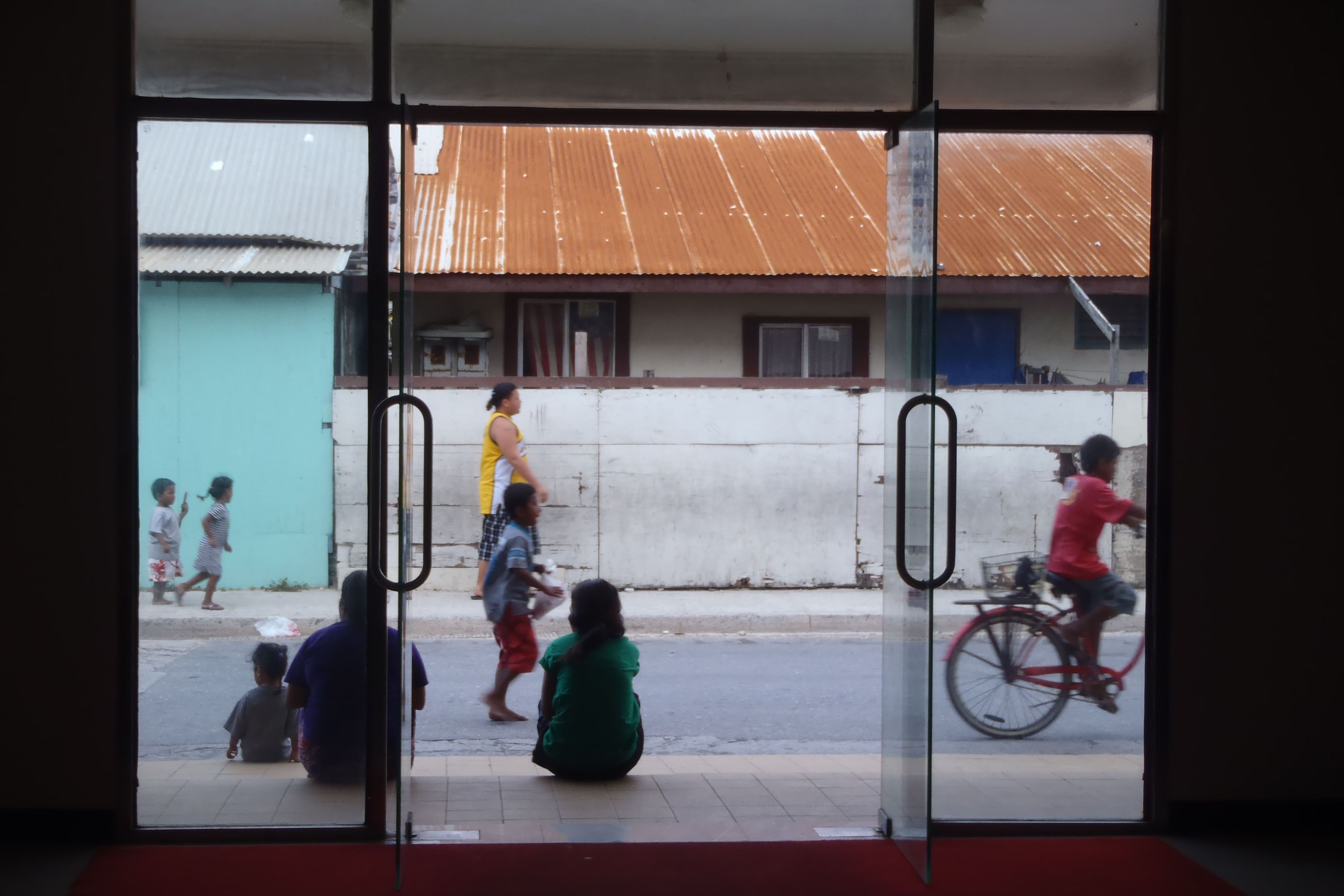
Street view of Ebeye, 2012

In 2010, 40,000 gallons of water had to be shipped to Ebeye when its water plant failed.

A new Emergency Operations Center for the RMI was opened in 2024 on Ebeye. The new 2-story building houses offices to coordinate disaster relief throughout the RMI.

In early 2024, the Marshall Islands were experiencing three months of drought, and in response international aid organization mobilized to bring some relief, such as extra water storage tanks.

In 2024, a plan was announced to build a protective seawall at Ebeye, to reduce erosion and help prevent inundation from waves that over top the island. The Marshall Islands periodically have issues with overtopping waves, which can damage infrastructure, cause injuries, and render ground water undrinkable.

There is also a plan in the late 2010s and 2020s to modernize waste management. Currently there is a large dump at the north end of Ebeye.

== Geography ==
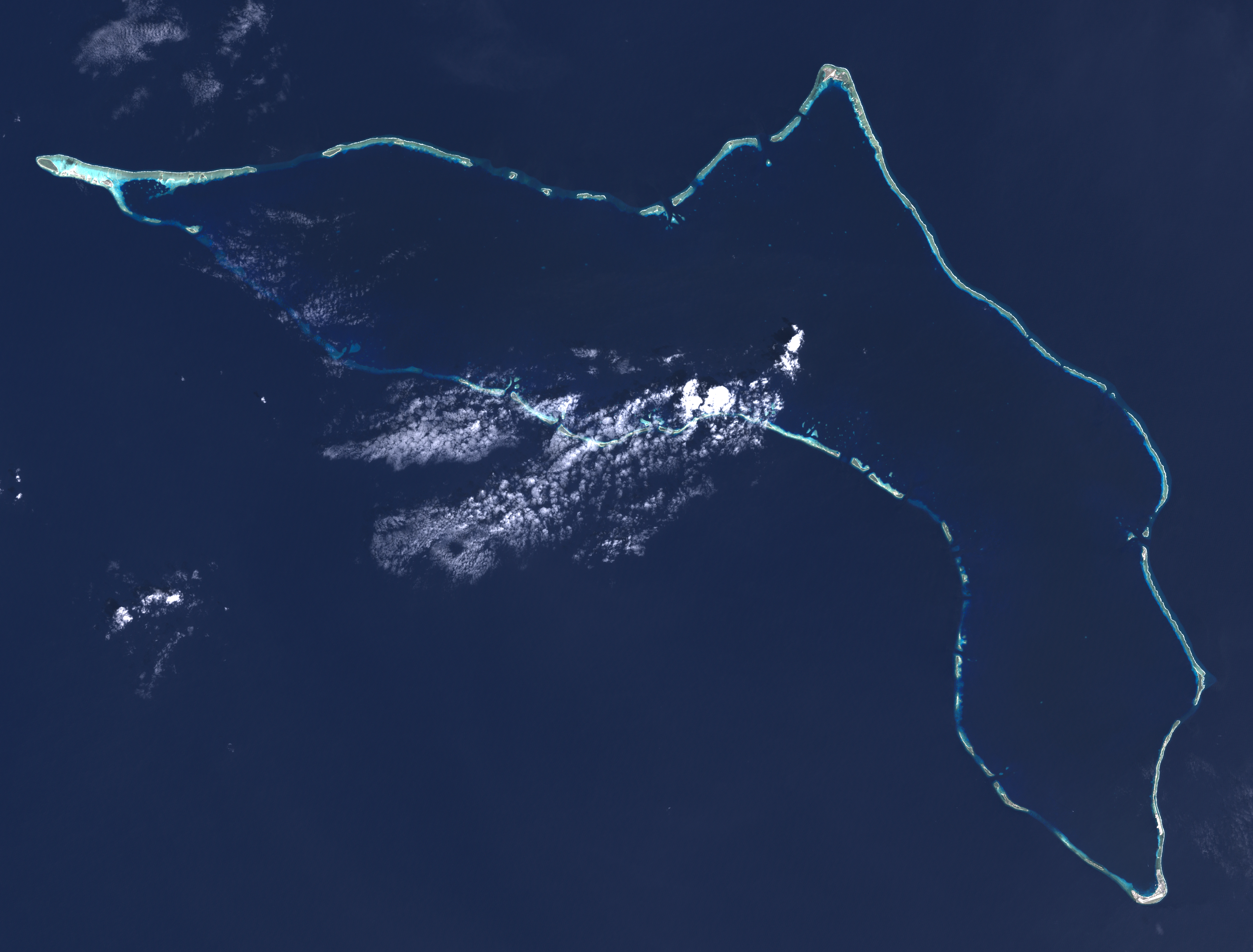
Kwajalein atoll, Ebeye is a narrow island in the South East

Ebeye is the most populous island of Kwajalein Atoll in the Marshall Islands, as well as the center for Marshallese culture in the Ralik Chain of the archipelago. It comprises 80 acres (32 ha).

Kwajalein is one of the largest coral atolls in the world, consisting of 97 main islands, of which Ebeye is one. However, they are only about 2 meters/yards or 6 feet above sea level on average.

Ebeye is about half way between Australia and the Hawaiian islands.

A road goes north to Loi, Shell, and Gugeegue atolls on causeways; it stops at Nene. Then there is Bigej channel and to the north is Bigej Island. The causeway connecting Ebeye to South and North Loi, Little Shell, Big Shell, and Gugeegue islands was completed in 1992. To the south is the main Kwajalein atoll island which has the airport and military base.

== Demographics ==
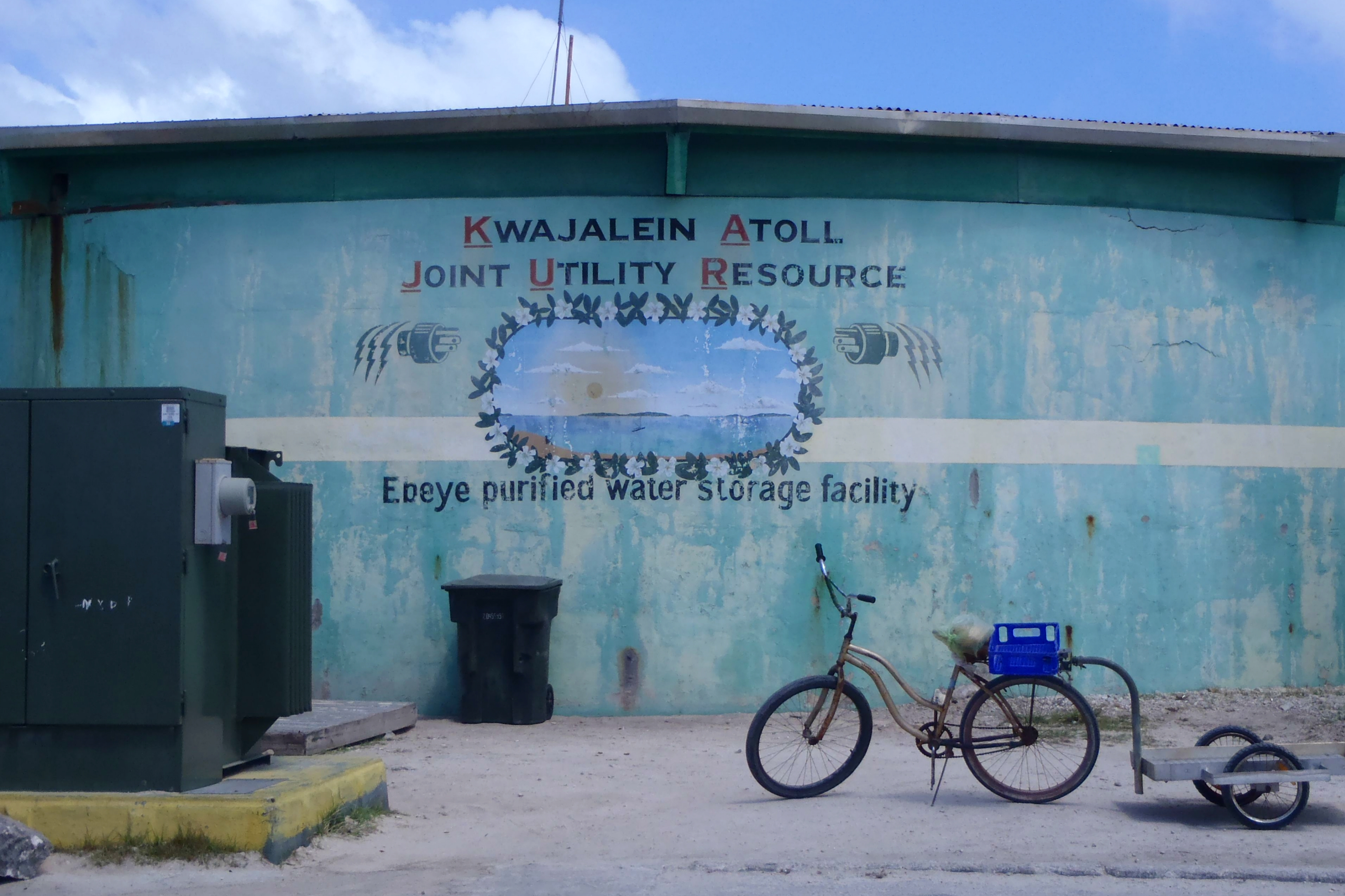
Ebeye water utility building. Keeping an adequate water supply on the atoll has been difficult at times due to droughts

Ebeye has a population of more than 15,000 (2011 est). In 2008, the population was 12,000. In 1968, the population was 3,000.

9,789 people lived on the Kwajalein including Ebeye in the 2021 census,

This is the second most populous island of the Marshall Islands, with Majuro being larger at about 25 thousand, as of the 2020s. These are much greater than the next populated islands at this time including Arno (~2 thousand), Jabor (~1200), and Wotje (~900).

Ebeye is famed for being one of the most densely populated small islands on Earth. It has ten times the population of nearby historical homeland Kwajalein island, but only one tenth of the area. It is the sixth most densely populated island in the world as of the early 21st century.

=== Refuge from nuclear fallout ===
Some of the residents of Ebeye are refugees or descendants of refugees from the effects of the 15-megaton Castle Bravo nuclear test at Bikini Atoll on 1 March 1954. The detonation unexpectedly rained nuclear fallout and two inches (50 mm) of radioactive snow on nearby Rongelap Atoll, which had not been evacuated as had Bikini. The 1954 American authorities then evacuated Rongelap and were returned in 1957 with extensive medical surveillance. In 1985, Greenpeace evacuated the inhabitants of Rongelap to Mejato (island in Kwajalein atoll). Ebeye was the final destination for many of them.

=== Health ===
Infant mortality on Ebeye is 3.0% as of 2006. There have been recurrent outbreaks of cholera, dengue fever, and tuberculosis. In 1963 there was a polio outbreak, and in 1978 a measles outbreak. In 2009, the Ebeye Community Health Center was awarded a grant as part of the United States Stimulus for monitoring influenza (e.g. H1N1).

Over 33% of the population has diabetes. It is the result of a severely limited access to fresh food, with residents being forced to subsist almost purely on highly processed foods shipped from the United States.

=== Potable water ===
Potable water for the population comes from a water purification system, and a rain-water catchment. In an emergency water has been shipped from the nearby military base to the south. In the late 2010s the USA and Australia cooperated on a plan to increase the amount of potable water, increase its purity, and also improve the sewage system.

== Economy ==
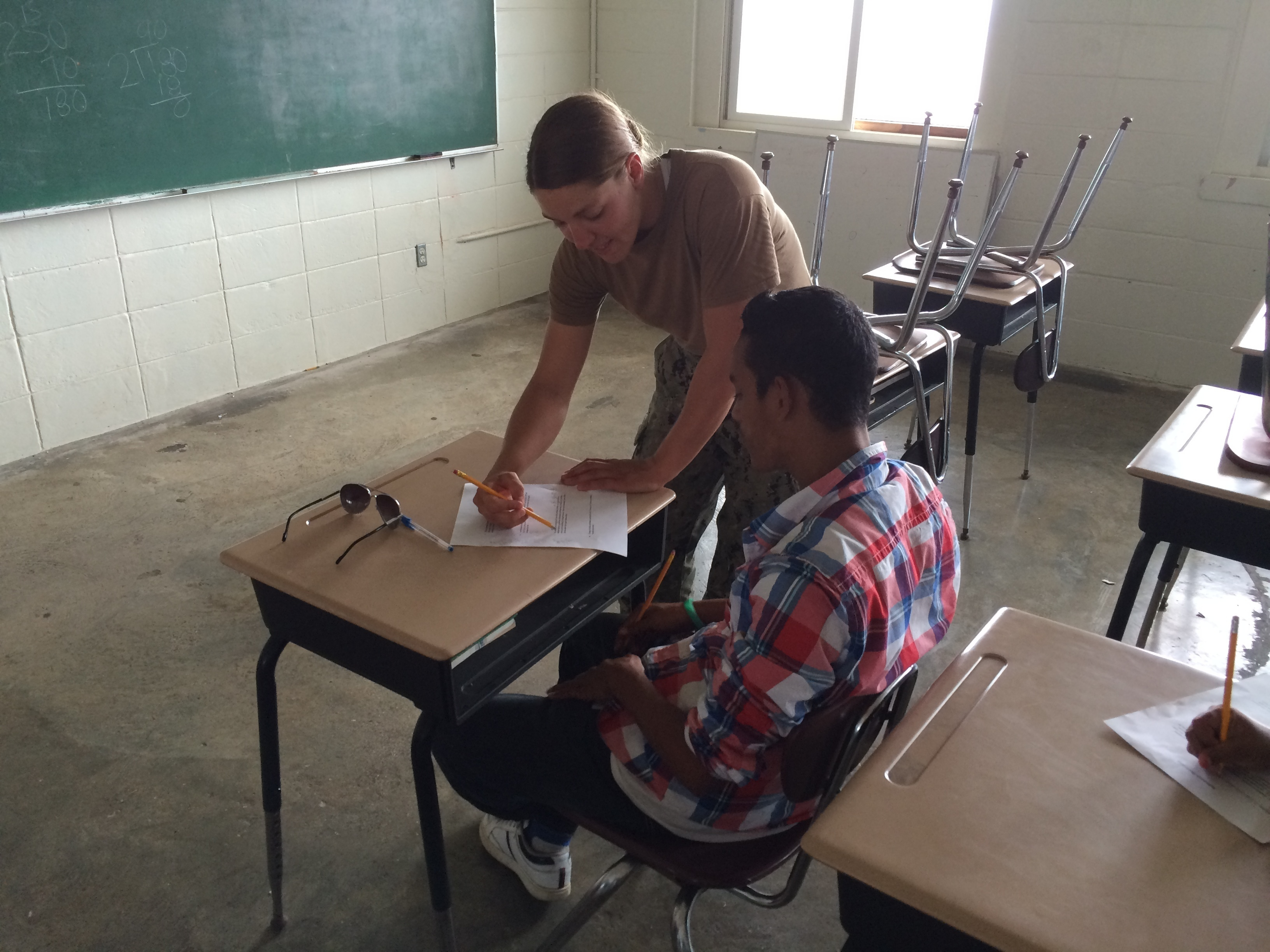
Navy sailor helps an Ebeye student with a math problem at school

The Marshall Islands subsists primarily upon foreign aid and lease payments from the United States for the military use of Kwajalein Atoll. The United States provides $1.5 billion in aid under the Compact of Free Association, spread out over the 20 years of the agreement, which expired in 2023. It was renewed for another 20 years after that by the RMI. Apart from this, handicrafts are produced and there is a small fishery. Some larger projects are funded through international aid organizations such as Red Cross or the U.N..

== See also ==
- Queen of Peace Church, Ebeye
- Pacific Partnership
- Malé, another highly populated small island, in the Indian Ocean
