= ISO 3166-2:MH =

Entry for the Marshall Islands in ISO 3166-2

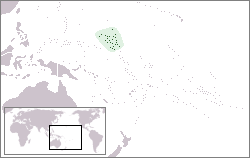
Location of islands

ISO 3166-2:MH is the entry for the Marshall Islands in ISO 3166-2, part of the ISO 3166 standard published by the International Organization for Standardization (ISO), which defines codes for the names of the principal subdivisions (e.g., provinces or states) of all countries coded in ISO 3166-1.

Currently for the Marshall Islands, ISO 3166-2 codes are defined for two levels of subdivisions:

- two chains (of islands) (i.e., the Ralik Chain and the Ratak Chain)
- 24 municipalities

The municipalities are inhabited atolls or islands. The ten uninhabited atolls and islands of the country are not listed:

- In Ralik Chain: Ailinginae Atoll, Bikini Atoll, Rongerik Atoll, and Ujelang Atoll (previously inhabited and had its code deleted in Newsletter II-1)
- In Ratak Chain: Bikar Atoll, Bokak Atoll, Erikub Atoll, Jemo Island, Nadikdik Atoll, and Toke Atoll

Each code consists of two parts separated by a hyphen. The first part is MH, the ISO 3166-1 alpha-2 code of the Marshall Islands. The second part is either of the following:

- one letter: chains (of islands)
- three letters: municipalities

== Current codes ==
Subdivision names are listed as in the ISO 3166-2 standard published by the ISO 3166 Maintenance Agency (ISO 3166/MA).

Click on the button in the header to sort each column.

=== Chains (of islands) ===
Code	Subdivision name (en)	Subdivision name (mh)
MH-L	Ralik chain	Ralik chain
MH-T	Ratak chain	Ratak chain

=== Municipalities ===
Code	Subdivision name (en)	Subdivision name (mh)	In chain (of islands)
MH-ALL	Ailinglaplap	Aelōn̄ḷapḷap	L
MH-ALK	Ailuk	Aelok	T
MH-ARN	Arno	Arṇo	T
MH-AUR	Aur	Aur	T
MH-KIL	Bikini & Kili	Pikinni & Kōle	L
MH-EBO	Ebon	Epoon	L
MH-ENI	Enewetak & Ujelang	Ānewetak & Wūjlan̄	L
MH-JAB	Jabat	Jebat	L
MH-JAL	Jaluit	Jālwōj	L
MH-KWA	Kwajalein	Kuwajleen	L
MH-LAE	Lae	Lae	L
MH-LIB	Lib	Ellep	L
MH-LIK	Likiep	Likiep	T
MH-MAJ	Majuro	Mājro	T
MH-MAL	Maloelap	Ṃaḷoeḷap	T
MH-MEJ	Mejit	Mājej	T
MH-MIL	Mili	Mile	T
MH-NMK	Namdrik	Naṃdik	L
MH-NMU	Namu	Naṃo	L
MH-RON	Rongelap	Ron̄ḷap	L
MH-UJA	Ujae	Ujae	L
MH-UTI	Utrik	Utrōk	T
MH-WTH	Wotho	Wōtto	L
MH-WTJ	Wotje	Wōjjā	T

== Changes ==
The following changes to the entry have been announced in newsletters by the ISO 3166/MA since the first publication of ISO 3166-2 in 1998:

Newsletter	Date issued	Description of change in newsletter	Code/Subdivision change
Newsletter II-1	2010-02-03 (corrected 2010-02-19)	Addition of the country code prefix as the first code element, addition of names in administrative languages	Subdivisions added: MH-JAB Jabat; Subdivisions deleted: MH-UJL Ujelang

== See also ==
- Subdivisions of the Marshall Islands
