= List of islands of the Marshall Islands =

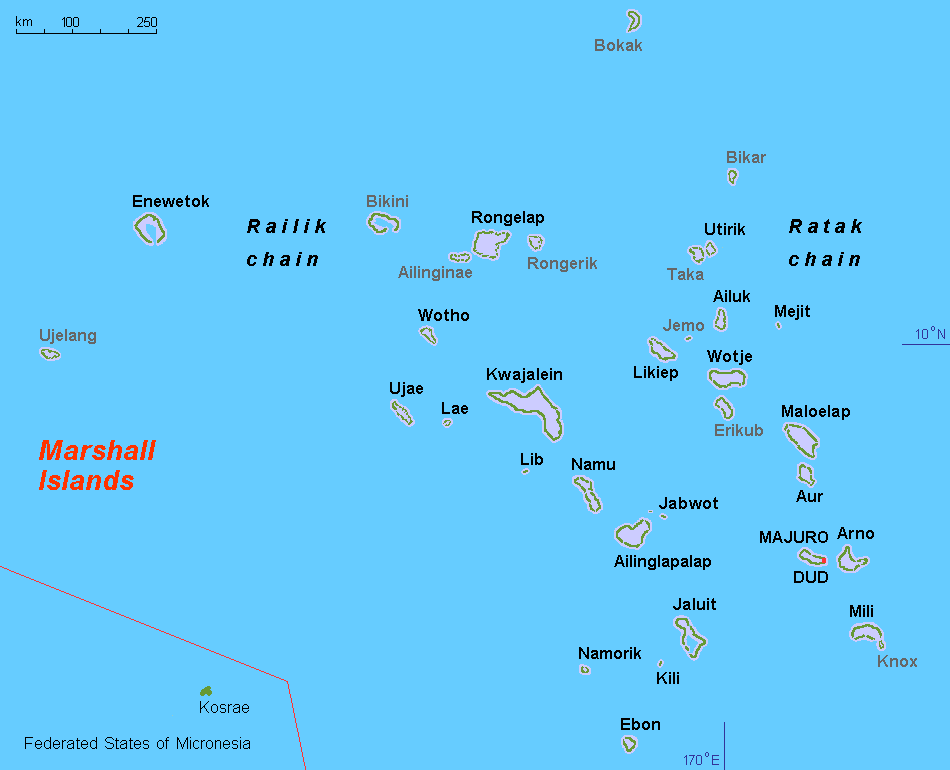
Islands and atolls of the Marshall Islands. Uninhabited ones are labeled in grey.

Population distribution in the 2010s

The Republic of Marshall Islands consists of 6 atolls (each made up of many islets) and 5 islands, which can be divided into two island chains, Ralik Chain and Ratak Chain.

== Inhabited municipalities ==
Administratively, the country is divided into 24 inhabited municipalities, corresponding to the 24 inhabited atolls or islands, where each of them is an electoral district.

Municipality	Chain	Population (2021)	Area (km^{2})	Area (mi^{2})
Ailinglaplap Atoll	Ralik	1,175	15	6
Ailuk Atoll	Ratak	235	5	2
Arno Atoll	Ratak	1,141	13	5
Aur Atoll	Ratak	317	6	2
Ebon Atoll	Ralik	469	6	2
Enewetok / Ujelang	Ralik	296	6	2
Jabat Island	Ralik	75	1	0
Jaluit Atoll	Ralik	1,409	11	4
Kili / Bikini / Ejit	Ralik	415	1	0
Kwajalein Atoll	Ralik	9,789	16	6
Lae Atoll	Ralik	133	1	1
Lib Island	Ralik	156	1	0
Likiep Atoll	Ratak	288	10	4
Majuro (capital)	Ratak	23,156	10	4
Maloelap Atoll	Ratak	395	10	4
Mejit Island	Ratak	230	2	1
Mili Atoll	Ratak	497	16	6
Namorik Atoll	Ralik	299	3	1
Namu Atoll	Ralik	525	6	2
Rongelap Atoll (Note: Since 1985, most of the Rongelapese community lives on the Mejatto Island of Kwajalein Atoll, due to radioactive contamination of their atoll.)	Ralik	0	8	3
Ujae Atoll	Ralik	310	2	1
Utirik Atoll	Ratak	264	2	1
Wotho Atoll	Ralik	88	4	2
Wotje Atoll	Ratak	816	8	3

== Uninhabited atolls/islands ==
The remaining 11 atolls/islands are currently uninhabited. According to the Constitution of the Republic of the Marshall Islands, the uninhabited atolls/islands Narikrik, Erikub, Jemo, Taka, Bikar, Bokak, Rongrik and Ailinginae shall each be included in the electoral district with which it is most closely associated, pursuant to the customary law or any traditional practice. Ujelang is listed with the Enewetak & Ujelang District, and Bikini with the Bikini & Kili District.

Atoll/Island	Chain	Area (km^{2})	Area (mi^{2})
Ailinginae Atoll (Note: Ailinginae Atoll and Rongerik Atoll traditionally belong to Rongelap Atoll)	Ralik	3	1
Bikar Atoll	Ratak	0.69	0.27
Bikini Atoll	Ralik	6	2
Bokak Atoll	Ratak	3	1
Erikub Atoll (Note: Erikub Atoll belongs to the people of Wotja Atoll)	Ratak	2	1
Jemo Island (Note: Jemo Island belongs to the owners of Likiep Atoll (see there))	Ratak	0.21	0.08
Nadikdik Atoll	Ratak	1	0
Rongerik Atoll	Ralik	2	1
Toke Atoll (Note: Toke Atoll belongs to the people of Utirik Atoll)	Ratak	0.57	0.22
Ujelang Atoll	Ralik	2	1
Wake Atoll (Note: Wake Atoll is disputed with the US)	Ratak	7	3

== See also ==
- ISO 3166-2:MH
