= Elections in the Marshall Islands =

The Marshall Islands elects on the national level a unicameral legislature. The legislature, known as the Nitijela, is composed of 33 members elected for four-year terms by first-past-the-post voting. They in turn elect a president, who is both the head of state and head of government, also for four years. The current president is Hilda Heine. Elections are held every four years; the most recent took place on 20 November 2023, and the next is scheduled for 2027.

== Nitijela ==
There are 33 members of the Nitijela from 24 constituencies, 19 of which are represented by single members (number of members in parentheses if multiple):

- Ailinglaplap Atoll (2)
- Ailuk Atoll
- Arno Atoll (2)
- Aur Atoll
- Ebon Atoll
- Enewetak Atoll
- Jabat Island
- Jaluit Atoll (2)
- Kili Island / Bikini Atoll
- Kwajalein Atoll (3)
- Lae Atoll
- Lib Island
- Likiep Atoll
- Majuro (5)
- Maloelap Atoll
- Mejit Island
- Mili Atoll
- Namdrik Atoll
- Namu Atoll
- Rongelap Atoll
- Ujae Atoll
- Utirik Atoll
- Wotho Atoll
- Wotje Atoll

The members are elected by universal suffrage, with the minimum voting age being 18. The members themselves must be at least 21 years old.

The most recent Marshallese general election took place on 20 November 2023, resulting in a high turnover of legislators as well as a record number (4) of female politicians elected to the legislature. Mail-in ballots may be received up to 14 days after the election date.

== President ==
The president is the head of state and head of government, and is elected by the Nitijela for a term of four years. Amata Kabua was elected as the first president of the Republic in 1979 and was elected to five consecutive terms, dying in office. In 2016, Hilda Heine became the first woman president of the Marshall Islands and the first woman to lead an independent Pacific nation. She was re-elected to a second, non-consecutive term in 2023 and is the current president.

== See also ==
- Government of the Marshall Islands
- List of political parties in the Marshall Islands
