= List of political and geographic subdivisions by total area under 50 square kilometers =

This is one of a series of comprehensive lists of continents, countries, and first level administrative country subdivisions such as states, provinces, and territories, as well as certain political and geographic features of substantial area. References for the information provided in this table may be found in the individual articles on each body listed herein. Some divisions are listed twice, with one listing including territory that is excluded in the other for various reasons, including territorial disputes. There is intentional overlap among the lists in order to maximize ease of use.

Geographic entity	Area (km^{2})	Notes
Sodražica	49.5	Municipality of Slovenia.
United States Minor Outlying Islands	49.26	Statistical designation of groups of islands controlled by the United States in the Pacific Ocean.
Bouvet Island	49	Norway Antarctica Territory Islands.
Kungota	49	Municipality of Slovenia.
Šentrupert	49	Municipality of Slovenia.
Žiri	49	Municipality of Slovenia.
Barceloneta	48.41	Municipality of Puerto Rico.
(Niue) Hakupu	48.04	Village of Niue.
Mirna Peč	48	Municipality of Slovenia.
Alo	47.5	Chiefdom of Wallis and Futuna.
Escaldes-Engordany	47	Parish of Andorra.
Ngatpang	47	State of Palau.
(Niue) Alofi North	46.48	Village of Niue.
(Niue) Alofi South	46.48	Village of Niue.
Križevci	46.2	Municipality of Slovenia.
Bournemouth	46	Unitary authority of England.
(Montenegro) Tivat	46	Municipality of Montenegro.
Ventspils	46	Second smallest city of Latvia with separate status (not part of any district).
Podlehnik	46	Municipality of Slovenia.
Saint Paul Parish	45.27	Third largest parish of Antigua and Barbuda.
Guantanamo Bay	45	Island of Cuba under United States control.
Prince Edward Island	45	Sub-antarctic territory of South Africa.
Harrisonburg	44.91	Independent City of Virginia.
Saint David Parish	44	Third largest parish of Grenada.
Airai	44	State of Palau.
Piran	44	Municipality of Slovenia.
Saint George	44	Third largest parish of Barbados.
Vieux Fort	43.77	District of Saint Lucia.
Nazarje	43.4	Municipality of Slovenia.
Škofljica	43.3	Municipality of Slovenia.
Luton	43	Unitary authority of England.
Grenadines Parish	43	Parish of Saint Vincent and the Grenadines.
(North Macedonia) Kisela Voda	43	Municipality of North Macedonia.
Nukulaelae (Total area)	43	Atoll and administrative district of Tuvalu.
City of Manila	42.88	Capital city of the Philippines.
Žirovnica	42.6	Municipality of Slovenia.
Borovnica	42.3	Municipality of Slovenia.
Southend-on-Sea	42	Unitary authority of England.
Saint Patrick Parish	42	Parish of Grenada.
(Niue) Liku	41.64	Village of Niue.
Prebold	41	Municipality of Slovenia.
Saint Philip Parish	40.67	Parish of Antigua and Barbuda.
Šenčur	40.3	Municipality of Slovenia.
Rogašovci	40.1	Municipality of Slovenia.
Ngchesar	40	State of Palau.
Reading	40	Unitary authority of England.
Portsmouth	40	Unitary authority (city) of England.
Duplek	40	Municipality of Slovenia.
Poquoson	39.77	Independent City of Virginia.
Rogatec	39.6	Municipality of Slovenia.
Southern	39.4	District in Hong Kong
Florida	39.39	Municipality of Puerto Rico.
Saint Michael	39	Parish of Barbados.
Arroyo	38.87	Municipality of Puerto Rico.
Muta	38.8	Municipality of Slovenia.
Tišina	38.8	Municipality of Slovenia.
Waynesboro	38.77	Independent City of Virginia.
Alexandria	38.68	Independent City of Virginia.
Anegada	38.6	Second largest district of the British Virgin Islands.
Scattered Islands in the Indian Ocean	38.6	Smallest district of the French Southern and Antarctic Lands.
Sveti Tomaž	38.09	Municipality of Slovenia.
(North Macedonia) Aračinovo	38	Municipality of North Macedonia.
Žetale	38	Municipality of Slovenia.
Laborie	38	District of Saint Lucia.
Carriacou and Petite Martinique	37.7	Dependency of Grenada.
Salem	37.6	Independent City of Virginia.
Poljčane	37.5	Municipality of Slovenia.
Grad	37.4	Municipality of Slovenia.
Sveta Ana	37.2	Municipality of Slovenia.
Rincón	37.01	Municpality of Puerto Rico.
Basel-Stadt	37	Smallest canton of Switzerland.
Saint Patrick Parish	37	Second smallest parish of Saint Vincent and the Grenadines.
Makole	36.9	Municipality of Slovenia.
Juršinci	36.3	Municipality of Slovenia.
South Eastern Region	36.2	Region of Malta.
Osilnica	36.2	Municipality of Slovenia.
Norfolk Island	36	Self-governing area of Australia.
Saint Andrew	36	Parish of Barbados.
Saint Lucy	36	Parish of Barbados.
Blackpool	35	Third smallest unitary authority of England.
Saint John Parish	35	Second smallest parish of Grenada.
(North Macedonia) Vevčani	35	Municipality of North Macedonia.
Tabor	34.8	Municipality of Slovenia.
Destrnik	34.4	Municipality of Slovenia.
Radenci	34.1	Municipality of Slovenia.
Sint Maarten	34	Dutch Territory.
Polzela	34	Municipality of Slovenia.
Starše	34	Municipality of Slovenia.
Sveti Jurij v Slovenskih Goricah	34	Municipality of Slovenia.
Šmarješke Toplice	34	Municipality of Slovenia.
Ngaraard	34	State of Palau.
Saint John	34	Tied for third smallest parish of Barbados.
Saint Peter	34	Tied for third smallest parish of Barbados.
Črenšovci	33.7	Municipality of Slovenia.
Bristol	33.34	Independent City of Virginia.
Dol pri Ljubljani	33.3	Municipality of Slovenia.
Oplotnica	33.2	Municipality of Slovenia.
Spanish possessions in North Africa	33	Possessions of Spain in North Africa.
Središče ob Dravi	32.7	Municipality of Slovenia.
Saint Peter Parish	32.6	Third smallest parish of Dominica.
Horjul	32.5	Municipality of Slovenia.
Saint Peter Parish	32.37	Second smallest parish of Antigua and Barbuda.
Cirkulane	32.07	Municipality of Slovenia.
Lakshadweep	32	Smallest union territory of India.
Saint James Windward Parish	32	Largest parish of Saint Kitts and Nevis.
Dobrna	31.7	Municipality of Slovenia.
Vodice	31.4	Municipality of Slovenia.
Mirna	31.3	Municipality of Slovenia.
Bistrica ob Sotli	31.1	Municipality of Slovenia.
Dobrovnik	31.1	Municipality of Slovenia.
Anse la Raye	31	Second smallest district of Saint Lucia.
Choiseul	31	Second smallest district of Saint Lucia.
Kalawao County	31	County of Hawaii.
Saint James	31	Second smallest parish of Barbados.
Cankova	30.6	Municipality of Slovenia.
Rečica ob Savinji	30.1	Municipality of Slovenia.
Culebra	30.1	Municipality of Puerto Rico.
Markovci	29.8	Municipality of Slovenia.
Triesenberg	29.8	Largest municipality of Liechtenstein.
Renče-Vogrsko	29.5	Municipality of Slovenia.
Hormigueros	29.37	Municipality of Puerto Rico.
Saint Andrew Parish	29	Smallest parish of Saint Vincent and the Grenadines.
Straža	29	Municipality of Slovenia.
Saint George Basseterre Parish	29	Second largest parish of Saint Kitts and Nevis.
Macau	28.6	Special administrative region of the People's Republic of China.
Izola	28.6	Municipality of Slovenia.
Dornava	28.4	Municipality of Slovenia.
Martinsville	28.37	Independent City of Virginia.
Naklo	28.3	Municipality of Slovenia.
Štore	28.1	Municipality of Slovenia.
(Cook Islands) Avarua	28	A district and town of the Cook Islands.
Fredericksburg	27.07	Independent City of Virginia.
Slough	27	Second smallest unitary authority of England.
Hopewell	26.82	Independent City of Virginia.
Schaan	26.8	Second largest municipality of Liechtenstein.
Charlottesville	26.55	Independent City of Virginia.
Triesen	26.4	Third largest municipality of Liechtenstein.
Mežica	26.4	Municipality of Slovenia.
(Niue) Mutalau	26.31	Village of Niue.
Sveta Trojica v Slovenskih Goricah	26.3	Municipality of Slovenia.
Pakri Islands	26.18	Islands part of Estonia.
Ngiwal	26	State of Palau.
Saint Joseph	26	Smallest parish of Barbados.
Tuvalu	26	Country in Oceania.
Manassas	25.49	Independent City of Virginia.
Radford	25.06	Independent City of Virginia.
Saint Mark Parish	25	Smallest parish of Grenada.
Saint John Capisterre Parish	25	Parish of Saint Kitts and Nevis.
Saint George Parish	24.41	Smallest parish of Antigua and Barbuda.
Benedikt	24.1	Municipality of Slovenia.
Komenda	24	Municipality of Slovenia.
Point Fortin	23.88	Second largest municipality of Trinidad and Tobago.
Winchester	23.81	Independent City of Virginia.
Turnišče	23.8	Municipality of Slovenia.
Little Sisters	23.7	Third largest district of the British Virgin Islands.
Central Region	23.6	Region of Malta.
Kwai Tsing	23.34	District in Hong Kong
Williamsburg	23.15	Independent City of Virginia.
Cerkvenjak	23	Municipality of Slovenia.
Trnovska Vas	22.9	Municipality of Slovenia.
Kuzma	22.9	Municipality of Slovenia.
Mengeš	22.5	Municipality of Slovenia.
Peleliu	22.3	State of Palau.
Honiara	22	Capital territory of the Solomon Islands.
Saint John Figtree Parish	22	Parish of Saint Kitts and Nevis.
Nanumea (total area)	22	Atoll and administrative district of Tuvalu.
Kingston Parish	21.8	Smallest parish of Jamaica. The parish of Kingston does not encompass all of the city of Kingston, most of which is in the parish of St. Andrew.
Hajdina	21.6	Municipality of Slovenia.
(Niue) Lakepa	21.58	Village of Niue.
Franklin	21.44	Independent City of Virginia.
Galax	21.33	Independent City of Virginia.
Virgin Gorda	21.2	Second smallest district of the British Virgin Islands.
(North Macedonia) Karpoš	21	Municipality of North Macedonia.
Nauru	21	Country in Oceania. Smallest republic in the world. Smallest independent Commonwealth state.
Saint Barthélemy	21	Overseas collectivity of France.
Saint Peter Basseterre Parish	21	Parish of Saint Kitts and Nevis.
Sint Eustatius	21	Special municipality of the Kingdom of the Netherlands.
(North Macedonia) Aerodrom	20	Municipality of North Macedonia.
(Malawi) Likoma	20	District of Malawi.
Kobilje	19.7	Municipality of Slovenia.
Balzers	19.6	Municipality of Liechtenstein.
Colonial Heights	19.48	Independent City of Virginia.
Norton	19.37	Independent City of Virginia.
Zavrč	19.3	Municipality of Slovenia.
Velika Polana	18.7	Municipality of Slovenia.
San Fernando City Corporation	18.64	Municipality of Trinidad and Tobago.
Šmartno ob Paki	18.2	Municipality of Slovenia.
Eastern	18.13	District in Hong Kong
Hodoš	18.1	Municipality of Slovenia.
Christ Church Nichola Town Parish	18	Parish of Saint Kitts and Nevis.
Saint George Gingerland Parish	18	Parish of Saint Kitts and Nevis.
Saint Thomas Lowland Parish	18	Parish of Saint Kitts and Nevis.
Emporia	17.88	Independent City of Virginia.
Sveti Andraž v Slovenskih Goricah	17.6	Municipality of Slovenia.
Grand Turk	17.6	Second smallest administrative district of the Turks and Caicos Islands.
Dobje	17.5	Municipality of Slovenia.
Vaduz	17.3	Municipality of Liechtenstein.
(Niue) Makefu	17.13	Village of Niue.
(Equatorial Guinea) Annobón	17	Province of Equatorial Guinea.
Rēzekne	17	Smallest city of Latvia with separate status (not part of any district).
Nui (Total area)	17	Atoll and administrative district of Tuvalu.
Sigave	16.75	Smallest chiefdom of Wallis and Futuna.
Buena Vista	16.67	Independent City of Virginia.
Água Grande	16.5	Smallest district of São Tomé and Príncipe.
Fairfax	16.16	Independent City of Virginia.
Isles of Scilly	16.03	Smallest unitary authority of England.
Trinity Palmetto Point Parish	16	Parish of Saint Kitts and Nevis.
Canaries	16	Smallest district of Saint Lucia.
Saint Mary Cayon Parish	15	Parish of Saint Kitts and Nevis.
Saint Ouen Parish	15	Largest parish of Jersey.
Ailinglaplap Atoll	15	Atoll and administrative district of Marshall Islands.
Kwajalein Atoll	15	Atoll and administrative district of Marshall Islands.
Mili Atoll	15	Atoll and administrative district of Marshall Islands.
Šempeter-Vrtojba	15	Municipality of Slovenia.
Covington	14.16	Independent City of Virginia.
Cocos (Keeling) Islands	14	An Australian external territory in the Indian Ocean.
Saint Paul Capisterre Parish	14	Parish of Saint Kitts and Nevis.
(Niue) Avatele	13.99	Village of Niue.
Wake Island	13.8	An atoll claimed by the Marshall Islands but administrated by the United States of America.
Saint Mark Parish	13.5	Second smallest parish of Dominica.
Port of Spain	13.45	Second smallest municipality of Trinidad and Tobago.
Saba	13	Special municipality of the Kingdom of the Netherlands.
Saint Anne Sandy Point Parish	13	Second smallest parish of Saint Kitts and Nevis.
Arno Atoll	13	Atoll and administrative district of Marshall Islands.
Saint Brélade Parish	12.8	Second largest parish of Jersey.
Central and Western	12.55	District in Hong Kong
Cataño	12.55	Municipality of Puerto Rico.
(Niue) Tuapa	12.54	Village of Niue.
Miklavž na Dravskem Polju	12.5	Municipality of Slovenia.
Trinity Parish	12.3	Third largest parish of Jersey.
Veržej	12	Municipality of Slovenia.
Andorra la Vella	12	Smallest parish of Andorra.
(Niue) Tamakautoga	11.93	Village of Niue.
Palmyra Atoll	11.9	An atoll which is a territory of the United States of America.
Saint Peter Parish	11.6	Parish of Jersey.
Kwun Tong	11.28	District in Hong Kong
Arima	11.15	Smallest municipality of Trinidad and Tobago.
Melekeok	11	State of Palau.
Log-Dragomer	11	Municipality of Slovenia.
Jaluit Atoll	11	Atoll and administrative district of Marshall Islands.
Tokelau	10.8	Territory of New Zealand.
Saint Luke Parish	10.8	Smallest parish of Dominica.
Wan Chai	10.64	District in Hong Kong
Saint Helier Parish	10.6	Parish of Jersey.
Serravalle (San Marino)	10.53	Largest municipality of San Marino.
Eschen	10.3	Municipality of Liechtenstein.
Saint Martin Parish	10.3	Parish of Jersey.
Castel Parish	10.2	Largest parish of Guernsey.
(Niue) Hikutavake	10.17	Village of Niue.
Kowloon City	10.02	District in Hong Kong
Ngarchelong	10	State of Palau.
Vaitupu	10	Atoll and administrative district of Tuvalu.
Likiep Atoll	10	Atoll and administrative district of Marshall Islands.
Majuro Atoll	10	Atoll and administrative district of Marshall Islands.
Maloelap Atoll	10	Atoll and administrative district of Marshall Islands.
Razkrižje	9.8	Municipality of Slovenia.
Saint Lawrence Parish	9.5	Parish of Jersey.
Sham Shui Po	9.36	District in Hong Kong
Saint Saviour Parish	9.3	Parish of Jersey.
Wong Tai Sin	9.3	District in Hong Kong
Salt Cay	9.1	Smallest administrative district of the Turks and Caicos Islands.
Borgo Maggiore	9.01	Second largest municipality of San Marino.
Šarengrad	9	An island in the Danube, Disputed between Croatia and Serbia
Vale Parish	8.9	Second largest parish of Guernsey.
Saint John Parish	8.7	Parish of Jersey.
Trzin	8.6	Municipality of Slovenia.
Yeouido	8.4	An island in Seoul, South Korea.
Jost Van Dyke	8.3	Smallest district of the British Virgin Islands.
Ankaran	8	Municipality of Slovenia.
Angaur	8	State of Palau.
Rongelap Atoll	8	Atoll and administrative district of Marshall Islands.
Wotje Atoll	8	Atoll and administrative district of Marshall Islands.
Manassas Park	7.86	Independent City of Virginia.
Grouville Parish	7.8	Third smallest parish of Jersey.
Faetano	7.75	Third largest municipality of San Marino.
Paracel Islands	7.75	Disputed islands in the South China Sea.
Coloane	7.6	One of the two largest parishes of Macau.
Taipa	7.6	One of the two largest parishes of Macau.
(North Macedonia) Centar	7.52	Municipality of North Macedonia.
Mauren	7.5	Municipality of Liechtenstein.
(North Macedonia) Šuto Orizari	7.48	Municipality of North Macedonia.
Ruggell	7.38	Municipality of Liechtenstein.
Saint Martin Parish	7.3	Third largest parish of Guernsey.
City of San Marino	7.09	Municipality of San Marino.
Glorioso Islands	7	Scattered islands in the Indian Ocean, part of the French Southern and Antarctic Lands.
Liberland	7	An island disputed between Croatia and Serbia. It is an unclaimed territory.
Pinnacle Islands	7	Group of uninhabited islands in the East China Sea, disputed by Japan, the People's Republic of China and the Republic of China.
Ostrov Tatyshev	7	An island in the city of Krasnoyarsk, Russia.
Yau Tsim Mong	6.99	District in Hong Kong
Odranci	6.9	Municipality of Slovenia.
Gibraltar	6.8	British Overseas Territory.
Domagnano	6.62	Municipality of San Marino.
St. George's Parish, Bermuda	6.6	Largest parish of Bermuda.
Fiorentino	6.57	Municipality of San Marino.
Lexington	6.54	Independent City of Virginia.
Saint Mary Parish	6.5	Second smallest parish of Jersey.
Saint Peter Port Parish	6.5	Parish of Guernsey.
Saint Saviour Parish	6.4	Parish of Guernsey.
Midway Islands	6.2	Minor outlying island of the United States.
Saint Peter Parish	6.2	Parish of Guernsey.
Gamprin	6.1	Third smallest municipality of Liechtenstein.
Saint Sampson Parish	6	Parish of Guernsey.
Aur Atoll	6	Atoll and administrative district of Marshall Islands.
Ebon Atoll	6	Atoll and administrative district of Marshall Islands.
Enewetak Atoll	6	Atoll and administrative district of Marshall Islands.
Namu Atoll	6	Atoll and administrative district of Marshall Islands.
Clipperton Island	6	Only minor overseas territory of France.
Devonshire Parish	5.97	Tied for smallest parish of Bermuda.
Hamilton Parish	5.97	Tied for smallest parish of Bermuda.
Paget Parish	5.97	Tied for smallest parish of Bermuda.
Pembroke Parish	5.97	Tied for smallest parish of Bermuda.
Sandys Parish	5.97	Tied for smallest parish of Bermuda.
Smith's Parish	5.97	Tied for smallest parish of Bermuda.
Southampton Parish	5.97	Tied for smallest parish of Bermuda.
Warwick Parish	5.97	Tied for smallest parish of Bermuda.
Chiesanuova	5.46	Third smallest municipality of San Marino.
Navassa Island	5.4	An island administrated by the United States but claimed by Haiti.
(Niue) Vaiea	5.4	Village of Niue.
Falls Church	5.3	Independent City in Virginia.
Planken	5.3	Second smallest municipality of Liechtenstein.
Ashmore and Cartier Islands	5	External territory of Australia.
Sedudu Island	5	An island in the Chobe River.
Spratly Islands	5	Disputed islands in the South China Sea.
Ailuk Atoll	5	Atoll and administrative district of Marshall Islands.
Acquaviva	4.86	Second smallest municipality of San Marino.
Ada Bojana	4.81	An Island in the Ulcinj Municipality, Montenegro.
(Niue) Toi	4.77	Village of Niue.
Jarvis Island	4.5	An island which is a territory of the United States of America.
Saint Andrew Parish	4.4	Third smallest parish of Guernsey.
Hayden Island	4.4	An Island in the Columbia River Between Vancouver, WA and Portland, OR.
Forest Parish	4.2	Second smallest parish of Guernsey.
Saint Clement Parish	4.2	Smallest parish of Jersey.
Saint Paul Charlestown Parish	4	Smallest parish of Saint Kitts and Nevis.
Wotho Atoll	4	Atoll and administrative district of Marshall Islands.
Nanumea (Land area only)	3.87	Atoll and administrative district of Tuvalu.
(North Macedonia) Čair	3.52	Municipality of North Macedonia.
Neutral Moresnet	3.5	Former neutral territory between Belgium, the Netherlands, and Germany. Existed between 1816 and 1920.
Schellenberg	3.5	Smallest municipality of Liechtenstein.
Sé, Macau	3.4	Third largest parish of Macau.
Nui (Land area only)	3.37	Atoll and administrative district of Tuvalu.
Isla de Aves	3.36	Island of the Federal Dependencies of Venezuela.
Montegiardino	3.31	Smallest municipality of San Marino.
Nossa Senhora de Fátima, Macau	3.2	Parish of Macau.
Sonsorol	3.12	Third smallest state of Palau.
Anibare District	3.1	One of the two largest districts of Nauru.
Meneng District	3.1	One of the two largest districts of Nauru.
Torteval Parish	3.1	Smallest parish of Guernsey.
Namorik Atoll	3	Atoll and administrative district of Marshall Islands.
Coral Sea Islands	3	External territory of Australia.
Nukufetau (Land area only)	2.99	Atoll and administrative district of Tuvalu.
City of London	2.9	Smallest county (or equivalent) in the United Kingdom.
Nanjido	2.8	An island in Seoul, South Korea.
Johnston Atoll	2.67	An island which is a territory of the United States of America.
Buada District	2.6	Third largest district of Nauru.
Howland Island	2.6	An island which is a territory of the United States of America.
Ostrov Otdykha	2.5	An island in the city of Krasnoyarsk, Russia.
Swains Island	2.43	Island of American Samoa.
Baker Island	2.1	An island which is a territory of the United States of America.
Monaco	2.02	Country in Europe; smallest French speaking country.
Ujae Atoll	2	Atoll and administrative district of Marshall Islands.
Utirik Atoll	2	Atoll and administrative district of Marshall Islands.
Nibok District	1.6	District of Nauru.
Redonda	1.6	Dependency of Antigua and Barbuda.
Anabar District	1.5	District of Nauru.
Yaren District	1.5	District of Nauru.
Wheeling Island	1.5	An Island in the Ohio River in West Virginia.
(Niue) Namukulu	1.48	Village of Niue.
Kayangel	1.4	Second smallest state of Palau.
Rŭngrado	1.3	An island in Pyongyang, North Korea.
Baitsi District	1.2	District of Nauru.
Ewa District	1.2	District of Nauru.
Yanggakdo	1.2	An island in Pyongyang, North Korea.
Santo António, Macau	1.1	Third smallest parish of Macau.
Ijuw District	1.1	District of Nauru.
Aiwo District	1.1	District of Nauru.
Anetan District	1	District of Nauru.
São Lourenço, Macau	1	Second smallest parish of Macau.
St. George's, Bermuda	1	Estimate; largest municipality of Bermuda.
Lae Atoll	1	Atoll and administrative district of Marshall Islands.
Denigomodu District	0.9	Third smallest district of Nauru.
Uaboe District	0.8	Second smallest district of Nauru.
Rockall	0.784	An uninhabitable islet in the North Atlantic Ocean.
Hamilton, Bermuda	0.7	Smallest municipality of Bermuda.
Nakanoshima	0.7	An island in the Kyu-Yodo River in Osaka.
Zhenbao Island	0.7	An island in the Ussuri River.
São Lázaro	0.64	Smallest parish of Macau.
Monte-Carlo	0.61	Largest commune of Monaco.
Bhavani Island	0.53	An island in the Krishna River.
Boe District	0.5	Smallest district of Nauru.
Vatican City	0.44	Country in Europe; smallest country in the world.
Larvotto	0.337	Second largest commune of Monaco.
Fontvieille	0.335	Third largest commune of Monaco.
Just Room Enough Island	0.31	The smallest inhabited island in the world, also known as the Hub Island, it is located in New York, United States.
Little Saint James	0.3	An island in the US Virgin Islands.
La Condamine	0.295	Commune of Monaco.
Bamseom	0.24	An island in the Han River.
Île de la Cité	0.2	An island in Central Paris, France.
Nakasu	0.2	An island in the Nakagawa River.
Prince's Island Park	0.2	An island in Bow River.
Monaco-Ville	0.196	Commune of Monaco.
La Rousse	0.177	Commune of Monaco.
La Colle	0.176	Commune of Monaco.
Hatfield Island	0.17	An island in the Guyandotte River.
Saint Michel	0.142	Third smallest commune of Monaco.
Moneghetti	0.104	Second smallest commune of Monaco.
Les Révoires	0.076	Smallest commune of Monaco.
Liberty Island	0.06	Federally-owned island in New York City.
Rose Atoll	0.05	Atoll within the American Samoa.
Vukovar	0.032	A disputed Danube Island between Croatia and Serbia.
Kingman Reef	0.03	A submerged reef which is a territory of the United States of America.
Ravin de Sainte-Dévote	0.0234	Smallest ward of Monaco and smallest first level administrative subdivision in the world.
Umananda Island	0.02	An island in the Brahmaputra River.
São João Baptista de Ajudá	0.02	Portuguese colony de facto part of Benin; no formal annexation treaty.
Sovereign Military Order of Malta	0.013	Sovereign entity of international law; Palazzo Malta and Villa Malta, within (but not part of) Rome.
Sebitseom	0.0104	A set of Islands in the Han River in Seoul, South Korea.
Pheasant Island	0.00682	An island disputed between France and Spain.
Republic of Molossia	0.0045	A Micronation located near Dayton, Nevada.
Principality of Sealand	0.004	A Micronation that claims Roughs Tower.

== See also ==
Other divisions

- 0.1 to 1,000,000+ square kilometers
- 1,000,000+ square kilometers

Smaller divisions

- 200,000+ square kilometers • 100,000 to 1,000,000 square kilometers • 50,000 to 200,000 square kilometers • 20,000 to 50,000 square kilometers
- 5,000 to 20,000 square kilometers • 1,000 to 5,000 square kilometers • 0.1 to 1,000 square kilometers
- 500,000 to 1,000,000 square kilometers • 200,000 to 500,000 square kilometers • 100,000 to 200,000 square kilometers
- 50,000 to 100,000 square kilometers • 30,000 to 50,000 square kilometers • 20,000 to 30,000 square kilometers • 10,000 to 20,000 square kilometers
- 7,000 to 10,000 square kilometers • 5,000 to 7,000 square kilometers • 3,000 to 5,000 square kilometers • 1,000 to 3,000 square kilometers
- 250 to 1,000 square kilometers • 50 to 250 square kilometers • Under 50 square kilometers

Other

- List of countries and dependencies by area
- List of largest empires
- List of administrative divisions by country
- Category:Ranked lists of country subdivisions
