= USS Richland (AK-207) =

Cargo ship of the United States Navy

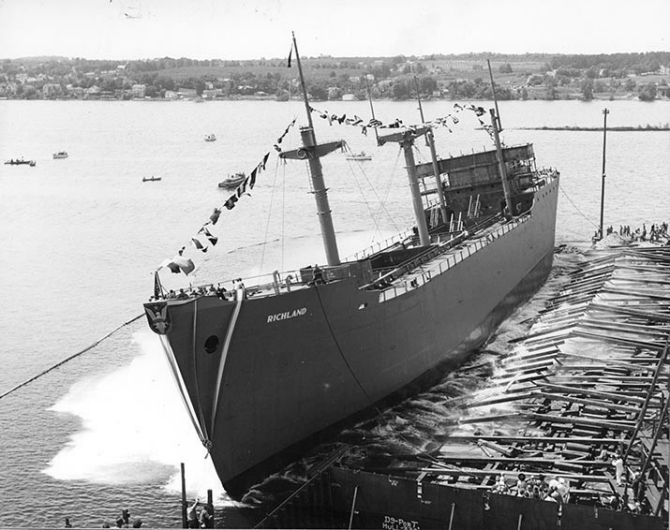
- Reflecting the side-launching practice dictated by shipbuilding on inland waterways, Richland, her name in white block letters on her bow, enters her element on 5 August 1944, while the christening party watches her progress from the platform at lower right and spectators afloat and ashore look on.

History

United States
- Name: Richland
- Namesake: Richland County, Ohio, Richland County, Illinois, Richland County, Montana, Richland County, North Dakota, Richland County, South Carolina, and; Richland County, Wisconsin
- Ordered: as type (C1-M-AV1) hull, MC hull 2161
- Builder: Leathem D. Smith Shipbuilding Company, Sturgeon Bay, Wisconsin
- Yard number: 327
- Laid down: 15 January 1944
- Launched: 5 August 1944
- Sponsored by: Mrs. Warren G. Brown
- Acquired: 17 April 1945
- Commissioned: 22 April 1945
- Decommissioned: 23 January 1946
- Stricken: 7 February 1946
- Identification: Hull symbol: AK-207; Code letters: NXNP
- Fate: Sold for scrapping 15 December 1971, to Pyramid Ventures Group, Inc., delivered 12 January 1972

General characteristics
- Class & type: Alamosa-class cargo ship
- Type: C1-M-AV1
- Tonnage: 5,032 long tons deadweight (DWT)
- Displacement: 2,382 long tons (2,420 t) (standard); 7,450 long tons (7,570 t) (full load)
- Length: 388 ft 8 in (118.47 m)
- Beam: 50 ft (15 m)
- Draft: 21 ft 1 in (6.43 m)
- Installed power: 1 × Nordberg, TSM 6 diesel engine; 1,750 shp (1,300 kW)
- Propulsion: 1 × propeller
- Speed: 11.5 kn (21.3 km/h; 13.2 mph)
- Capacity: 3,945 t (3,883 long tons) DWT; 9,830 cu ft (278 m^{3}) (refrigerated); 227,730 cu ft (6,449 m^{3}) (non-refrigerated)
- Complement: 15 Officers; 70 Enlisted
- Armament: 1 × 3 in (76 mm)/50 caliber dual purpose gun (DP); 6 × 20 mm (0.8 in) Oerlikon anti-aircraft (AA) cannons

USS Richland (AK-207) was an Alamosa-class cargo ship that was constructed for the US Navy during the closing period of World War II. She served in the Pacific Ocean theatre of operations and returned home in 1946, where she was placed into the reserve "mothball" fleet until scrapped in 1972.

== Construction ==
The first ship to be so named by the navy, Richland, built under US Maritime Commission (MARCOM) contract, MC hull 2161, was laid down 15 January 1944, by Leathem D. Smith Shipbuilding Company, Sturgeon Bay, Wisconsin; launched 5 August 1944; sponsored by Mrs. Warren G. Brown. Richland completed her sea trials off Chicago, Illinois, on 8 November 1944. Acquired from MARCOM on a loan-charter basis 17 April 1945, at Port Houston Iron Works, Texas, Richland underwent concurrent completion and conversion, with the final work being performed at Brown's Shipyard, Houston, where she was commissioned on 22 April 1945.

== Service history ==
=== Transit the Panama Canal ===
Following shakedown, and after what her commanding officer called an "uneventful cruise" to Gulfport, Mississippi, Richland loaded cargo, steel for the construction of 40 two-story huts and a 'tween deck cargo of 5-inch (127 mm)/38 caliber gun and 40 mm Bofors gun mounts, at the Naval Supply Depot, Gulfport. She completed the loading process mid-way through the first watch on 2 June 1945, then stood out to sea mid-way through the first dog watch the following day. She made landfall off Cape San Antonio, Cuba, during the morning watch on the 6th, then continued on for Panama for onward routing. She began "bucking a fairly heavy sea" the following day, then encountered squally weather on the 8th. Although Richland's commanding officer noted that the ship was "taking [the rough weather] nicely," he observed candidly: "Not enough ship for the money, not enough power for the ship and about crew enough for a one shore based desk. All hands and the ship's cook getting sea sick and each casualty leaves one detail with two men on a twenty four hour basis."

Richland reached Coco Solo, Canal Zone (C.Z.), at 0800 on 10 June 1945, standing in at daylight, mooring alongside Pier 1-C, and reported to Commander in Chief, US Pacific Fleet, for duty. The following day, 11 June, with a local pilot embarked, the ship transited the Panama Canal, sailing on orders from the Port Director, Balboa, C.Z., to proceed to Leyte Gulf, in the Philippine Islands, and there report to Commander, Seventh Fleet, for duty with Service Squadron (ServRon) Nine.

=== Pacific Theater duty ===
As Richland sailed toward the Philippines, her war diary noted her course, with her commanding officer interjecting comments on the ship's routine. Lt. Hills lectured his crew on "battle and blackout security," on 15 June 1945; three days later, he wrote of Richland's starboard side 20 mm guns using a 3-inch (76 mm) burst as a target, and that drills that day concerned "battle damage and gun stripping, cleaning, and repairing." On 20 June, Richland conducted "extensive fire and G.Q. [general quarters] drills including firing of port side 20 mm guns on burst from 3-inch. Three – 3-inch bursts "on target"." That same day, the commanding officer wrote approvingly: "Lt. Robert H. Boulware, USNR, has developed into an exceptional navigator." Battle practice on 22 June found the ship shooting well, with a boatswain's mate as gun captain and the Richland's gunnery officer spotting from the bridge. The following day, 23 June, the ship's commanding officer wrote that his "routine inspection shows personnel well on [the] upgrade." On 25 June, Hills described his command's seakeeping qualities: "Built like a square rigger, she proves her shape by doing 11 kn (20 km/h; 13 mph) plus with a fair wind. Also rolls 35º with a 20 kn (37 km/h; 23 mph) Moderate Breeze under her quarter…"

Richland continued her passage toward the Philippine Islands as June 1945 ended and July began. Two west-bound Liberty ships, MARCOM EC-2 type freighters, overtook her and passed her on 2 July. On Independence Day, 4 July, piping in the salt water cooling system failed, resulting in lube oil in the main generators, an investigation revealing that iron pipe had been threaded into brass fixtures. Richland's crew showed their ingenuity in "robbing" Mount 21, 20 mmm gun, of its cooling well to provide a section of pipe since the ship's allowance list did not contain any spares.

After observing routine general quarters at dawn, Richland made landfall on the southern end of Aur Atoll on the morning of 7 July 1945, and zig-zagged during daylight hours. She made landfall at Wotho Atoll at 1400 on the 8th, Eniwetok at 1000 on the 9th, and Ulithi, in the Western Carolines, at 1400 on 14 July, noting heavy squalls and staying offshore in the very low visibility conditions. She also noted Japanese radio interference as "pretty bad."

Ultimately, a quarter of an hour into the second dog watch, 1815, on 16 July 1945, Richland entered the Philippine area, and reached Leyte Gulf at noon the following day, anchoring in Berth 38 at 2130. After spending a brief interval "repairing minor engine casualties, reporting for duty, drawing stores", 18–19 July, and trying unsuccessfully to "get [a] small boat to transport lube oil from IX (unclassified auxiliary) (Silver Cloud)," Richland received orders on 20 July from the port director to sail for Subic Bay at 0800 on the following morning. Weighing anchor at daylight on 21 July, Richland went alongside Silver Cloud at 0600 to obtain the lube oil she had not been able to on the 19th.

Making landfall at Subic at 2000 on 23 July 1945, Richland received a signal as she neared the entrance of that body of water at 2110: "Nets closed, stand off till daylight." Signaling "Request permission to enter as ordered" at 2220, Richland received the reply: "Stand off till daybreak" at 2235. Entering Subic Bay "in time for lunch" on the 24th, she anchored without a harbor chart. By the evening, she had received charts and a berth assignment. Shifting to Berth 39 on the 25th to wait her turn for unloading, learning that she was "no. 18 on [the] list…" Lt. Hills noted wryly in the war diary that the base at Subic seemed "in process of incubation."

As August 1945 began, Richland lay anchored in Berth 39, Subic Bay, ready to discharge cargo, attached to ServRon 9, Service Force, Seventh Fleet. Over the next several days, 2–4 August, 7–9 August, the ship discharged a cargo of frozen meat to the district patrol vessel YP-516 to be distributed among the tank landing ships at Subic Bay. Midway through the month of August, the cargo ship learned of her transfer to the Pacific Fleet's ServRon 8.

On 1 September 1945, with the war in its closing hours, Richland—still fully loaded with the exception of the frozen cargo that she had been able to discharge in early August—found herself attached simultaneously to ServRon 7 and ServRon 8, in addition to Service Division (ServDiv) 73. On 2 September, amidst those organizational concerns, an insulation fire demolished her Vapor Clarkson-manufactured auxiliary boiler, after which Lt. Hills "called for, and received," an inspection by NOB Subic Bay's maintenance officer. Since the Bureau of Ships (BuShips) had already ordered a replacement boiler, repairs would not be forthcoming.

Confusion, however, still shrouded the issue of exactly to which unit Richland belonged. On 4 September 1945, Lt. Hills noted receipt of a dispatch dissolving ServRon 8 and the fact that his ship was apparently in ServRon 7, ServDiv 73 "in spite of" earlier messages. Richland received orders to proceed to Subic Bay's unloading dock at 1600 on 9 September to unload material consigned to units in the Subic Bay area on 10 September. Moving away from the dock at 1745 on 14 September, however, with "considerable steel to be unloaded," Richland received the port director's office orders for her to sail at 0700 on 15 September, directions cancelled soon thereafter by a pilot bringing out orders not to sail. Thus remaining in mid stream, the ship completed unloading an hour before the start of the mid watch.

Shifting to Manila during the day on 16 September 1945, Richland shifted berths on the 20th, then moved into the inner harbor on the 22nd to receive 30 short tons (60,000 lb; 27,000 kg) of frozen beef from Cringle Reefer for the Army. After "standing by" for further orders on the 23rd, she shifted berths and received word on the 24th to prepare for an inspection by a Captain Johnson, Commander Service Division (ComServDiv) 73, which went off as planned at 0900 on the 26th. After a brief refitting for service, 27–28 September, Richland proceeded to the dock area on the morning of the 30th, to unload 1,500 short tons (3,000,000 lb; 1,400,000 kg) of Navy cargo, only to receive orders to load Army cargo instead.

Richland's commanding officer balked at the change. He sent a dispatch "refusing Army orders pending clarification of CincPac AlPac 162", apparently her original sailing orders, an event that instigated "several conferences…" wherein Lt. Hills posed four questions: "(1). Why am I continued in ServRon 7 after being transferred to ServRon 8 by CinCPac Serial 06866 of Aug. (2). Where did Army get authority before I was ordered to report to AF (Army Forces) WesPac for operations? (3). On dissolving of ComServFor Seventh Fleet, and transfer of this command to ServRon 8, does ComServFor Seventh Fleet confidential serial 01453 of 11 June 1945 remain in force?" and, almost plaintively, "(4). Why over two months to unload a Navy ship?"

With quick resolution of the foregoing administrative issues, Richland completed loading 100 short tons (200,000 lb; 91,000 kg) of chilled and frozen army cargo in her number four auxiliary hold on 3 October 1945. With 1,500 tons of Navy cargo and 100 tons for the Army on board, she sailed from Manila the following day, setting course for Mindoro, her Army orders endorsed by ComServDiv 73. Dropping anchor off Mindoro at 1025 on 5 October, the ship began unloading the meat she had brought from Manila, a process that continued until completed on the 7th, after which she sailed an hour before the end of the afternoon watch that day to return whence she had come.

Dropping anchor in Berth 66, Manila, on 8 October 1945, Richland shifted berths the following day, at which point, Lt. Hills observed, she "started proceedings again, toward getting Manila cargo (loaded June 1st) out of the holds…" Three days later, on 11 October, the ship received a "dispatch from ComServFor as info. adee. Stopping boiler repairs and advising return to US for decommissioning." She learned on 24 October that AFWesPac had in fact requested that Richland be released from army jurisdiction two days before. That same day, 24 October, a dispatch from the commander in chief of Army Forces at Manila had reported that Richland required "extensive boiler repairs," and had recommended that the ship be returned to the United States for decommissioning, stating that "repairs [were] not warranted." Learning also that the "Army is taking over cargo for disposition," Lt. Hills spent that day "coordinating Army Navy efforts" to that end. After the ship moored at Pier 13, Manila, on 30 October to facilitate completion of the unloading, Hills personally reported the state of affairs to the ComServRon 7 operations office.

=== Post-war inactivation ===
After taking on a full capacity load of fresh water on 31 October 1945, Richland completed unloading operations on 1 November, and after the ship had shifted berths once more, Lt. Hills reported his command ready to sail on 3 November to the US for decommissioning. She took on 100,000 US gal (380,000 L; 83,000 imp gal) of diesel fuel on the 2nd, and reported "water, fuel, lube oil, food and supplies for any possible trip (up to 90 days)." Standing by, waiting for sailing directions and orders, occupied Richland until 9 November, at which point ComServRon 7 ordered her to proceed to New Orleans for decommissioning. Consequently, the cargo ship sailed from Manila at 1600 on 9 November.

Reaching Balboa, C.Z., on 16 December 1945, Richland transited the Panama Canal, reaching Colon and reporting for temporary duty to Commander in Chief, US Atlantic Fleet that same day. Delayed by bad weather as she neared New Orleans, she reached her destination three days before Christmas, 22 December. She proceeded on to Mobile, Alabama, on 21 January, and she made port the following day.

Decommissioned on 23 January 1946 at Mobile and returned to the War Shipping Administration (WSA), Richland was stricken from the List of Naval Vessels on 7 February 1946. Although originally earmarked for lay-up in the James River, the ship, retaining her original name, was redelivered to MARCOM and placed in the Reserve Fleet. Richland lay berthed at Mobile until sold to Pyramid Ventures Group, Inc., on 15 December 1971, for $35,000 and non-transportation use. Withdrawn from the reserve fleet on 12 January 1972, the ship began her last voyage, toward disposal, on that date.

== Notes ==
Citations

== Bibliography ==
Online resources

- Cressman, Robert J. (7 July 2016). "Richland (AK-207)". Dictionary of American Naval Fighting Ships. Naval History and Heritage Command. This article incorporates text from this source, which is in the public domain.
- "C1 Cargo Ships". www.ShipbuildingHistory.com. 28 August 2009.
- "Richland (AK-207)". NavSource. 8 November 2013.
- "Richland (AK-207)". United States Department of Transportation. Archived from the original on July 8, 2015.
