= KAHS =

KAHS may refer to:

- KAHS-LP, a low-power radio station (106.5 FM) licensed to serve Aberdeen, Washington, United States
- KPHN, a radio station (1360 AM) licensed to serve El Dorado, Kansas, United States, which held the call sign KAHS from 2002 to 2014
- KIIS (defunct), a defunct radio station (850 AM) formerly licensed to serve Thousand Oaks, California, United States, which held the call sign KAHS from 1995 to 1998
- KVTA, a radio station (1590 AM) licensed to serve Ventura, California, which held the call sign KAHS from 1994 to 1995
- Kwajalein Atoll High School in Kwajalein, Marshall Islands
