= Northern Islands =

Northern Islands may refer to:

- Northern Islands High School, a secondary school in Wotje, Marshall Islands
- Northern Islands Municipality, one of the four main political divisions of the Commonwealth of the Northern Mariana Islands
- Northern Islands (GPU family), a GPU family

== See also ==
- Northern Isles
