= Marshall Islands Public School System =

Education system in the Marshall Islands

Republic of Marshall Islands Public School System

Address
- 3 Amata Kabua Boulevard Majuro, MH, 96960; Marshall Islands
- Coordinates: 7.08634°N 171.37163°E

District information
- Type: Federal education authority
- Motto: Ej Ju El Byye En Loñjat
- Grades: K – 12^{th}
- Established: November 2013; 11 years ago
- Commissioner: K. Hosia
- Asst. superintendent(s): H. Lafita
- School board: National Board of Education
- Director of education: N. Andrike
- Governing agency: Ministry of Education, Sports, & Training
- Accreditation: Western Association of Schools and Colleges

Other information
- Website: pss.edu.mh

Republic of Marshall Islands Public School System (PSS) is the public school system of the Marshall Islands, headquartered in Majuro. It was established in November 2013 by Public Law 2013-23.

It is a part of the Ministry of Education, Sports and Training.

== Schools ==
=== Elementary schools ===
The system's Division of Instruction and School Management, headed by an Associate Commissioner, is responsible for the operation of its elementary schools:

- Ailinglaplap
  - Airok Ailinglaplap
  - Buoj Elementary School
  - Enewa Elementary School
  - Jah Elementary School
  - Jeh Elementary School
  - Jobwon Elementary School
  - Katiej Elementary School
  - Mejel Elementary School
  - Woja Elementary School
- Ailuk
  - Ailuk Elementary School
  - Enejelar Elementary School
- Arno
  - Arno Elementary School
  - Bikarej Elementary School
  - Ine Elementary School
  - Jabo Elementary School
  - Kilange Elementary School
  - Longar Elementary School
  - Lukoj Elementary School
  - Matolen Elementary School
  - Tinak Elementary School
  - Tutu Elementary School
  - Ulien Elementary School
- Aur Atoll
  - Aur Elementary School
  - Tobal Elementary School
- Ebon Atoll
  - Ebon Elementary School
  - Enekoion Elementary School
  - Toka Elementary School
- Enewetak
  - Enewetak Elementary School
- Jabat
  - Jabat Elementary School
- Jaluit
  - Imiej Elementary School
  - Imroj Elementary School
  - Jabnoden Elementary School
  - Jabor Elementary School
  - Jaluit Elementary School
  - Mejrirok Elementary School
  - Narmej Elementary School
- Kili Island
  - Kili Elementary School
- Kwajalein
  - Carlos Elementary School
  - Ebadon Elementary School
  - Ebeye Public Elementary School
  - Ebeye Public Middle School
  - Eniburr Elementary School
  - Mejatto Elementary School on Mejatto serves Ronglap people
- Lae Atoll
  - Lae Elementary School
- Lib Island
  - Lib Elementary School
- Likiep
  - Jebal Elementary School
  - Likieb Elementary School
  - Melang Elementary School
- Majuro
  - Ajeltake Elementary School
  - Delap Elementary School - In 2016 the Western Association of Schools and Colleges (WASC) re-accredited the school until 2022.
  - Ejit Elementary School
  - Laura Elementary School
  - Long Island Elementary School
  - Majuro Middle School
  - Rairok Elementary School
  - Rita Elementary School - WASC accredited Rita Elementary in 2018.
  - North Delap Elementary School
  - Woja Maj. Elementary School
- Maloelap
  - Aerok Elementary School
  - Jang Elementary School
  - Kaben Elementary School
  - Ollet Elementary School
  - Tarawa Elementary School
- Mejit Island
  - Mejit Elementary School
- Mili Atoll
  - Enejet Elementary School
  - Lukonwod Elementary School
  - Mili Elementary School
  - Nallo Elementary School
  - Tokewa Elementary School
- Namdrik Atoll
  - Namdrik Elementary School
- Namu Atoll
  - Loen Elementary School
  - Mae Elementary School
  - Majkin Elementary School
  - Namo Elementary School
- Ujae
  - Ujae Elementary School
- Utrik
  - Utrik Elementary School
- Wotho
  - Wotho Elementary School
- Wotje←
  - Wodmej Elementary School
  - Wotje Elementary School

=== Secondary schools ===
The Office of Secondary and Career Education is responsible for serving students that have completed their primary education and reached the age of 14, enrolling them in one of the following six secondary schools it operates:

- Jaluit High School (JHS) - Jaluit Atoll
- Kwajalein Atoll High School (KAHS) - Kwajalein Atoll
- Laura High School (LHS) - Majuro Atoll - WASC accredited Laura High in 2018.
- Marshall Islands High School (MIHS) - Majuro Atoll
- Northern Islands High School (NIHS) - Wotje Atoll
- Life Skills Academy - Majuro

== See also ==
- Ministry of Education (Marshall Islands)
