= Northern Islands High School =

Location
- Wotje; Marshall Islands
- Coordinates: 9°27′50″N 170°14′17″E

Information
- Type: High school
- School district: Marshall Islands Public School System

Northern Islands High School (NIHS) is a secondary school in Wotje, Marshall Islands. It is a part of the Marshall Islands Public School System.

The school serves the following atolls and islands in the north of the country: Wotje, Ailuk, Aur, Likiep, Maloelap, Mejit, and Utrik.

It has a boarding program for students from distant atolls and islands.

== History ==
Anil Construction built the building. The construction plans were finalized in 1991. The school was scheduled to open in 1998.
