= Kwajalein Atoll High School =

Location
- Kwajalein; Marshall Islands; 8°50′51″N 167°44′34″E

Information
- Type: High school
- School district: Marshall Islands Public School System

Kwajalein Atoll High School is a secondary school in Kwajalein, Marshall Islands. It is a part of the Marshall Islands Public School System.

The school serves the following atolls and islands: Kwajalein, Lae, Ujae, and Wotto.
