= Ailuk Atoll =

Atoll in the Marshall Islands

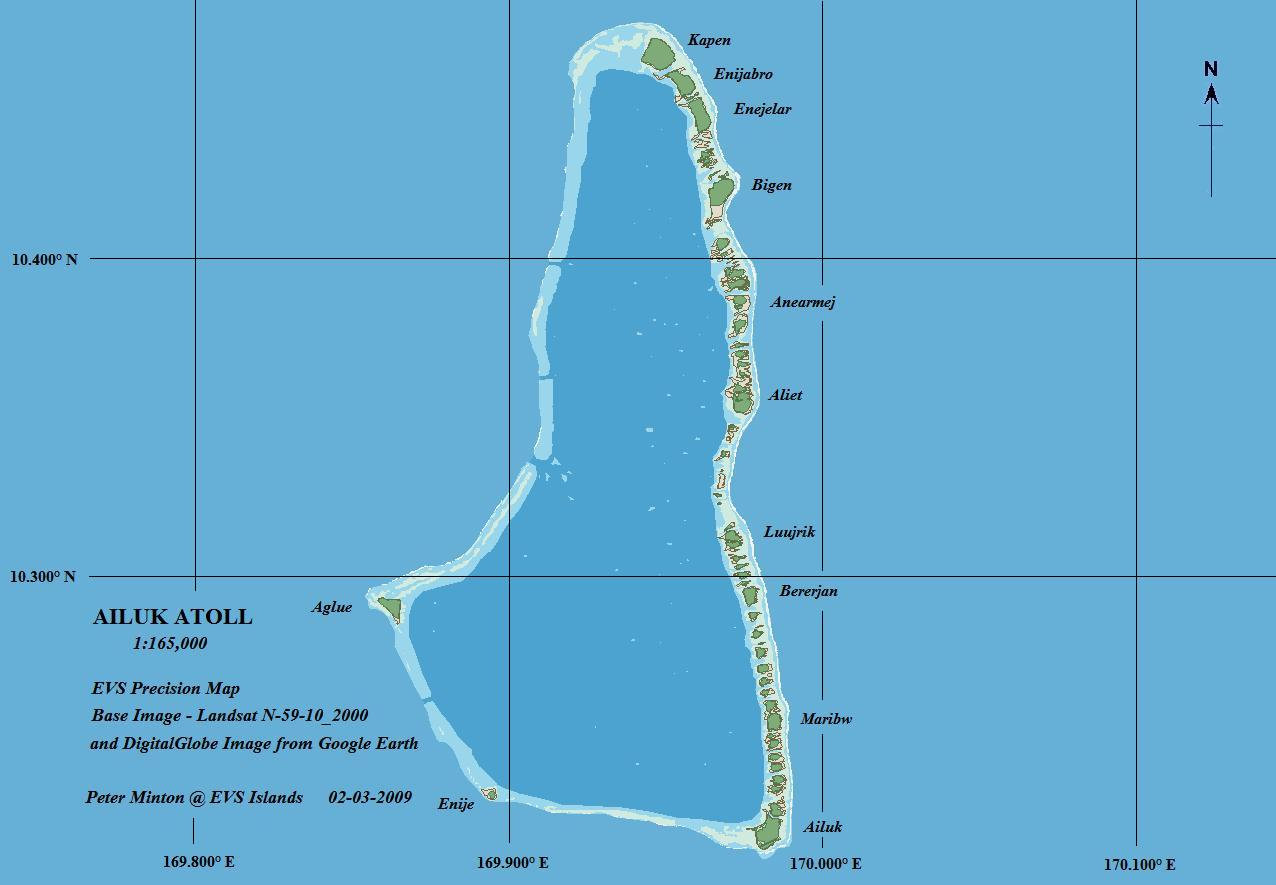
- Map of Ailuk Atoll

- Location within Marshall Islands

Geography
- Location: North Pacific
- Coordinates: 10°19′40″N 169°56′00″E
- Archipelago: Marshall Islands
- Total islands: 57
- Area: 5.4 km^{2} (2.1 sq mi)
- Highest elevation: 3 m (10 ft)

Administration
- Marshall Islands

Demographics
- Population: 235 (2021)
- Ethnic groups: Marshallese

Flag of Ailuk Atoll

Ailuk Atoll (Marshallese: Aelok, [ɑelʲokʷ]) is an inhabited coral atoll of 57 islets in the Pacific Ocean, and forms a legislative district of the Ratak Chain of the Marshall Islands.

== Geography ==
It is located approximately 72 kilometers (45 mi) north from Wotje and 92 kilometers (57 mi) south of Utirik in the northern half of the Ratak chain. It is 393 kilometers (244 mi) north of Majuro Atoll, the capital of the Marshall Islands. Its total land area is 5.4 square kilometers (2.1 sq mi) spread over 57 islets enclosing a lagoon covering 177.45 square kilometers (68.51 sq mi).

== Physical features ==
The major islets are: Ajelep, Aliej, Ailuk, Alkilwe, Barorkan, Biken, Enejabrok, Enejelar, Kapen and Marib. There are villages on Ailuk and Enejelar. Most of the islets are on the eastern side of the atoll. The western and southern sides of the atoll have a nearly continuous submerged coral reef. Three main passes enter the lagoon through the western reef: Erappu, Marok and Eneneman.

Based on the results of drilling operations on Enewetak (Eniwetok) Atoll, in the nearby Ralik Chain of the Marshall Islands, Ailuk may include as much as 1,400 m (4,600 ft) of reef material atop a basalt rock base. As most local coral growth stops at about 45 m (148 ft) below the ocean surface, such a massive stony coral base suggests a gradual isostatic subsidence of the underlying extinct volcano, which itself rises 3,000 m (9,800 ft) from the surrounding ocean floor. Shallow water fossils taken from just above Enewetak's basalt base are dated to about 55mya.

== Climate ==
The Marshall Islands are positioned within the Northeast Trade Winds belt. During the greater part of the year the prevailing winds are from the north-east to the east.

Ailuk Atoll has a tropical rainforest climate, indicating consistently warm temperatures and high humidity. Temperatures range from 24 °C (75 °F) in April to 29 °C (84 °F) in September, averaging around 27 °C (81 °F).

Winter rainfall is comparatively modest, with January and February receiving about 51 mm (2.0 in) to 52 mm (2.0 in). Spring sees an increase from 78 mm (3.1 in) to 158 mm (6.2 in). The wettest months are August through October, increasing from 215 mm (8.5 in) to 270 mm (11 in). With increased precipitation comes more rainy days, reaching a peak in July with 25 days and longer rainstorms. December drops back to 17 rainy days and shorter showers.

Monthly sunshine ranges from 239 hours in January to 322 hours in July.

Ailuk Atoll

Climate chart (precipitation, max. and min. temperature)
J	F	M	A	M	J	J	A	S	O	N	D
51 28 25	52 28 24	78 28 25	111 29 24	158 29 25	153 29 25	158 29 25	215 29 25	253 29 25	270 29 25	250 29 25	73 29 25
- █ Average max. and min. temperatures in °C
- █ Precipitation totals in mm
- Source: nomadseason
Imperial conversion
J	F	M	A	M	J	J	A	S	O	N	D
2 82 77	2 82 75	3.1 82 77	4.4 84 75	6.2 84 77	6 84 77	6.2 84 77	8.5 84 77	10 84 77	11 84 77	9.8 84 77	2.9 84 77
- █ Average max. and min. temperatures in °F
- █ Precipitation totals in inches

== Vegetation ==
The atoll has been inhabited more or less continuously for 2000 years, and thus there has been considerable modification of islet ecologies.

In the Marshall Islands, higher latitudes correlate to increasing aridity for atolls, decreasing the variety in plant life, including edible species, leading to a decreasing food availability. Almost all households have food crops around their homes and land. Water and soil is the most limiting factor for plant growth especially for cultivated crops in the atolls. Only tree crops like breadfruits, coconuts and pandanus with a few bananas are visible around homes and settlements. Every household have access to these tree crops for daily substance.

The lagoon adjacent portion of eastern islets are planted with coconuts. This is surrounded by a crescent of dense mixed forest, often edged with Pandanus. Guettarda, Pandanus, Tournefortia and Scaevola taccada make up the taller part, next to the Pandanus and coconuts. This slopes seaward (and windward) becoming more of a largely Scaevola scrub. The horns of this forest crescent extend along the passage beaches, usually with Suriana and Pemphis on the margins. The outermost windward land is usually a beaten-down scrub of gnarled Pemphis and Suriana scrub, sometimes with Tournefortia and Scaevola. This extends onto the denuded ocean surf facing part of the islets.

== Fauna ==
=== Birds ===
Common resident seabirds include the Red-tailed Tropicbird, Red-footed Booby, Sooty Tern, White Tern, Brown Noddy, and Black Noddy.

Common land birds include the Reef Heron, Golden Plover, Whimbrel, Bristle-thighed Curlew, Bar-tailed Godwit, Wandering Tattler, Ruddy Turnstone, Sanderling, Sharp-tailed Sandpiper, and Long-tailed New Zealand Cuckoo.

Introduced species include the domestic chicken and ground dove.

== History ==
=== Prehistory ===
About 2000 years ago, Oceanic speakers who made plainware pottery (late Lapita) and used shell adzes, fishhooks, and other implements migrated from the Solomon Islands to found settlements on several volcanic islands of central Micronesia (Chuuk, Pohnpei, and Kosrae), and colonize the atolls of the Marshall Islands.

=== 16th to 19th Century ===
First recorded sighting of Ailuk Atoll by Europeans was by the Spanish expedition of Miguel López de Legazpi on 10 January 1565. It was charted as Los Placeres (The Pleasures in Spanish). Two of its islets were charted as San Pedro and San Pablo, those being the names of the flagship ("capitana") and the "almiranta" (secondary ship or ship of the Admiral)

Ailuk Atoll was claimed by the German Empire along with the rest of the Marshall Islands in 1885.

=== 20th century to present ===
After World War I, the island came under the South Seas Mandate of the Empire of Japan. Following the end of World War II, it came under the control of the United States as part of the Trust Territory of the Pacific Islands until the independence of the Marshall Islands in 1986.

In December 2020, Marshall Islands police found an abandoned 5.5-meter (18-foot) fibreglass boat that washed ashore at Ailuk Atoll with 649 kilograms (1,430 pounds) of cocaine worth an estimated US$80 million. This was the largest drug haul in Marshall Islands history.

== Demographics ==
Ailuk Atoll had a population of 235 in 2021.

== Infrastructure ==
=== Transportation ===
There is a pier and an airstrip on Ailuk islet. The atoll is unique among the Marshall Islands in still commonly using sailing outrigger canoes for local inter islet transportation and fishing, sparing the residents dependence on infrequent fuel and spare part resupply.

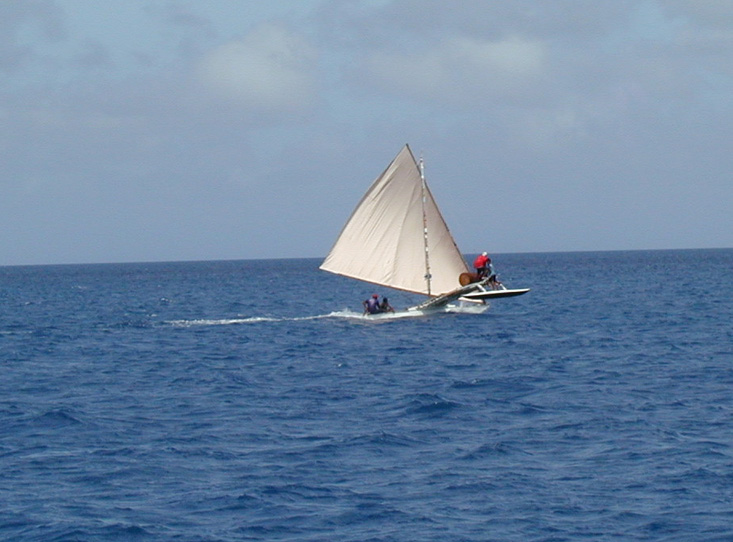
Marshallese - traditional sailing canoe

=== Services ===
There are medical facilities on both Ailuk and Enejelar. Ailuk has mobile phone accessibility, but no internet access. All households in both communities have solar power for lighting. Less than 50% use theirs for refrigeration, with the rest using the public school’s solar power. The Ailuk City Hall provides a space for community meetings and some basic administrative services.

=== Education ===
Marshall Islands Public School System operates public schools:

- Ailuk Elementary School
- Enejelar Elementary School

Northern Islands High School on Wotje serves the community.

== See also ==
- Desert island
- List of islands
