= Ratak =

Chain of Islands and atolls in the Pacific

Coordinates: 9°00′N 171°00′E

Ratak Chain
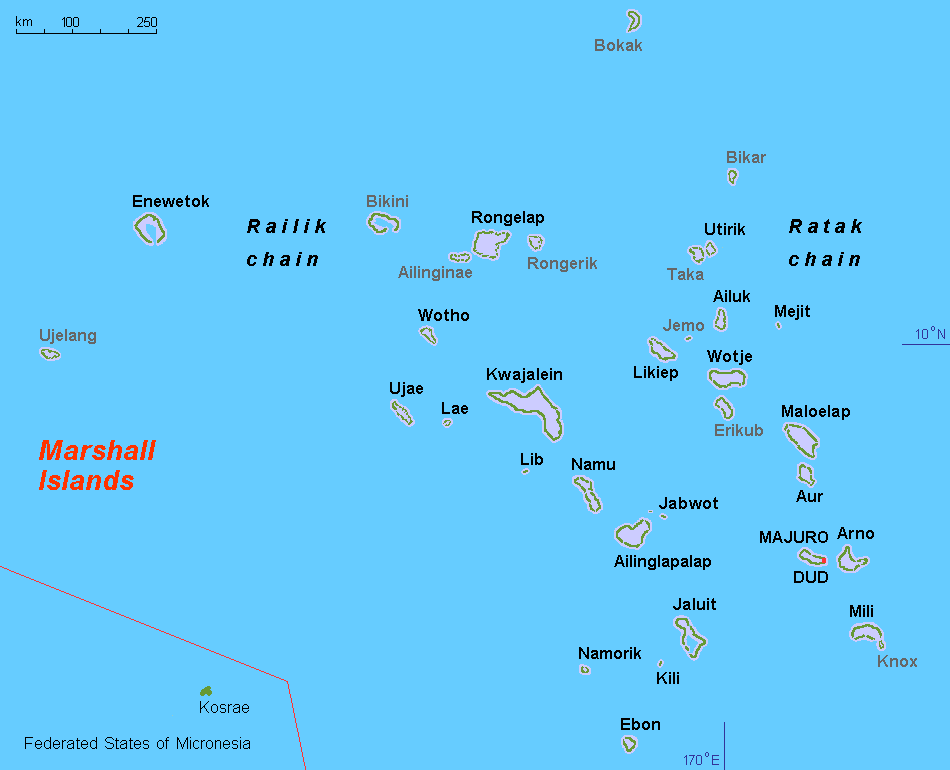
- Map of the Ratak (right) and Ralik island chains
- Interactive map of Ratak Chain

Geography
- Location: Pacific Ocean

Administration
- Marshall Islands

The Ratak Chain (Ratak [rˠɑːdˠɑk], Marshallese for 'sunrise') is a chain of islands and atolls within the island nation of the Marshall Islands. It lies to the east of the country's other island chain, the Ralik Chain. In 1999, the total population of the Ratak islands was 30,925.

The atolls and isolated islands in the chain are:

- Ailuk Atoll
- Arno Atoll
- Aur Atoll
- Bikar Atoll
- Bokak Atoll
- Erikub Atoll
- Jemo Island
- Knox Atoll
- Likiep Atoll
- Majuro Atoll
- Maloelap Atoll
- Mejit Island
- Mili Atoll
- Taka Atoll
- Utirik Atoll
- Wotje Atoll

The Ratak Chain forms a continuous chain of seamounts with the Gilbert Islands to the south, which are part of Kiribati.

== Language ==
The Ratak Chain is home to the Ratak dialect (or eastern dialect) of the Marshallese language. It is mutually intelligible with the Rālik dialect (or western dialect) located on the Rālik Chain. The two dialects differ mainly in lexicon and in certain regular phonological reflexes.
