= Mejit Island =

Island and district of the Marshall Islands

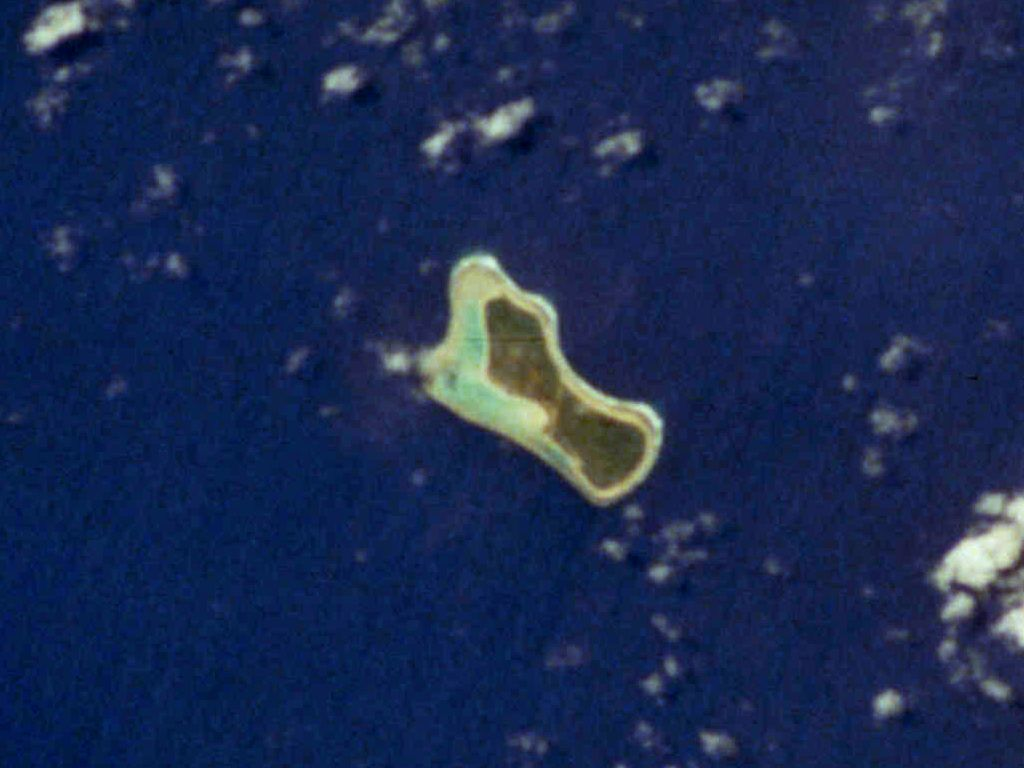
- NASA picture of Mejit Island

- Location within Marshall Islands

Geography
- Location: North Pacific
- Coordinates: 10°17′N 170°52′E
- Archipelago: Ratak
- Total islands: 1
- Area: 1.86 km^{2} (0.72 sq mi)
- Highest elevation: 3 m (10 ft)

Administration
- Marshall Islands

Demographics
- Population: 230 (2021)
- Ethnic groups: Marshallese

Mejit (Marshallese: Mājej, [mʲæzʲɛːtʲ], or Mājeej, [mʲæzʲɛːtʲ]) is an island in the Pacific Ocean, and forms a legislative district of the Ratak Chain of the Marshall Islands. Unlike most of the other islands of the Marshall Islands, Mejit is a stony island rather than a coral atoll, although it is surrounded by a fringing coral reef enclosing a narrow lagoon. It is located east of the main line of the Ratak chain, approximately 110 kilometers (68 mi) northeast from Wotje. The population was 230 at the 2021 census.

The island is lush in pandanus, breadfruit and taro. To the residents, this island is known as 'Paradise". It has a freshwater lake (rare in the Marshall Islands) with indigenous ducks. Mejit is famous for its pandanus leaf mats.

An airstrip, Mejit Airport, bisects the island. It is served by Air Marshall Islands.

== History ==
First recorded sighting by Europeans was by the Spanish expedition of Miguel López de Legazpi on 9 January 1565. It was charted as Los Barbudos (The Bearded in Spanish) because of the long beards of its inhabitants. Its sighting was also recorded by the Spanish expedition of Ruy López de Villalobos on December 1542.

The German navigator Otto von Kotzebue, sailing in Russian service, made landfall at Mejit Island on January 1, 1817, and named it New Year's Island. In 1885, Mejit was claimed by the German Empire along with the rest of the Marshall Islands. After World War I, the island came under the South Seas Mandate of the Empire of Japan. The island was recovered from the Japanese by U.S. Forces on 2 April 1944. Following the end of World War II, it came under the control of the United States as part of the Trust Territory of the Pacific Islands until the independence of the Marshall Islands in 1986.

== Education ==
Marshall Islands Public School System operates Mejit Elementary School. Northern Islands High School on Wotje serves the community.
