= Lae Atoll =

Atoll and municipality of the Marshall Island

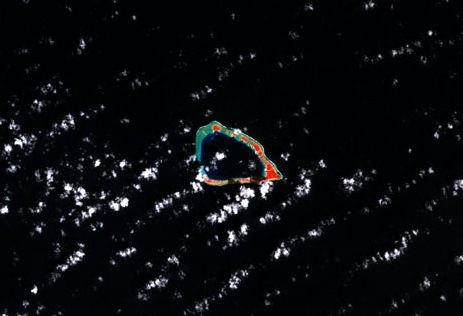
- NASA false-color photograph of Lae Atoll

- Location within Marshall Islands

Geography
- Location: North Pacific
- Coordinates: 08°56′10″N 166°14′15″E
- Archipelago: Ralik
- Total islands: 20
- Area: 1.5 km^{2} (0.58 sq mi)
- Highest elevation: 3 m (10 ft)

Administration
- Marshall Islands

Demographics
- Population: 133 (2021)
- Ethnic groups: Marshallese

Lae Atoll (Marshallese: Lae, [lʲɑːɛ]) is a coral atoll of 20 islands in the Pacific Ocean, and forms a legislative district of the Ralik Chain of the Marshall Islands. Its total land area is only 1.5 square kilometers (0.58 sq mi), but it encloses a lagoon with an area of 17.7 square kilometers (6.8 sq mi). It is located approximately 47 kilometers (29 mi) east of Ujae Atoll. The population of Lae Atoll was 133 in 2021. Its islands include Lae, Looj (Lotj), Bilalalon, Riblong (Ribon) and Lweijab (Lejab).

== History ==
In early 1884, Japanese explorer and agent Suzuki Tsunenori was dispatched to Lae Atoll to investigate the murder of a Japanese sailor. When he arrived, he raised the national flag and claimed the island for Japan. However, he was ordered to return to the island to take down the flag, and the government made no formal gestures towards annexation of the islands. Lae Atoll was claimed by the German Empire along with the rest of the Marshall Islands in 1885. After World War I, the island came under the South Seas Mandate of the Empire of Japan. Following the end of World War II, Lae came under the control of the United States as part of the Trust Territory of the Pacific Islands. It has been part of the independent Republic of the Marshall Islands since 1986.

== Education ==
Marshall Islands Public School System operates Lae Elementary School.

Kwajalein Atoll High School on Kwajalein serves the community.
