= Lib Island =

Island of the Marshall Islands

- The island in the Marshall Islands

- Location within Marshall Islands

Geography
- Location: North Pacific
- Coordinates: 8°18′45″N 167°22′45″E
- Archipelago: Ralik
- Total islands: 1
- Area: 0.93 km^{2} (0.36 sq mi)
- Highest elevation: 3 m (10 ft)

Administration
- Marshall Islands

Demographics
- Population: 156 (2021)
- Ethnic groups: Marshallese

Lib Island (Marshallese: Ellep, [ɛllʲɛpʲ]) is an island in the Pacific Ocean. It is a legislative district of the Ralik Chain of the Marshall Islands. Its total land area is 0.93 km^{2} (0.36 sq mi). The population of Lib Island was 156 as per the 2021 census.

== History ==
The first recorded sighting by Europeans of Lib Island happened on 8 January 1565 by Spanish navigator Alonso de Arellano commanding patache San Lucas. It was charted by Arellano as Los Nadadores ("The Swimmers" in Spanish). In his account of the sighting, Arellano stated that the inhabitants of Lib would be fine for pulling an oar in a galley, being big and well made, and were warlike people, being expert in throwing stones with slings. He also expressed an opinion that they must be of the Devil because their island was a thousand leagues from firm land.

Captain Thomas Dennet of the British vessel Britannia sighted the island in 1797 on route from Australia to China and named it Princess Island.

== Education ==
Marshall Islands Public School System operates Lib Elementary School.
