= Jabat Island =

Pacific Ocean island in the Marshall Islands

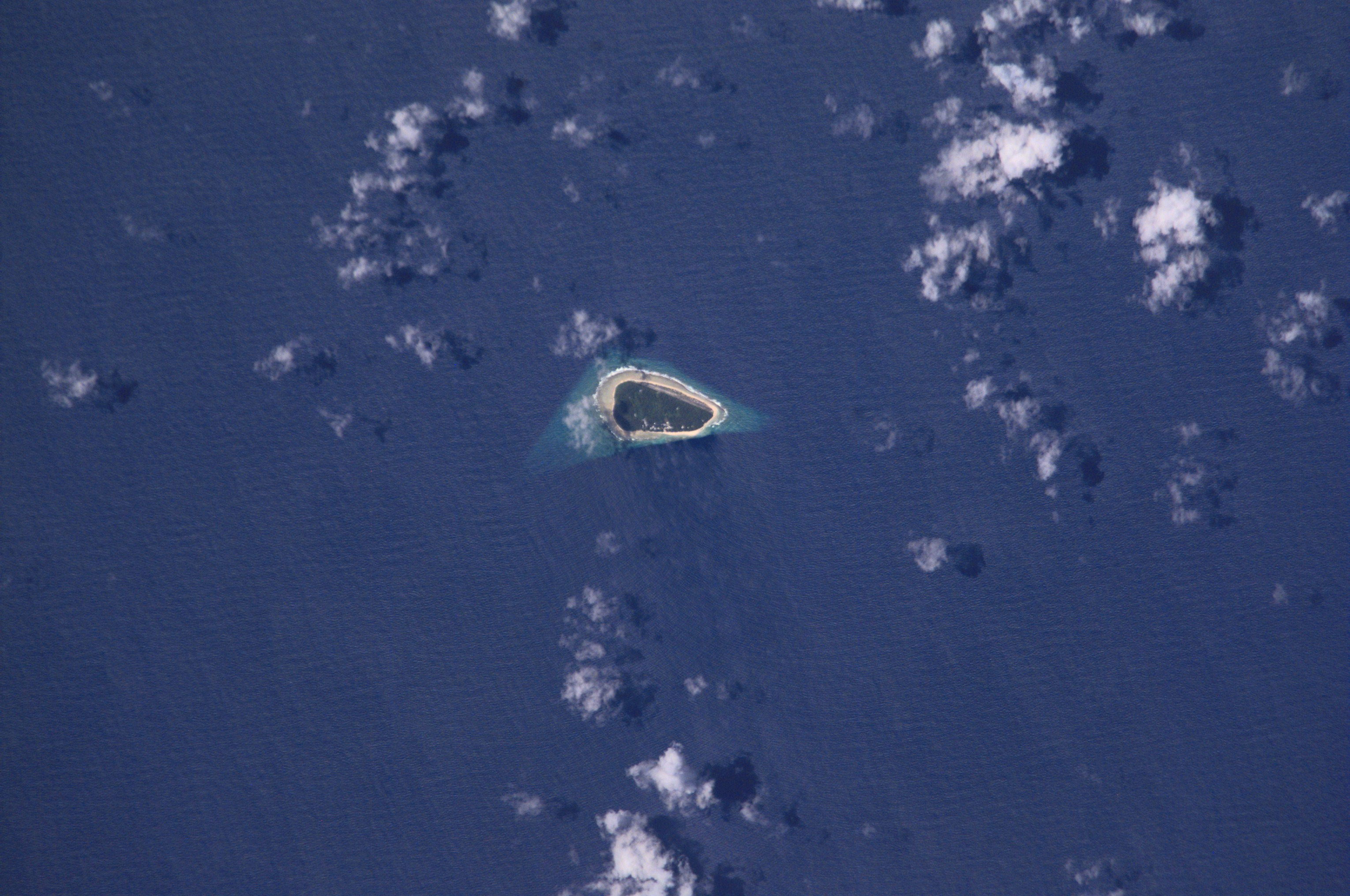
- NASA picture of Jabat Atoll

- Map of the island in the Marshall islands

- Location within Marshall Islands

Geography
- Location: North Pacific
- Coordinates: 7.7517°N 168.9767°E
- Archipelago: Ralik
- Total islands: 1
- Area: 0.6 km^{2} (0.23 sq mi)
- Highest elevation: 3 m (10 ft)

Administration
- Marshall Islands

Demographics
- Population: 75 (2021)
- Ethnic groups: Marshallese

Jabat Island (or Jabot Island or Jabwot Island; Marshallese: Jebat, [tʲɛbˠɑtˠ]) is an island in the Pacific Ocean, and forms a legislative district of the Ralik Chain of the Marshall Islands. Its total land area is only 0.6 square kilometers (0.23 sq mi), and has a length of 1.2 kilometers (0.75 mi). It is located 12 kilometers (7.5 mi) from Ailinglapalap Atoll. Unlike most of the other islands in the Marshall Islands, Jabat Island is a rocky island rather than a coral atoll, although it surrounded by fringing shallow water coral reefs that extend for several kilometres beyond the outer reef to the north and south. The population of Jabat Island was 75 in 2021.

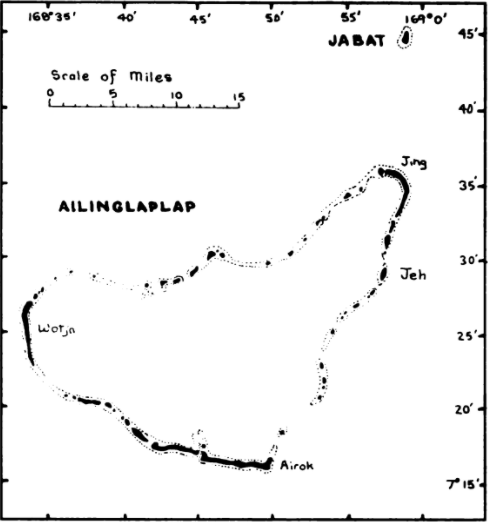
Map of the island

== History ==
First recorded sighting of Jabat Island was by the Spanish navigator Alonso de Arellano on 8 January 1565 on board of the patache San Lucas.

Jabat Island was claimed by the German Empire along with the rest of the Marshall Islands in 1885. Along with other German possessions in the Pacific, it was taken by the Empire of Japan during World War I and remained under Japanese rule during the interwar South Seas Mandate. Following the end of World War II, it came under the control of the United States as part of the Trust Territory of the Pacific Islands until the independence of the Marshall Islands in 1986.

== Education ==
Marshall Islands Public School System operates Jabat Elementary School. Students are zoned to Jaluit High School in Jaluit Atoll.
