= Ralik =

Chain of islands within the Marshall Islands

Ralik Chain
Native name: Rālik
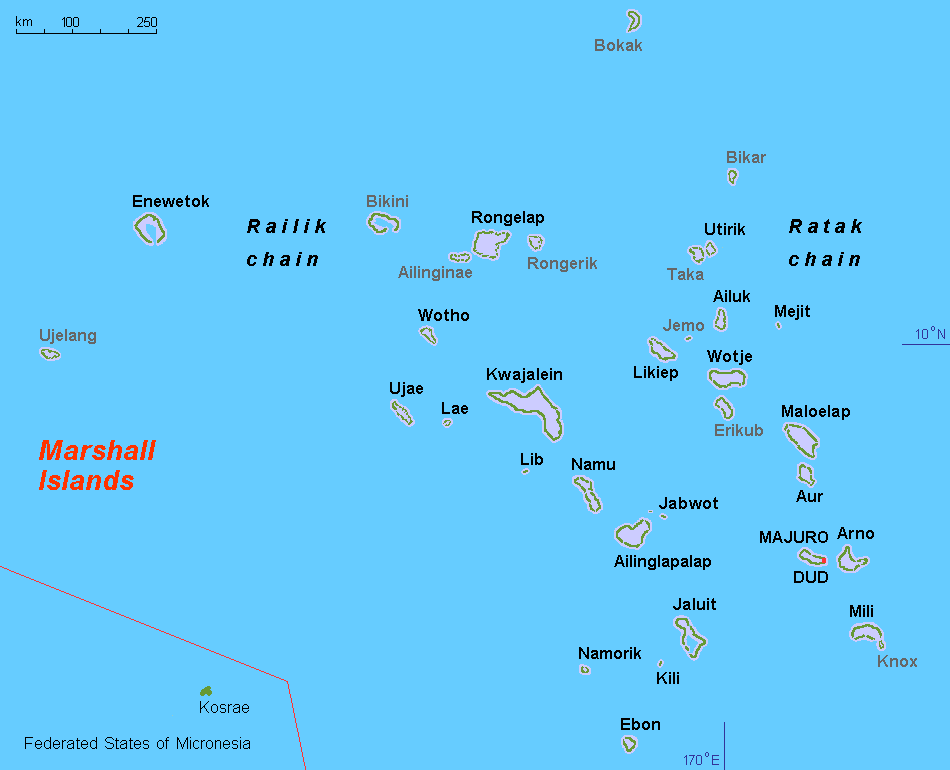
- Map of the Ralik (left) and Ratak island chains
- Interactive map of Ralik Chain

Geography
- Location: Pacific Ocean
- Coordinates: 8°00′N 167°00′E

Administration
- Marshall Islands

The Ralik Chain (Marshallese: Rālik, [rˠæːlʲik]) is a chain of islands within the island nation of the Marshall Islands. Ralik means "sunset". It is west of the Ratak Chain. In 1999, the total population of the Ralik islands was 19,915.

== Atolls and islands ==
List of atolls and isolated islands in the chain:

- Ailinginae Atoll
- Ailinglaplap Atoll
- Bikini Atoll
- Ebon Atoll
- Enewetak Atoll
- Jabat Island
- Jaluit Atoll
- Kili Island
- Kwajalein Atoll
- Lae Atoll
- Lib Island
- Namdrik Atoll
- Namu Atoll
- Rongdrik Atoll
- Rongelap Atoll
- Ujae Atoll
- Ujelang Atoll
- Wotho Atoll

== Language ==
The Rālik Chain is home to the Rālik dialect (or western dialect) of the Marshallese language. It is mutually intelligible with the Ratak dialect (or eastern dialect) located on the Ratak Chain. The two dialects differ mainly in lexicon and in certain regular phonological reflexes.
