= Kili Island =

Atoll in the Marshall Islands

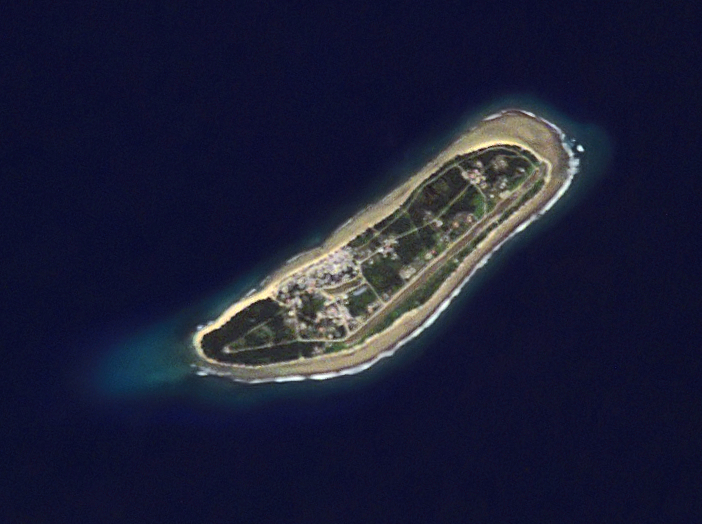
- NASA Astronaut Photography image of Kili Island

- Map of the island

- Location within Marshall Islands

Geography
- Location: North Pacific
- Coordinates: 5°38′46″N 169°07′42″E
- Archipelago: Ralik
- Total islands: 1
- Area: 0.93 km^{2} (0.36 sq mi)
- Highest elevation: 3 m (10 ft)

Administration
- Marshall Islands

Demographics
- Population: 415 (2021)
- Ethnic groups: Marshallese

Kili Island or Kili Atoll (Marshallese: Kōle, [kɤlʲe]) is a small, 81 hectares (200 acres) (0.93 square kilometers (0.36 sq mi)) island located in the Marshall Islands in the Pacific Ocean. As of 2021, 415 people lived on the island, many of whom were descended from islanders who originally lived on Bikini Atoll. They were relocated when they agreed to let the U.S. government temporarily use Bikini for nuclear testing in 1945, which they were told was of great importance to humankind, though it is sometimes considered a forced relocation. Kili Island became their home after two prior relocations failed. The island does not have a natural lagoon and cannot produce enough food to enable the islanders to be self-sufficient. It is part of the legislative district of the Ralik Chain of the Marshall Islands. The island is approximately 48 kilometers (30 mi) southwest of Jaluit. It is a good sized island for the Marshall Islands, but it is not an atoll with a lagoon.

== History ==
Captain Thomas Dennet of the British vessel Britannia sighted the atoll in 1797 on route from Australia to China and named it Hunter Island.

Kili Atoll was claimed by the German Empire along with the rest of the Marshall Islands in 1885. After World War I, the island came under the South Seas Mandate of the Empire of Japan. Following the end of World War II, it came under the control of the United States as part of the Trust Territory of the Pacific Islands.

== Bikini Atoll residents arrive ==
Kili was uninhabited until November 2, 1948 when the United States government relocated the Bikini Atoll's indigenous population from Rongerik Atoll, where they had previously been relocated after their first relocation to Kwajalein Atoll failed. The islanders had consented to what they believed was temporary use of their island for nuclear tests, thinking they would be able to return to their island home within a few years.

On Kwajalein Atoll, the islanders were living in tents on a strip of grass alongside the airport runway. In June 1948 the Bikini residents chose Kili Island as a long-term home. The small island was uninhabited and was not ruled by a paramount king, or iroij. In June the Bikini community chose two dozen men to accompany eight Seabees to Kili to begin constructing a village. In November 1948, the residents, now totaling 184 individuals, moved to Kili Island, but soon learned that the new location was incompatible with their traditional diet and lifestyle based on lagoon fishing.

In 1957, the Bikini residents, without any legal representation, signed an agreement with the United States that gave the U.S. complete control of Bikini Atoll. The Bikini families also gave up the right for any future claims against the United States. In exchange, they received $25,000 in cash and an additional $300,000 trust fund that yielded a semi-annual interest payment of approximately $5,000, or about $15 per person per year. They were also given Kili Island and several islands in Jaluit Atoll.

In the 1980s, there was a lawsuit that was dismissed, but overall it was seen that the Bikini deserved more help. Two large multi-million dollar trust-funds were set up at the time as resettlement trusts. In the following decades the trust fund, amounting to over 70 million dollars, delivered steady payments. In 2017 the KBE leaders requested unrestricted access to the whole Trust fund. The United States, which had previously monitored expenditures, reluctantly agreed. With full control over the Trust Fund, the total amount dropped from $70 million to $100,000 by early 2023. This triggered a financial collapse on Kili, with defaults on loans, unpaid wages, and services were halted. This situation created a major crisis, with a large amount of finger pointing. There were criticisms directed at officials in the USA, but in the end they had no control over the expenditures in this time period. This triggered investigations and protests.

== Limited sea access ==
Kili cannot be reached by ship four months out of the year because of rough seas. The grass Kili Airport is served by Air Marshall Islands, although flights have been grounded when its aircraft are not operational, or when the runway is flooded by rising ocean .

== Education ==
Marshall Islands Public School System operates Kili Elementary School. Students are zoned to Jaluit High School in Jaluit Atoll.

== Food production ==
Kili does not provide enough food for the transplanted residents. In 1949 the Trust Territory administration donated a 40-foot (12 m) ship for transporting copra between Kili and Jaluit Atoll. But the ship was washed by heavy surf onto the Kili reef in 1951 and was lost.

The main agricultural product of the island is currently copra. Island produce consists of (in descending order of quantity) coconuts, limes, breadfruit, squash, bananas, papayas, and sugar cane. Fishing in the ocean around the island is difficult due to the lack of protection by a lagoon.

The small island, about 1/6 the size of Bikini Atoll, which is 4 km (2.5 mi) long, also suffers from overpopulation. As of 2021, the population was 415, composed primarily of descendants of refugees of Bikini. Residents must import food paid for by a settlement agreement with the United States government to supplement what they can grow locally.

Each family on the island receives 2–3 shipments a year consisting of 1–2 boxes of frozen chicken, 2–4 50 lb bags of flour, and 2–4 bags of rice; this shipment is provided by the Bikinian government in conjunction with the U.S. government. Imports are overseen by the Bikini Public Works Department, which also maintains houses and runs the power plant on the island. There is currently a government effort to increase farming on the island, but the coral reef soil is poor. However, there is a small farm that produces melons and some vegetables. There are several small stores operated out of homes that provide nonperishable food items such as salt, Tabasco, candy, and canned items.

Families on Kili live in cinder block houses with air-conditioning and electricity. Most houses on Kili have kitchens, but many prefer to cook outdoors in cook-huts over an open flame.

== Climate change impact ==
Beginning in 2011 the resettled residents of Kili Island began to experience periods of ocean flooding they attribute to global warming. The highest point of Kili Island is only 3 meters (9.8 ft) above sea level. Ocean waves have covered portions of the island at least five times from 2011 to 2015, contaminating all of the wells on the island. The runway servicing the island is unusable during and after rains because it becomes extremely muddy. In August 2015, the Bikini Council passed a resolution requesting assistance from US government to modify terms of the Resettlement Trust Fund for the People of Bikini to be used for the population's relocation once again, this time outside of the Marshall Islands.

== Churches and education ==
Kili has two Christian churches: the Assembly of God and Protestant church. There is an elementary school on Kili for students from kindergarten to eighth grade. There is a class for each age group, in addition to one class for students with special needs. Classes typically range in size from 6 to 18 students. Some of the teachers are native to Kili, some come from neighboring islands. The Dartmouth Volunteer Teaching Program has placed 2–4 American volunteer teachers at the school every year since 2000. The teachers provide English language instruction in addition to other curricula because there are few instructional materials or books written in Marshallese. The American volunteers stay and teach for one or more years. Toward the end of their eighth grade year, students must pass a standardized test to gain admission to public high school in Jaluit or Majuro.
