= Aur Atoll =

Atoll and administrative territorial entity in Marshall Islands

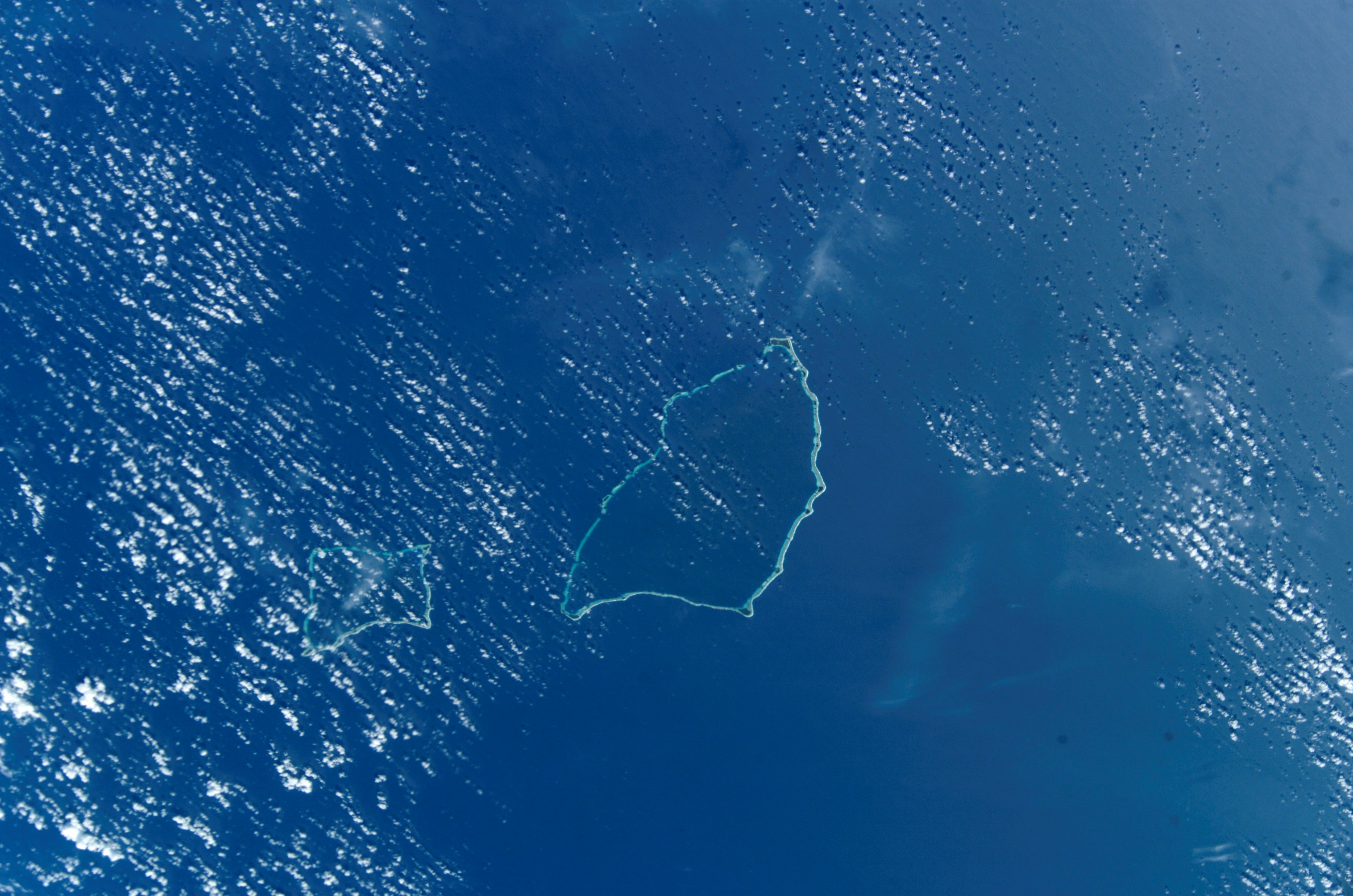
- NASA picture of Aur (left) and Maloelap (centre) Atolls

- Location in the Marshall Islands

- Location within Marshall Islands

Geography
- Location: North Pacific
- Coordinates: 8°12′N 171°06′E
- Archipelago: Ratak
- Total islands: 42
- Area: 5.6 km^{2} (2.2 sq mi)
- Highest elevation: 3 m (10 ft)

Administration
- Marshall Islands

Demographics
- Population: 317 (2021)
- Ethnic groups: Marshallese

Aur Atoll (Marshallese: Aur [ɑurˠ]) is a coral atoll of 42 islands in the Pacific Ocean, and forms a legislative district of the Ratak Chain of the Marshall Islands. Its total land area is only 15 square kilometers (5.6 sq mi), but it encloses a lagoon with an area of 620 square kilometers (240 sq mi). It is located south of Maloelap Atoll. The population of Aur Atoll was 317 in 2021.

== History ==
Aur Atoll was claimed by the German Empire along with the rest of the Marshall Islands in 1885. After World War I, the island came under the South Seas Mandate of Japan. Following the end of World War II, Aur came under the control of the United States as part of the Trust Territory of the Pacific Islands. It became part of independent Republic of the Marshall Islands in 1986.

== Sister City ==
Aur Atoll has Taoyuan, Taiwan as a sister city since 2018.

== Education ==
Marshall Islands Public School System operates public schools:

- Aur Elementary School
- Tobal Elementary School

Northern Islands High School on Wotje serves the community.
