= Namdrik Atoll =

Coral atoll in the Ralik Chain, Marshall Islands

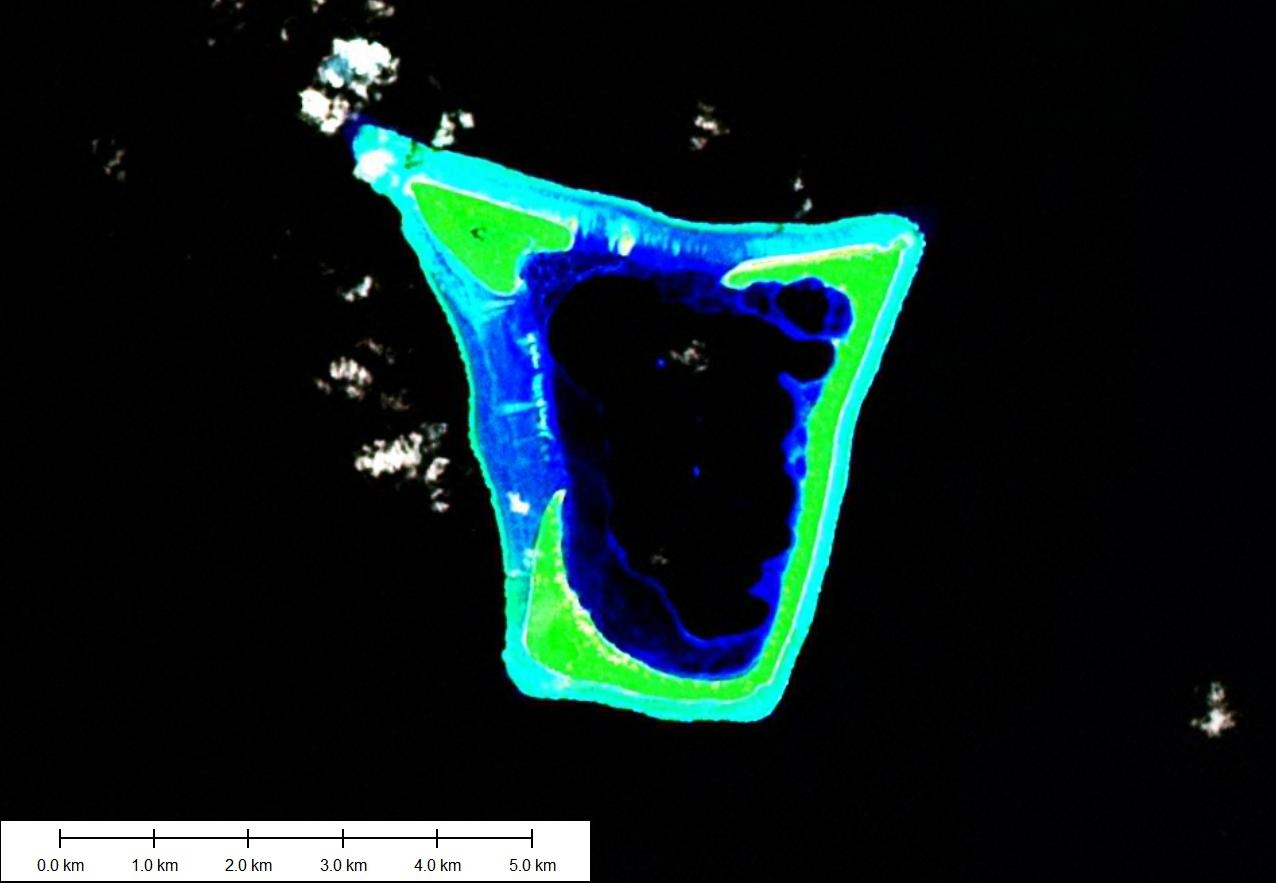
- Landsat picture of Namdik Atoll

- Atoll in the Marshall Islands

- Location within Marshall Islands

Geography
- Location: North Pacific
- Coordinates: 05°37′00″N 168°07′00″E
- Archipelago: Ralik
- Total islands: 2
- Area: 2.8 km^{2} (1.1 sq mi)
- Highest elevation: 3 m (10 ft)

Administration
- Marshall Islands

Demographics
- Population: 299 (2021)
- Ethnic groups: Marshallese

Ramsar Wetland
- Designated: 2 February 2012
- Reference no.: 2072

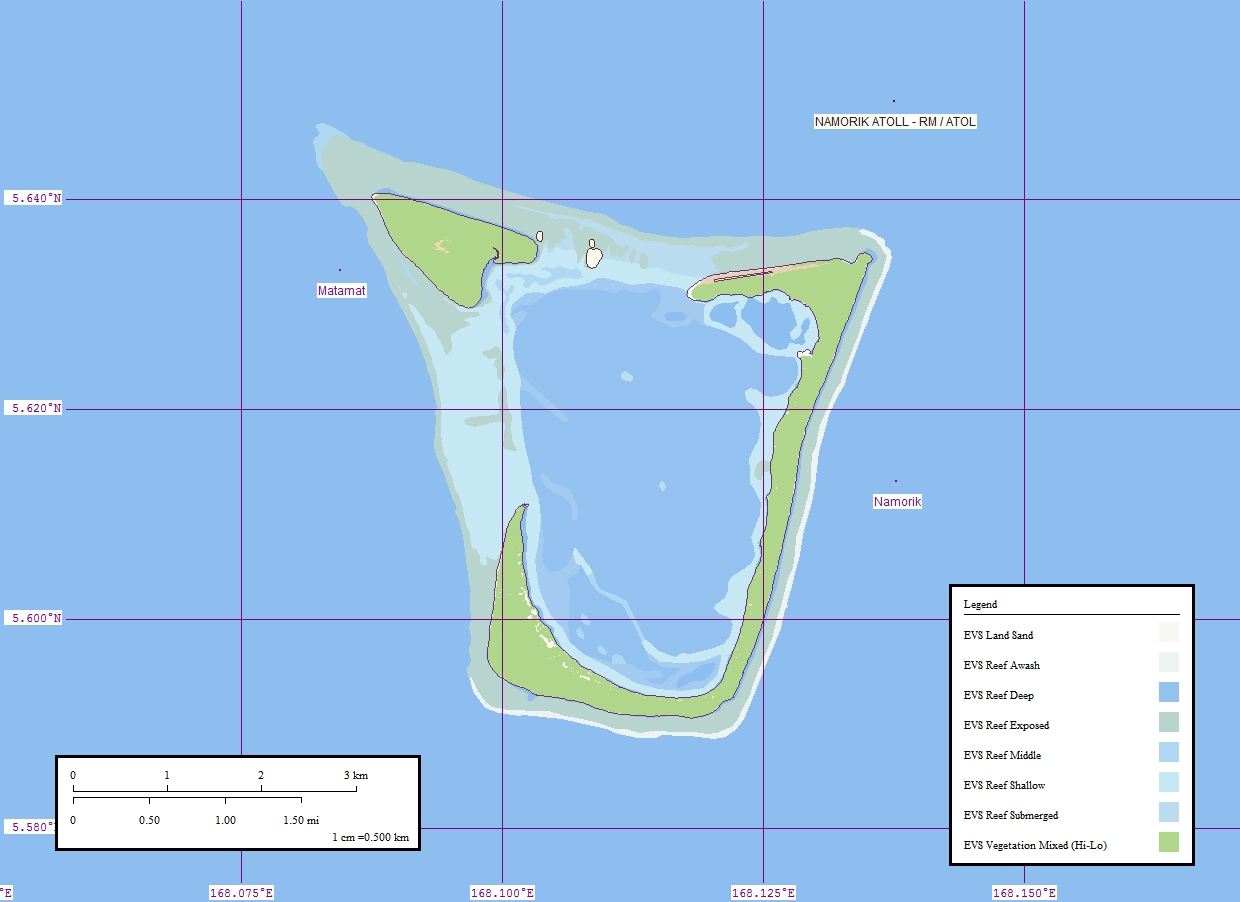
Namorik Atoll MH: Marplot Map (1:50,000)

Flag of Namdrik Atoll

Namdrik Atoll or Namorik Atoll (Marshallese: Naṃdik, [nʲɑmˠ(wi)rʲik]) is a coral atoll of two islands in the Pacific Ocean, and forms a legislative district of the Ralik Chain of the Marshall Islands. Its total land area is only 2.8 square kilometers (1.1 sq mi), but it encloses a lagoon with an area of 8.4 square kilometers (3.2 sq mi). The atoll had a population of 299 at the 2021 census. It is located approximately 145 kilometers (90 mi) west-southwest of Jaluit, and 117 kilometers (73 mi) northwest of Ebon Atoll.

== Geography ==
Namdrik Atoll consists of two wooded islands with a reef flat lying between them. The larger island (also called Namorik) wraps around the central lagoon from the southwest to the northeast, while the smaller island closes off the northwest corner of the lagoon. A coral islet stands between them on the reef, with numerous black boulders. The very shallow lagoon is cut off from the sea by the drying coral reef. Boats can cross the reef with difficulty, at high water on the west side of the atoll.

Landing near the west side of Namorik Islet can be effected about 90 m south of it. There is no shelter during northeast winds, and it is dangerous with strong southwest winds when there is a heavy sea. There is a fringing reef which extends about 135 m in the vicinity of the landing place. There is a depth of about 1.2 m and there are rocks in places. Two stranded wrecks lie about 90 m off the south shore along the reef line. (Sailing Directions Pub-153)

Freshwater is provided by a subterranean Ghyben-Herzberg water lens underneath the islands which is replenished by rainfall. There are no navigable passes into the central lagoon, and it is largely undisturbed by human activity. The atoll supports a mangrove forest that is home to 150 species of fish, and supports breeding populations of critically endangered turtle species. In 2012, the Government of the Marshall Islands designated the atoll as its second Wetland of International Importance and developed a conservation management plan to prevent unsustainable harvesting in the area.

== History ==
In 1835, the captain and crew of the Whaling Ship Awashonks were killed by Namdrik Islanders. Namdrik Atoll was claimed by the German Empire along with the rest of the Marshall Islands in 1885. After World War I, the island came under the South Seas Mandate of the Empire of Japan. Following the end of World War II, it came under the control of the United States as part of the Trust Territory of the Pacific Islands until the independence of the Marshall Islands in 1986.

Namdrik Atoll has a population of approximately 500. It is the smallest inhabited atoll in the Marshall Islands and consists of just two islands, Namdrik and Matemat. There are three churches, and one elementary school with approximately 200 students. The school employs about 9 teachers (K-8) and usually has a World Teach volunteer teacher to teach English as a Second Language. The atoll has an airstrip that receives an Air Marshall Islands flight once or twice a fortnight. Namdrik Atoll recently invested in pearl farming in the lagoon, and has received a grant from AusAid to buy machinery that turns copra into coconut oil. There is one truck on Namdrik that transports coconuts from around the island to the dock. There was no fighting on Namdrik Atoll during World War II.

Most buildings on Namdrik are powered by solar power, though there are a few generators on-island. A supply boat stops at Namdrik every month or two, with the large 'Field Trip Ships' usually stopping three times in a year. Ships cannot enter Namdrik's lagoon without banking on a reef, so unloading ships need to wait 'ocean side' for small Namdrik boats to travel between ship and shore to load and unload all of the goods.

Namdrik Atoll made international headlines in November 2011 when two fishermen from Kiribati turned up alive on the island after drifting for thirty-three days at sea.

The mayor of Namdrik Atoll is Mr Clarence Luther. The recently deceased senator for Namdrik Atoll was Mattlan Zackhras.

== Education ==
Marshall Islands Public School System operates Namdrik Elementary School. Students are zoned to Jaluit High School in Jaluit Atoll.
