= Namu Atoll =

Atoll in the Marshall Islands

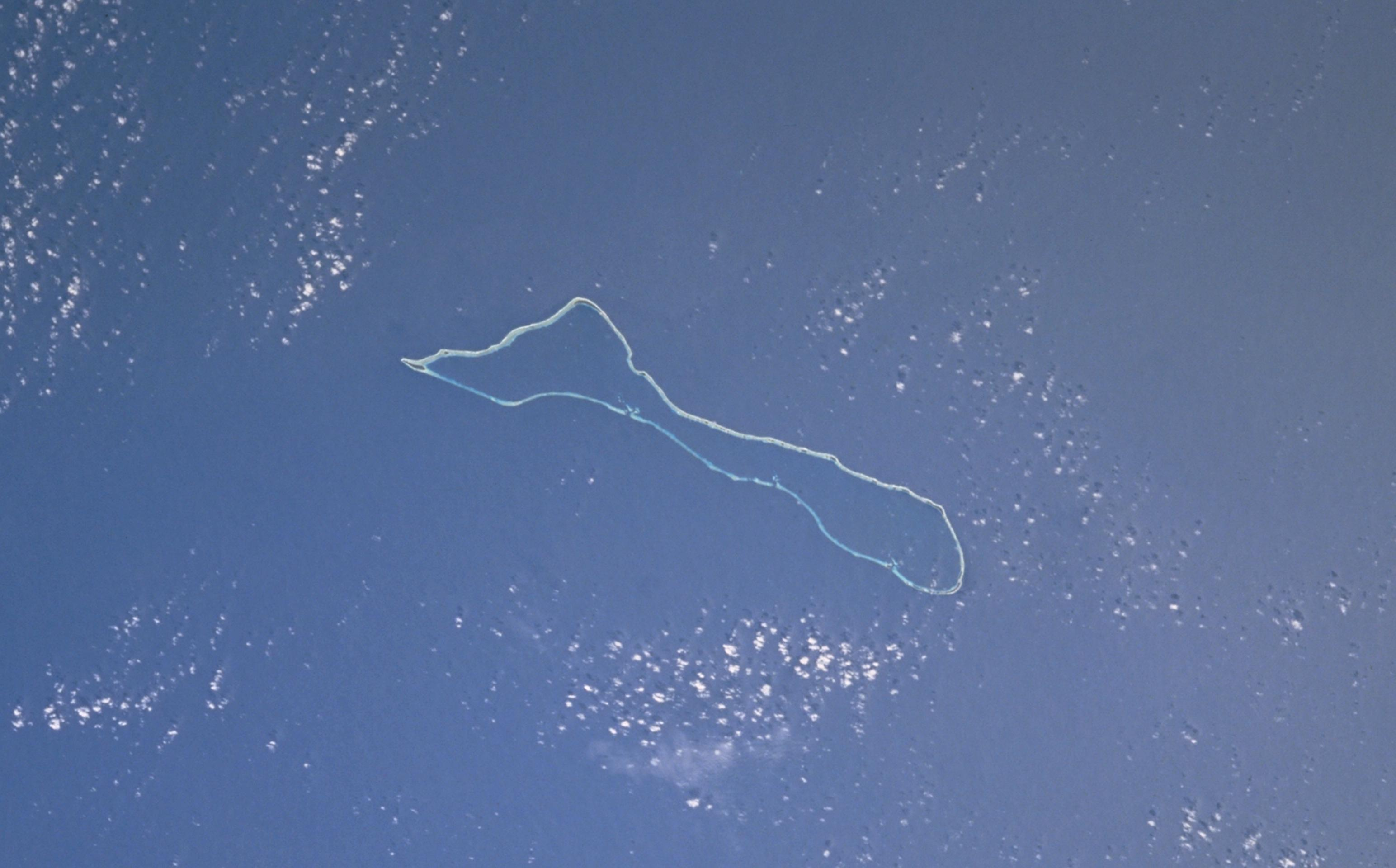
- NASA picture of Namu Atoll

- Namu Atoll in the Republic of the Marshall Islands

- Location within Marshall Islands

Geography
- Location: North Pacific
- Coordinates: 07°59′00″N 168°10′25″E
- Archipelago: Ralik
- Total islands: 51
- Area: 6.27 km^{2} (2.42 sq mi)
- Highest elevation: 3 m (10 ft)

Administration
- (Marshall Islands)

Demographics
- Population: 525 (2021)
- Ethnic groups: Marshallese

Namu Atoll (Marshallese: Naṃo, [nʲɑmˠo]) is a coral atoll of 54 islands in the Pacific Ocean, and forms a legislative district of the Ralik Chain of the Marshall Islands. Its total land area is only 6.27 square kilometers (2.42 sq mi), but that encloses a lagoon of 397 square kilometers (153 sq mi). It is located approximately 62 kilometers (39 mi) south-southwest of Kwajalein Atoll.

There are four main population centres, the islands of Namu, Majkin, Loen and Mae. The population of Namu Atoll was 525 at the 2021 census.

== History ==
The Spanish expedition of Álvaro de Mendaña made the first recorded sighting by Europeans of Namu Atoll on 17 September 1568. The pilot, Hernán Gallego, mistook it for San Bartolome (Bokak Atoll), which Toribio Alonso de Salazar had seen in 1526, although Bokak was a long way to the north. Mendaña says they named them San Mateo Shoals. The islands were inhabited, with many houses. A landing party found a chisel made of a nail and pieces of rope which were presumably gifts left there on 3 July 1566 by the galleon San Jerónimo, then commanded by the rebel pilot Lope Martín. Captain Thomas Dennet of the British vessel Britannia sighted the atoll in 1797 on route from Australia to China and named it Ross Island.

The German Empire claimed Namu Atoll along with the rest of the Marshall Islands in 1885. After World War I, the island came under the South Seas Mandate of the Empire of Japan. The base became part of the vast US Naval Base Marshall Islands. Following the end of World War II, it came under the control of the United States as part of the Trust Territory of the Pacific Islands until 1986 when the Marshall Islands achieved their independence.

== Education ==
Marshall Islands Public School System operates public schools:

- Loen Elementary School
- Mae Elementary School
- Majkin Elementary School
- Namo Elementary School

Students are zoned to Jaluit High School in Jaluit Atoll.

In the 1994–1995 school year Namu had one private high school.
