= Ujae Atoll =

Atoll in the Marshall Islands

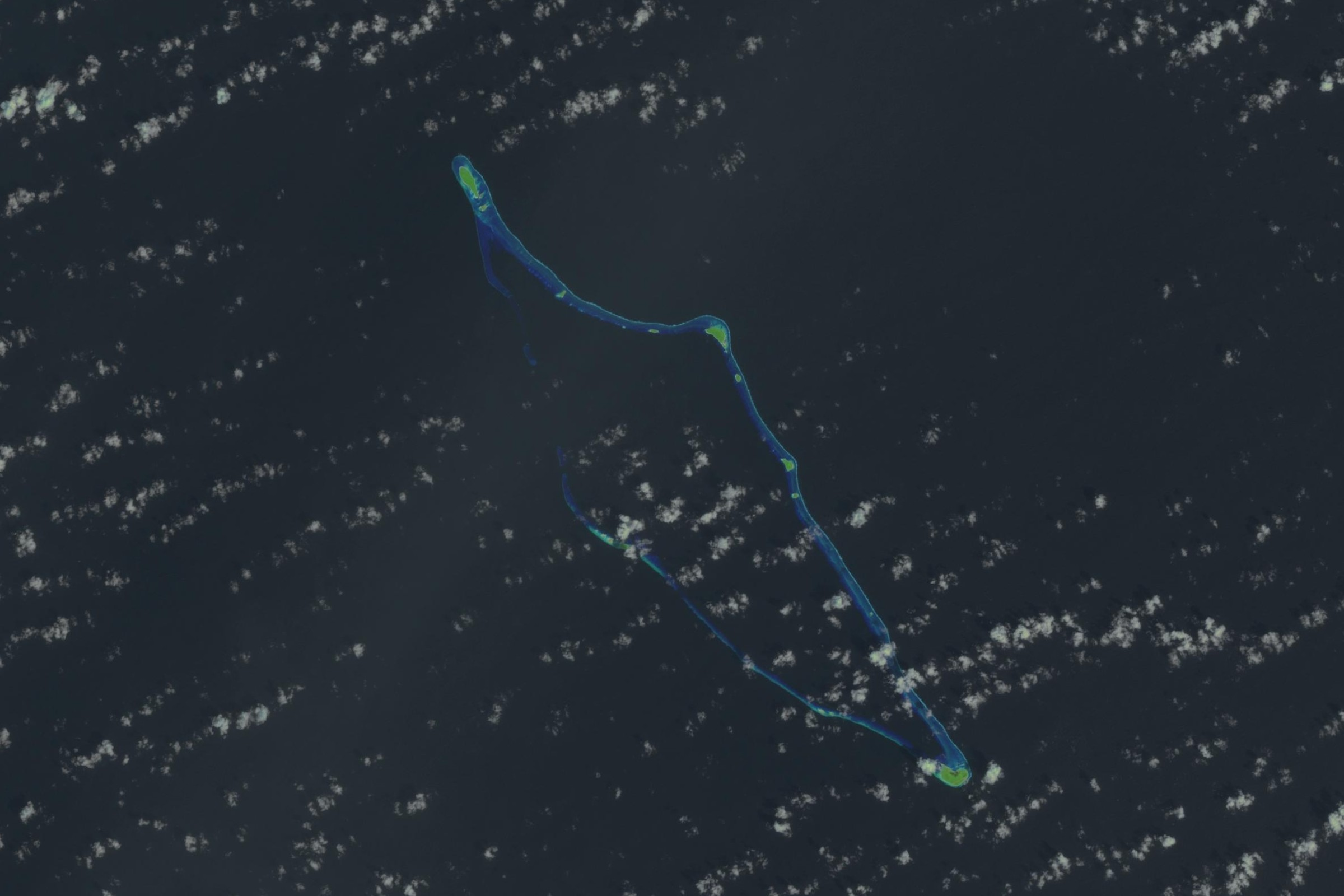
- NASA picture of Ujae Atoll

- Map of Ujae in the Marshall Islands

- Location within Marshall Islands

Geography
- Location: North Pacific Ocean
- Coordinates: 09°03′00″N 165°39′00″E
- Archipelago: Ralik
- Total islands: 14
- Area: 1.86 km^{2} (0.72 sq mi)
- Highest elevation: 3 m (10 ft)

Administration
- Marshall Islands

Demographics
- Population: 310 (2021)
- Ethnic groups: Marshallese

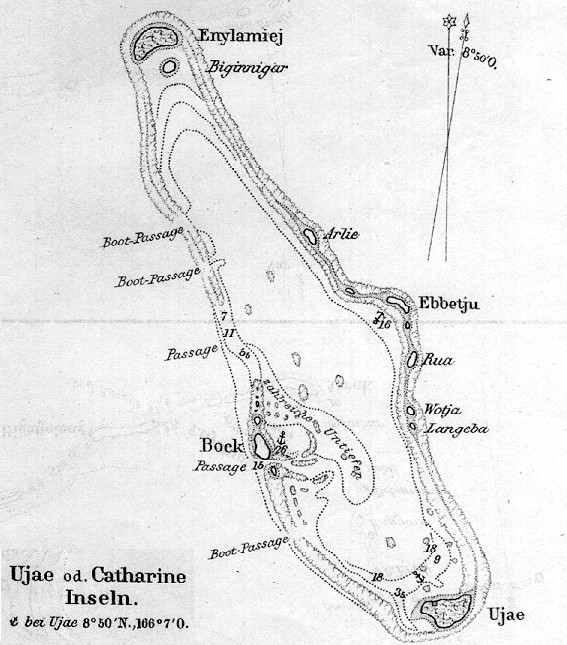
1881 map of Ujae Island

Flag of Ujae Atoll

Ujae Atoll (Marshallese: Wūjae or Ujae, [wɯzʲɑːɛ]) is a coral atoll of 15 islands in the Pacific Ocean, and forms a legislative district of the Ralik Chain of the Marshall Islands. Its total land area is only 1.86 square kilometers (0.72 sq mi), but it encloses a lagoon of 185.94 square kilometers (71.79 sq mi). It is located about 122 kilometers (76 mi) west of Kwajalein Atoll.

== History ==
In folklore, the Marshallese people have long considered the island to be home to timon (demons).

Its first recorded sighting was by the Spanish expedition of Álvaro de Saavedra on 21 September 1529. Another sighting was reported by the Spanish expedition of Ruy López de Villalobos in January 1543.

In 1885, the German Empire claimed Ujae Atoll along with the rest of the Marshall Islands. After World War I, the island came under the South Seas Mandate of the Empire of Japan. The island became part of the vast US Naval Base Marshall Islands. Following the end of World War II, it came under the control of the United States as part of the Trust Territory of the Pacific Islands until the independence of the Marshall Islands in 1986.

The population of Ujae Atoll was 310 at the 2021 census.

== Education ==
Marshall Islands Public School System operates Ujae Elementary School. Kwajalein Atoll High School on Kwajalein serves the community.

== Transportation ==
Ujae Airport is a public use airstrip on Ujae Island.
