= Wotho Atoll =

Coral atoll in the Marshall Islands

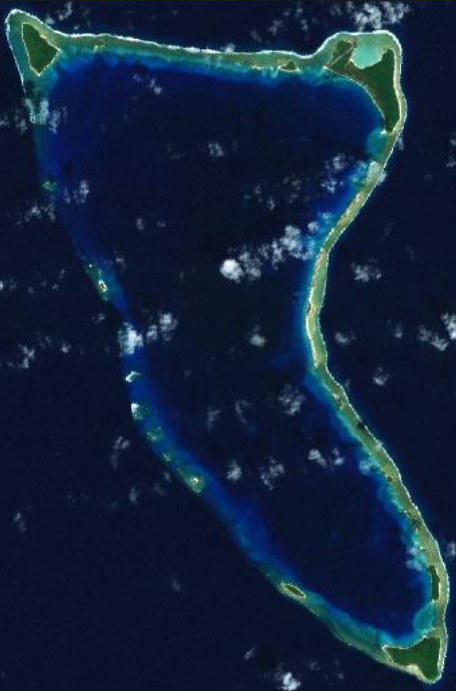
- NASA picture of Wotho Atoll

- Wotho Atoll (Marshall Islands)

- Location within Marshall Islands

Geography
- Location: North Pacific
- Coordinates: 10°05′00″N 165°50′00″E
- Archipelago: Ralik
- Total islands: 13
- Area: 4.33 km^{2} (1.67 sq mi)
- Highest elevation: 3 m (10 ft)

Administration
- Marshall Islands

Demographics
- Population: 88 (2021)
- Ethnic groups: Marshallese

Wotho Atoll (Marshallese: Wōtto, [wʌttˠɔ]) is a coral atoll of 13 islands in the Pacific Ocean, and forms a legislative district of the Ralik Chain of the Marshall Islands. Its total land area is only 4.33 square kilometers (1.67 sq mi), but it encloses a lagoon of 94.92 square kilometers (36.65 sq mi). The name "Wotho" means either "entrance through the reef", or "island far away" according to different sources.

The population of Wotho Atoll was 88 at the 2021 census.

== History ==
First recorded sighting of Wotho Atoll by Europeans was by the Spanish expedition of Miguel López de Legazpi on 12 January 1565. They were charted as Las Hermanas (The Sisters in Spanish). It is likely that it had been visited earlier, in between December 1542 and January 1543, by the Spanish expedition of Ruy López de Villalobos. The atoll was later also known as Schantz Islands after Johan Eberhard von Schantz, who rediscovered the islands on his circumnavigation of the globe on the Imperial Russian Navy ship America in 1835. Wotho Atoll was claimed by the German Empire along with the rest of the Marshall Islands in 1885. After World War I, the island came under the South Seas Mandate of the Empire of Japan. At the end of World War II, it came under the control of the United States as part of the Trust Territory of the Pacific Islands until the independence of the Marshall Islands in 1986.

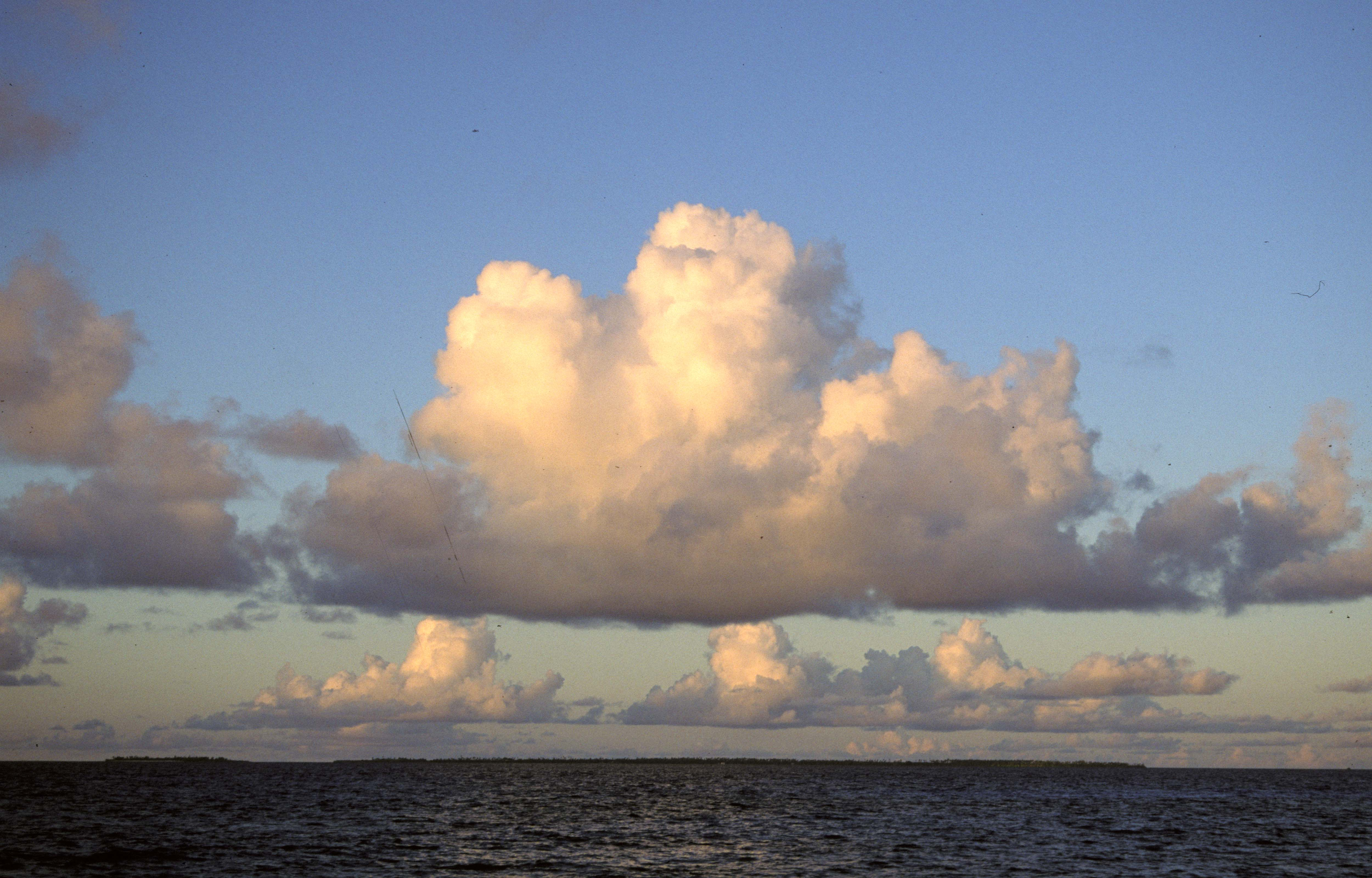
Sunset from Wotho Atoll

Flag of Wotho Atoll

== Education ==
Marshall Islands Public School System operates Wotho Elementary School. Kwajalein Atoll High School on Kwajalein serves the community.
