= Wotje Atoll =

Marshallese atoll in the Pacific

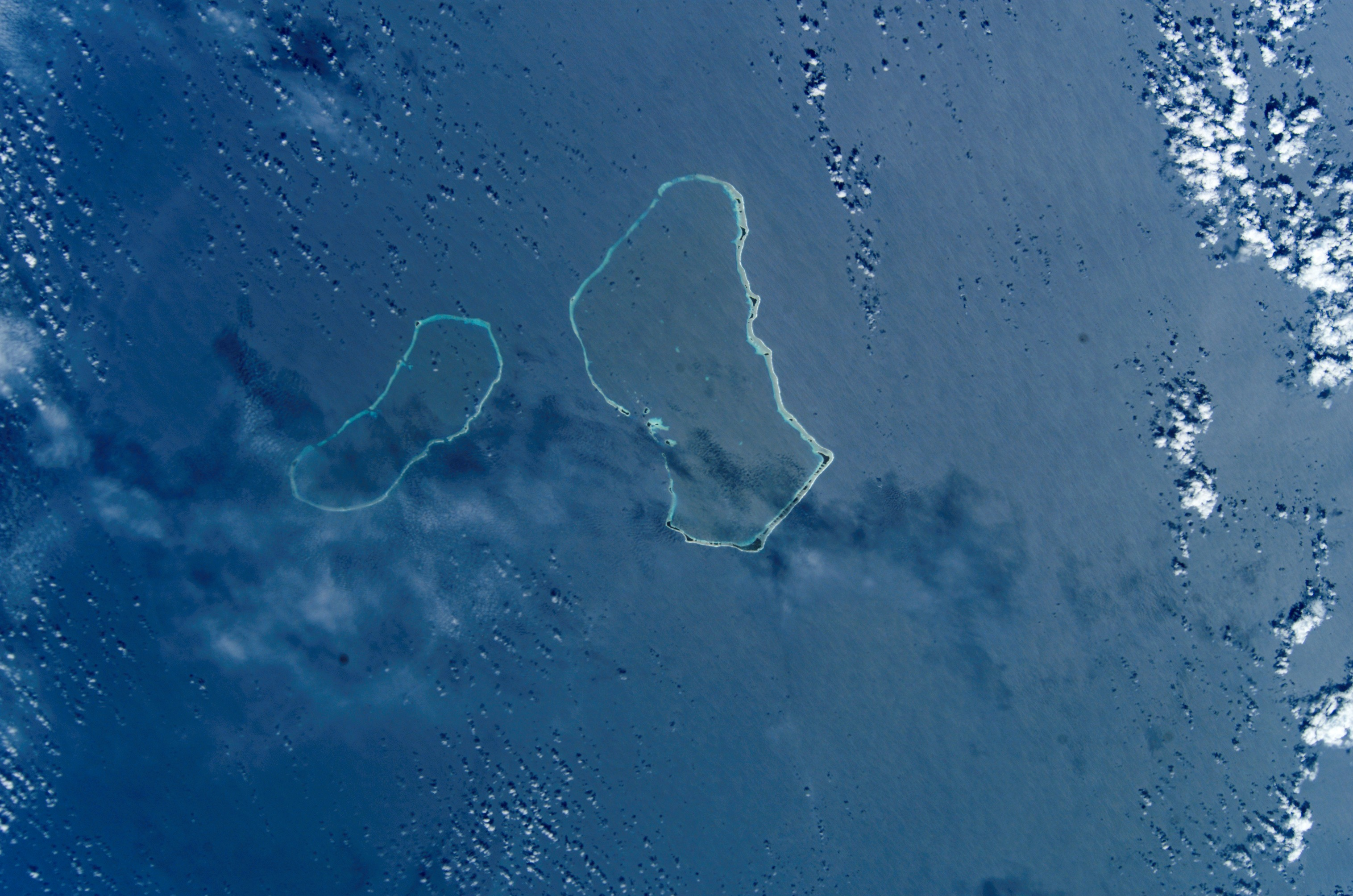
- NASA picture of Erikub and Wotje Atolls

- Wotje Atoll (Marshall Islands)

- Location within Marshall Islands

Geography
- Location: North Pacific
- Coordinates: 09°26′30″N 170°01′00″E
- Archipelago: Ratak
- Total islands: 75
- Area: 8.18 km^{2} (3.16 sq mi)
- Highest elevation: 3 m (10 ft)

Administration
- Marshall Islands

Demographics
- Population: 816 (2021)
- Ethnic groups: Marshallese

Wotje Atoll (Marshallese: Wōjjā, [wʌttʲæ]) is a coral atoll of 75 islands in the Pacific Ocean, and forms a legislative district of the Ratak Chain of the Marshall Islands.

== Geography ==
Wotje's land area of 8.18 square kilometers (3.16 sq mi) is one of the largest in the Marshall Islands, and encloses a lagoon of 624 square kilometers (241 sq mi). The atoll is oriented east and west and is 45 kilometers (28 mi) at its longest point, and 18 kilometers (11 mi) at its greatest width. As of 2007, the population was nearly 1,000, which included about 200 teenagers who live on the island at the public boarding school, Northern Islands High School. The population of the atoll was 816 at the 2021 census. The Wotje Atoll includes a number of islets, including Wotje (the largest), Bodao, Enejeltalk, Ukon, Wetwirok, Kaiken, Wormej, Kimajo, Ninum, Kaben. About 125 people live on Wodmej, which is approximately 8 miles from the main island of Wotje. All other islands are uninhabited and are used only for copra production, picnics, and food gathering.

== History ==
First recorded sighting by Europeans was by the Spanish expedition of Ruy López de Villalobos on 25 December 1542 that charted it as Los Corales (The Coral Islands in Spanish) because of the many corals and having anchored in these. One of the islets of this atoll was charted as San Esteban by Villalobos because they landed on it on St. Stephen's day (26 December 1542).

Wotje Atoll was claimed by the German Empire along with the rest of the Marshall Islands in 1885. After World War I, the island came under the South Seas Mandate of the Empire of Japan. The Japanese established a school on the island, which served the atolls of the Ratak Chain, but otherwise left the administration in the hands of local authorities.

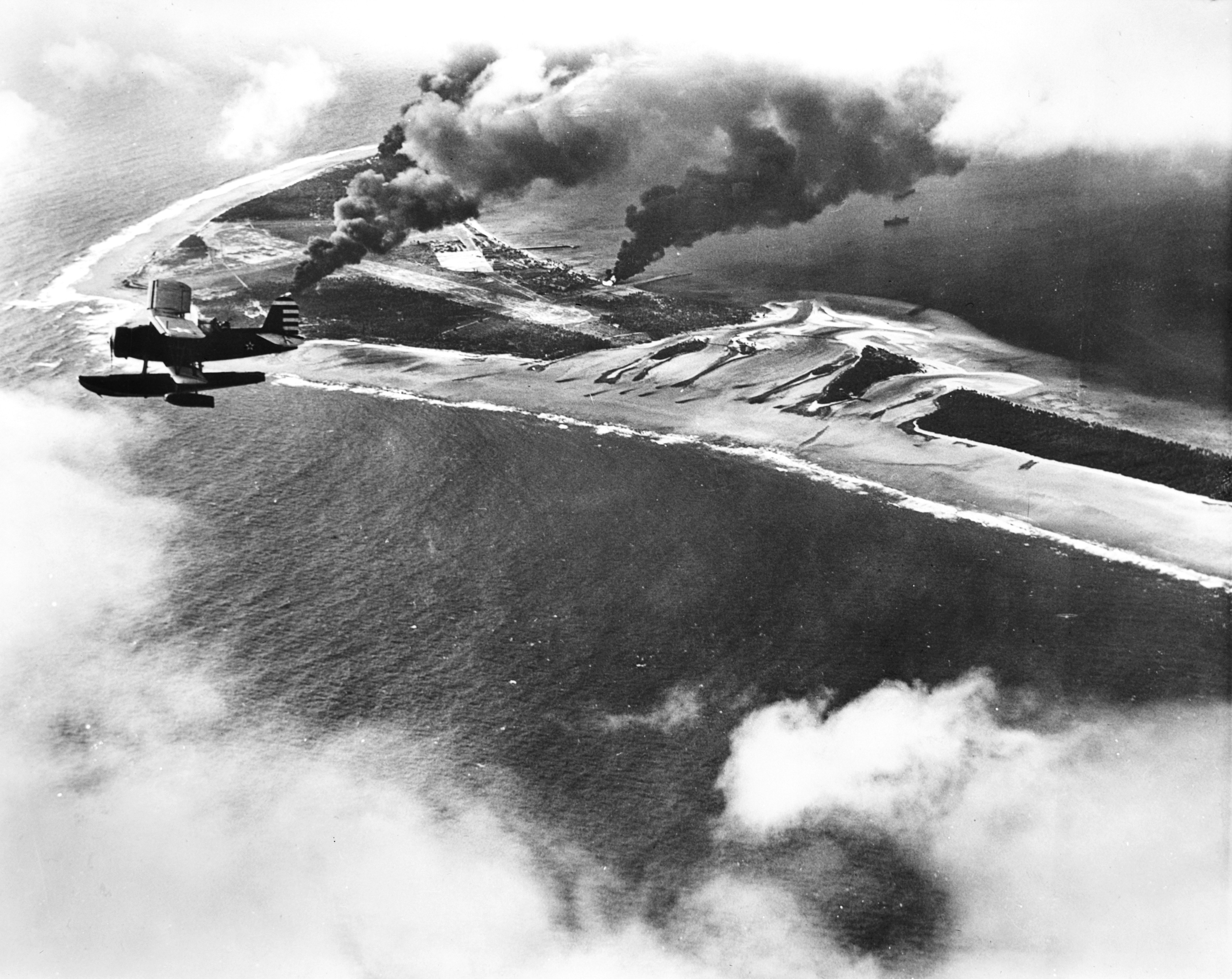
Wotje Atoll, Feb 1942

However, from the end of the 1930s, Wotje was developed as into a major Japanese seaplane base, and also had an airfield with two runways for land-based aircraft, and several hundred support buildings. During World War II the atoll was garrisoned by the Japanese. The coasts were heavily fortified with coastal artillery and anti-aircraft batteries. The only bombing of Hawaii after Pearl Harbor was executed by seaplanes from Wotje. The Japanese garrison at Wotje at its peak numbered 2,959 men from the Imperial Japanese Navy, 424 men from the Imperial Japanese Army and some 750 civilian workers, many of whom were conscripted ethnic Koreans. From mid-1943 the island came under attack by United States Navy carrier-based aircraft and was frequently shelled by warships. The attacks increased in frequency and severity after the fall of Majuro and Kwajalein to American forces, and all supply lines to Wotje were cut. By the surrender of Japan, only 1244 men of the garrison remained alive.

Following the end of World War II, Wotje came under the control of the United States as part of the Trust Territory of the Pacific Islands until the independence of the Marshall Islands in 1986. Many World War II artifacts remain on the main island of Wotje, including a large concrete airstrip, bunkers and heavy artillery.

== Climate ==
Climate data for Wotje
Month	Jan	Feb	Mar	Apr	May	Jun	Jul	Aug	Sep	Oct	Nov	Dec	Year
Mean daily maximum °C (°F)	29 (84)	30 (86)	30 (86)	30 (86)	30 (86)	30 (86)	30 (86)	30 (86)	30 (86)	30 (86)	30 (86)	29 (84)	29 (84)
Mean daily minimum °C (°F)	25 (77)	25 (77)	25 (77)	25 (77)	25 (77)	25 (77)	25 (77)	25 (77)	25 (77)	25 (77)	25 (77)	25 (77)	25 (77)
Average precipitation mm (inches)	110 (4.3)	76 (3)	110 (4.5)	180 (7.1)	240 (9.3)	240 (9.6)	250 (10)	260 (10.4)	290 (11.4)	290 (11.6)	290 (11.3)	210 (8.1)	2,550 (100.5)
Source: Weatherbase

== Education ==
Marshall Islands Public School System operates public schools.

Primary schools:

- Wodmej Elementary School
- Wotje Elementary School
- St. Thomas Elementary School (managed by Catholic Maryknoll Sisters) [Closed in June 2012]

High schools:

- Northern Islands High School

Higher Education

- College of the Marshall Islands extension campus [broke ground in 2020]

== Religion ==
There are four churches on Wotje: Catholic, Protestant, Assembly of God, and Full Gospel. Additionally, there are a small number of Latter-Day Saints who live on the atoll.

== Transport ==
Wotje is serviced by ships several times a year which transport food supplies. In addition, the local government and senator manage a small ship, Northern Star, which makes more frequent trips. Air services are provided by Air Marshall Islands to Wotje Airport.
