= Manchester (disambiguation) =

Manchester is a city in the North West of England.

Manchester may also refer to:

== Places ==
=== In England ===
- Greater Manchester, a metropolitan county and combined authority area in northwest England
- Greater Manchester Urban Area, the large conurbation that encompasses much of Greater Manchester
- Greater Manchester Statutory City Region, Greater Manchester and five boroughs
- Anglican Diocese of Manchester
- Manchester (ancient parish), an ancient ecclesiastical parish
  - Manchester (ancient township), a townships in the ancient parish
- Manchester (HM Prison), a men's prison (commonly called "Strangeways") in Manchester
- Manchester (UK Parliament constituency), 1654–1660 and 1832–1885

=== In the United States ===
- Manchester, California, a census-designated place
- Manchester, Monterey County, California, a ghost town
- Manchester, Connecticut, a town
  - Manchester (CDP), Connecticut, the urban portion of the town
- Manchester, Georgia, a town
- Manchester, Illinois, a village
- Manchester, Indiana, an unincorporated community and census-designated place
- Manchester, Iowa, a city
- Manchester, Kansas, a city
- Manchester, Kentucky, a home rule-class city
- Manchester, Maine, a town
- Manchester, Maryland, a town
- Manchester-by-the-Sea, Massachusetts, often referred to as just "Manchester"
- Manchester, Michigan, a city
- Manchester, Minnesota, a city
- Manchester, Missouri, a city
- Manchester, New Hampshire, the largest place called Manchester in the US and largest city in New Hampshire
- Manchester, New Jersey, a town, often referred to as "Manchester Township"
- Manchester, New York, a town
  - Manchester (village), New York
- Manchester, Ohio, a village
- Manchester, Oklahoma, a town
- Manchester, Pennsylvania, a borough
- Manchester (Pittsburgh), a neighborhood in Pittsburgh, Pennsylvania
- Manchester, South Dakota, an unincorporated community
- Manchester, Tennessee, a city
- Manchester, Houston, Texas
- Manchester, Vermont, a town
  - Manchester (village), Vermont, within the town
- Manchester, Richmond, Virginia, a former city, now part of Richmond
- Manchester, Chesterfield County, Virginia, a census-designated place
- Manchester, Washington, an unincorporated community and census-designated place
- Manchester, Green Lake County, Wisconsin, a town
  - Manchester (community), Green Lake County, Wisconsin, an unincorporated community within the town
- Manchester, Jackson County, Wisconsin, a town
- Roman Catholic Diocese of Manchester, New Hampshire
- Manchester Township (disambiguation)
- Federal Correctional Institution, Manchester, a medium-security federal prison for men in Clay County, Kentucky

=== Elsewhere ===
- County of Manchester, Australia, a cadastral unit in South Australia
- Manchester, Bolivia, a town
- Manchester, Calgary, Canada, a neighbourhood
- Manchester, Nova Scotia, Canada, a small community
- Manchester Parish, Jamaica
- Manchester, Suriname, a settlement

== Military ==
- Avro 533 Manchester, a twin-engine biplane photo-reconnaissance and bomber aircraft of 1918
- Avro Manchester, a twin-engine heavy bomber used by the RAF during World War II
- HMS Manchester, three ships of the Royal Navy
- USS Manchester, two ships of the US Navy
- Manchester Regiment, also known as The Manchesters, a British Army regiment

== Music ==
- Manchester (album), an album by Tim Barry
- "Manchester" (song), a 2006 song by the Beautiful South
- "Manchester" (The Times song), a 1990 single by The Times

== People ==
- Manchester (surname)
- Manchester Boddy (1891–1967), American newspaper publisher
- Duke of Manchester or Earl of Manchester, a title of the Peerage of the UK from 1626 to date
- Manchester Band of Pomo Indians of the Manchester Rancheria, a federally recognized Native American tribe in California

== Schools ==
- University of Manchester, an institution of higher education in England
- Victoria University of Manchester, usually referred to as the University of Manchester, a predecessor of the current University of Manchester
- Manchester University (Indiana), a private liberal arts university in Indiana, US
- Manchester Community College (Connecticut), US
- Manchester Community College (New Hampshire), US
- Manchester High School (disambiguation)
- Manchester Grammar School, Manchester, England, the largest private day school for boys in the UK
- Manchester Academy (disambiguation)
- Manchester School of Acting, a drama college in Manchester, England
- Manchester School of Architecture in Manchester, England
- Manchester School of Technology, a school in Manchester, New Hampshire
- Manchester GATE, an elementary school in Fresno, California, US

== Science and technology ==
- Manchester cloth, also known as corduroy
- Manchester code, an electronic transmission method used for communication
- Manchester Mark 1, an early British computer
- Manchester score, a system of assessing small-cell lung cancer
- Manchester, the name of a variant of the Athlon 64 X2 CPU

== Sports ==
=== Football ===
==== Premier League ====
- Manchester City F.C.
- Manchester United F.C.
  - Manchester United (video game series)

==== Other ====
- Manchester F.C. (disambiguation), several teams

=== Ice hockey ===
- Manchester Monarchs (AHL), operated 2001–2015 in New Hampshire, US
- Manchester Monarchs (ECHL), operated 2015–2019 in New Hampshire, US
- Manchester Phoenix, operated 2003–2017 in England
- Manchester Storm (1995–2002), in England
- Manchester Storm (2015), in England

=== Other sports ===
- Manchester Silkworms, a collegiate baseball team in Connecticut, US
- Manchester Rugby Club, in England

== Transport ==
=== Airports ===
- Manchester Airport, near Manchester, England
- Manchester Airport (US), in Manchester, New Hampshire, U.S., renamed in 2006
- Manchester Airport (disambiguation), several airports with similar names

=== Bus stations ===
- Manchester station (Los Angeles Metro), US

=== Rail stations ===
- Manchester Piccadilly station, the principal railway station in Manchester, England
- Manchester Oxford Road railway station, the second busiest railway station in Manchester, England
- Manchester Victoria station, the third busiest railway station in Manchester, England
- Manchester station group, a station group of four railway stations in Manchester, England
- Manchester station (MBTA), in Massachusetts, US
- Manchester Union Station, in New Hampshire, US, closed in 1967

=== Other transport ===
- Manchester Ship Canal, an inland waterway in England linking Manchester to the Irish Sea
- Manchester (barque), a four-masted British barque
- Manchester Road (disambiguation)

== Other uses ==
- "Manchester" (The West Wing), a two-part episodes of the show
- Manchester Black, a DC Comics antihero later turned supervillain
- Manchester Terrier, a breed of dog
- Manchester (cigarette), a UAE-based cigarette brand
- Manchester, a term used in Australia, New Zealand and South Africa for bedding and linens

== See also ==
- Manchester school (disambiguation)
- Manchester Pals, World War I Army regiments formed by Lord Kitchener
- "Manchester, England", a song from Hair
- Manchester–Boston Regional Airport (MHT), near Manchester, New Hampshire, US
- Alyth/Bonnybrook/Manchester, Calgary, a neighbourhood in Calgary, Alberta
- Madchester, a musical genre
