= Manchester school =

Manchester school may refer to:

== Academics ==
- Manchester Liberalism, also called the Manchester School, a socio-economic and political movement of the 19th century
- The Manchester School (journal), an academic journal of economics
- Manchester school (anthropology), a school of thought in anthropology

== Arts and entertainment ==
- Manchester School (writers), a term applied to a number of playwrights in Manchester, England, in the early 20th century
- The Manchester School (New Music Manchester), a 1950s group of composers and performers in Manchester, England

== Educational institutions ==
- Manchester School of Acting, a drama college in Manchester, England
- Manchester School of Architecture in Manchester, England
- Manchester High School (disambiguation)
- Manchester School of Technology, a high school in Manchester, New Hampshire
- Manchester Grammar School, an independent school for boys in Manchester, England
- Manchester GATE, an elementary school in Fresno, California, United States
