= Scruples (disambiguation) =

Scruples is a synonym for conscience.

Scruple(s) may also refer to:

- Scruples (novel), by Judith Krantz, 1978
  - Scruples (miniseries), 1980, based on the novel
- Scruples (comic strip), by Joseph Young, Jr.
- Scruples (game), a card game based on ethical dilemmas.
- Scruple (unit) (℈), a small unit of mass in the apothecaries' system

== See also ==
- Skrupel, a Norwegian unit of length
- Scrupulosity
- Maigret Has Scruples, a 1958 novel
