= Manchester Township, Pennsylvania =

Manchester Township is the name of some places in the U.S. state of Pennsylvania:

- Manchester Township, Wayne County, Pennsylvania
- Manchester Township, York County, Pennsylvania

== See also ==
- East Manchester Township, York County, Pennsylvania
- West Manchester Township, York County, Pennsylvania
- Manchester Township (disambiguation)
