= Manchester Airport (disambiguation) =

Manchester Airport is an international airport in Ringway, Manchester, England.

Manchester Airport may also refer to:

== United Kingdom ==
- Trafford Park Aerodrome (Manchester), in operation 1911–1918
- Alexandra Park Aerodrome (Manchester), in operation 1918–1924
- Woodford Aerodrome or Manchester Woodford Aerodrome, a private aerodrome in Stockport, England, in operation 1924–2011
- Manchester (Wythenshawe) Aerodrome, the first municipally owned airport at Manchester, 1929–1930
- Manchester Barton Aerodrome, a general aviation airport in Salford, England, in operation since 1930

== United States ==
- Manchester Airport, a public airport in Manchester, New Hampshire, renamed as Manchester–Boston Regional Airport in 2006

== See also ==
- Manchester (disambiguation)
