= Tang Sauce =

American rapper

- Born: John Manselle-Young; August 24, 1991 (age 34); Hartford, CT
- Genres: Hip hop, Jazz, Spoken Word
- Occupations: Rapper, dancer, producer, multi-instrumentalist, actor
- Instruments: vocals, guitar, keyboards, piano, trumpet, cornet
- Years active: 2008–present
- Website: bangdollatang.bandcamp.com

John Manselle-Young otherwise known as Tang Sauce is an American hip-hop recording artist, songwriter, dancer, instrumentalist, and actor. He is currently on the MaTourity Tour in support of his debut mixtape Maturity.

== Life and career ==
Tang Sauce was born and raised in Hartford, CT. He is the son of noted cartoonist, author, and filmmaker Joe Young and Leslie Manselle. He has two brothers and one sister. He learned to play the cornet at the age of eleven and eventually picked up the guitar and piano in high school. He attended the Artist Collective in Hartford to study Jazz and tap dance, becoming a member of the Youth Jazz Ensemble, and attended and graduated from Manchester High School, where he also was a member of the schools' Jazz ensemble. While a student at Capital Community College, he continued to build on his talents in dancing, rapping, and acting, citing as his inspiration Lil Wayne, LL Cool J, Will Smith and Nick Cannon for his early hip-hop influences, as well as Lee Morgan, Kenny Dorham, Kid David, Meghus, and Sidney Poitier for performance. A chance viewing of the dance film You Got Served compelled him to take dancing seriously, which he immersed himself in the fundamentals of breakdancing, eventually getting cast as a dancer in a production of The Wiz. Further appearances in Hartford Stage and Neighborhood Studios collaborations of A Midsummer Night's Dream and A Raisin In the Sun helped fuel his confidence, but he preferred to pursue hip-hop, first touring around Hartford performing his blend of old-school, positive hip-hop, often cited as a throwback to early rap artists KRS-One and Wu-Tang Clan, where he would eventually acquire his moniker. He made appearances at the annual Trinity International Hip Hop Festival, eventually hosting the event, the Springfield Jazz Roots Festival, and the Shrine World Music Venue. After a brief appearance in a Jidenna music video "Knickers" as a trumpeter and a collaborative effort with the collective OflowShow and artist Bill Blacks entitled Azanto America, Tang Sauce went into the studio to record what would be his debut mixtape Maturity. Released February 27, 2016, it received positive reviews and spawned the singles and music videos "One Time For Your Mind", "Good Ol' Days", and "Ego-Trippin'". Following those releases, Tang Sauce kicked off the New England leg of his MaTourity and appeared in AfroPunk 2017 as part of the battle of the bands, and will appear on August 11, 2017 as a Top 4 finalist. In 2018, Tang Sauce released his next project "Seniority", which was accompanied by a one-act play starring Tang Sauces' title character. In 2020 he starred in a tv show streaming on Amazon Prime produced by his father entitled All In: The Family where he plays the role of Kevin.
