= Paul J. Turek =

American physician (born 1960)

Paul Turek
- Paul Turek in 2009
- Born: July 8, 1960 (age 66); Manchester, Connecticut, USA
- Education: Yale College, New Haven, CT
- Occupations: Physician, TV Personality and Medical Expert on Men's Reproductive Health
- Known for: FNA Mapping, Men's Fertility Research, and Male Reproductive Health
- Scientific career
- Workplaces: Men's Reproductive Health Clinical Research Center; The Turek Clinic
- Website: http://www.theturekclinic.com

Dr. Paul J Turek (born July 8, 1960, Manchester, Connecticut) is an American physician and surgeon, men's reproductive health specialist, and businessman. Turek is a recent recipient of a National Institutes of Health (NIH) grant for research designed to help infertile men become fathers using stem cells.

== Early life ==
Turek was born in Manchester, Connecticut, to immigrant parents. His mother was the administrative secretary in the Manchester public school system, while his father was a sheet metal mechanic and welder. He attended Manchester High School and graduated salutatorian in 1978.

== Education and Training ==
At Yale College he graduated summa cum laude, Phi Beta Kappa, received the Henry J. Belknap Prize in the Biological Sciences, and co-authored several scientific publications from work in the laboratory of Dr. Robert Handschumacher in the Department of Pharmacology at the Yale School of Medicine. While at Stanford Medical School, he participated in immunology research and developed an interest in the surgical discipline of urology. He pursued his internship and residency training in urology at the Hospital of the University of Pennsylvania. During this time, he developed an interest in urologic microsurgery and reproductive medicine and soon after pursued fellowship training in microsurgery and male reproductive medicine under the guidance of Dr. Larry Lipshultz at Baylor College of Medicine in Houston, Texas. After completing his fellowship, he was recruited to the faculty of the University of California San Francisco (UCSF).

== Medical background ==
Turek is a board-certified urologist and microsurgeon, specializing in male fertility. He has performed and published research in men's reproductive health issues including genetic infertility, ejaculatory duct obstruction, immunologic infertility, quality of life issues with infertility, testis cancer and stem cell science, and has developed several techniques for evaluating and treating male infertility. While at UCSF, he was Director of the Male Reproductive Clinical Laboratory, Program Leader of PROGENI (The Program in the Genetics of Infertility), Director of the UCSF Men's Reproductive Health Clinic and Research Program, and the director of a National Institutes of Health grant to train new faculty in men's reproductive health. He has authored more than 175 publications on clinical and scientific issues in reproductive health. Through his published work, he is a proponent of the theory that male infertility is an early marker for other diseases that occur later in life. He became a full professor, with an endowed chair in teaching funded by the Academy at UCSF, a chair he later abandoned in favor of starting his own private clinic.

He is now Director of The Turek Clinics, medical centers in California that specialize exclusively in men's reproductive health care. He was President in 2011 of the American Society of Andrology and the Society of Male Reproduction and Urology in 2013.

== Research and inventions ==
Turek has designed and led in numerous key research programs, as well as inventing several procedures, that have had significant impact on the science of men's reproductive health. Turek is an advocate for men's general health, and speaks about on the topic on television and at companies such as Google. He is on the medical advisory board for Fertile Hope, a LIVESTRONG Foundation initiative.

=== FNA Mapping ===
Turek is the inventor of Fine Needle Aspiration (FNA) Mapping, also known less formally as sperm mapping, testicular cartography, or "GPS for the testis." FNA Mapping is a non-invasive office procedure that can be performed in a standardized, template fashion to identify men who qualify for, and assist in the planning of, sperm retrieval for IVF-ICSI. This technique has been important because it has improved identification of men who are likely to have a successful sperm retrieval while at the same time avoiding costly and unnecessary assisted reproductive techniques. FNA Mapping has become a fundamental procedure in the profession and has been adopted at most reproductive centers around the world.

The success of assisted reproductive techniques such as intracytoplasmic sperm injection (ICSI) encouraged reproductive clinicians to look beyond the ejaculate and into the male reproductive tract to find sperm. In men with no sperm count (azoospermia), it soon became clear that sperm could be found in the testes and used with ICSI, but sperm production was characteristically "patchy" or "focal" in azoospermic testes. FNA Mapping was designed to diagnose the degree of "patchiness" of sperm production in azoospermic men and determine, among other things, whether a sperm retrieval would succeed in a specific patient. Prior to FNA Mapping, testis biopsy was the major procedure for determining the quality of sperm presence. Testis biopsy is a more invasive procedure than FNA Mapping, and studies have shown that FNA Mapping provides better and more complete information about sperm presence.

In addition, FNA Mapping has been used to determine the effectiveness of mapping in patients after sterilizing chemotherapy, the ability to find and diagnose small testis tumors, and the ability of mapping to precisely define subsets of infertile men for more accurate phenotyping for molecular biology and genetic studies.,

=== Ejaculatory duct obstruction and ejaculatory duct mamometry ===
In a series of papers, Turek and his team made a significant advancement in the diagnosis of ejaculatory duct obstruction (EDO) as a cause of male infertility by studying and investigating the approach and limitations of current treatments for this condition., This led to a prospective, comparative study of currently used techniques to diagnosis EDO followed by the invention and publication of a dynamic, physiologically relevant test, termed ejaculatory duct manometry, to definitively diagnose this surgical condition.

=== Evolving the hypoosmotic swelling test ===
The Hypoosmotic Swelling Test is a laboratory test to measure the functional integrity of the human sperm membrane. In this test, the sperm is exposed to a hypososmotic solution consisting of a 50:50 mixture of 150 mosmol fructose and 150 mosmol sodium citrate. The tails of normal sperm will swell when exposed to this solution, whereas damaged sperm with low motility will not swell measurably.

Although a moving or motile sperm was traditionally required for use with this technique, some infertile men have genetically immotile sperm and are unable to take advantage of this technology to become fathers. In early research in this area, Turek tried to understand more about how sperm "viability" relates to "motility." Subsequently, his team evolved the Hypoosmotic Swelling Test into a therapeutic tool that harmlessly and physiologically "pokes" a non-moving sperm to determine whether it is alive and therefore able to be used for ICSI. This technique was subsequently applied to men with genetically immotile sperm with success and this technique is now used routinely in many reproductive centers worldwide.

=== New approach to genetic testing for male infertility ===
Concerned about the risk of transmitting genetic male infertility or other genetic issues to offspring with the use of modern assisted reproductive techniques such as ICSI, Turek founded a unique, trademarked program called PROGENI (Program in the Genetics of Infertility) at the University of California San Francisco. PROGENI's methodology is based on the classic genetic counseling philosophy that advocates non-prescriptive testing for genetic disease (an approach which is based on informing the patient of risks and then letting the patient decide whether he will undergo testing to delineate risk). Turek has published over a dozen papers on improved patient outcomes and decision making from over 800 patients that have entered the program since inception.,

=== Using testis stem cells to create embryonic stem cells ===
The debate about the use of embryonic stem cells for research has been loud, acrimonious, and highly politicized with the result that embryonic stem cells were effectively banned for research uses in the United States. To solve the problem of limited embryonic stem cell availability, Turek and his colleagues invented a process by which the early germline stem cells from the normal adult testis, called spermatogonia, can be coaxed into becoming true, embryonic-like stem cells when placed in an appropriate culture environment. This finding has been independently confirmed by other research groups in the world and opens up the possibility of making embryonic stem cells for regenerative, cell-based therapy for men in the future without the need for embryos and all of the political and ethical issues that the use of human embryos engender.

=== Identifying lifestyle issues which affect male infertility ===
Throughout his career, Turek has been interested in defining common exposures that may lead to male infertility. He has published studies on the effects of hot baths and anabolic steroids on male infertility and opined about the boxer-brief controversy and the ability of the standard male infertility evaluation to detect toxic insults. He has examined the toxic effect of medications such as the antioxidant selenium and the anti-inflammatory drug class called biological response modifiers on male fertility. He has also tried to better delineate the reproductive and general health risks posed by a common birth defect in boys, the undescended testicle.,

== Academic honors and awards ==
Turek has receive numerous honors throughout his career, including the Henry Weyrauch Award from the Western Urologic Forum and James L Goebel Grand Prize from the American Urological Association. Other organizations that have recognized his work include the Philadedelphia Urological Society, the American College of Surgeons, the American Society for Reproductive Medicine, and the Academy of Medical Educators.
