= Bikar Atoll =

Atoll in the Marshall Islands

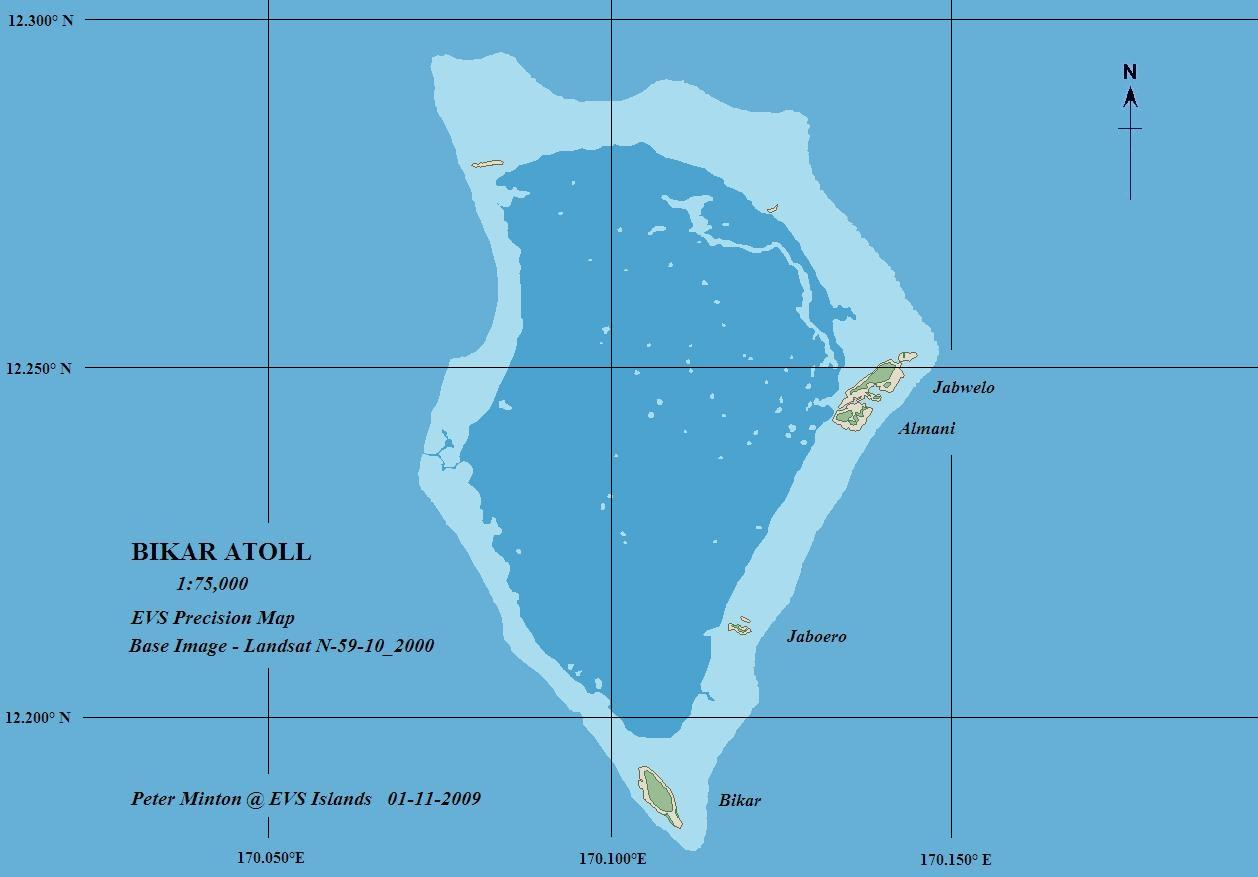
- Map of Bikar Atoll

- Location within Marshall Islands

Geography
- Location: North Pacific
- Coordinates: 12°14′N 170°08′E
- Archipelago: Marshall Islands
- Total islands: 6
- Major islands: 5
- Area: 0.5 km^{2} (0.19 sq mi)
- Highest elevation: 6 m (20 ft)

Administration
- Marshall Islands

Demographics
- Population: 0

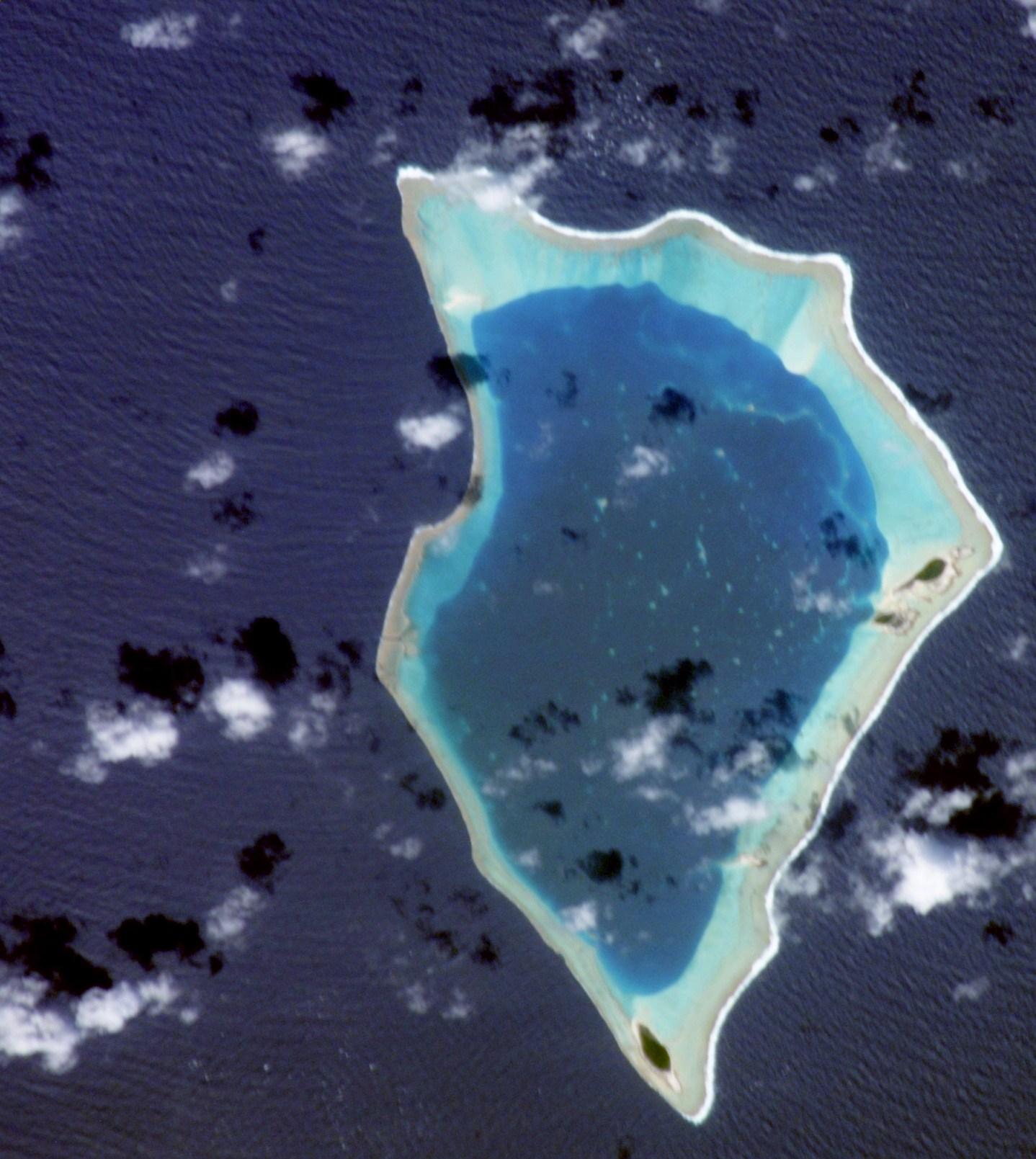
Bikar Atoll - ISS Image, 2002

Bikar Atoll (Marshallese: Pikaar, [pʲiɡɑːrˠ]) is an uninhabited atoll in the Ratak Chain of the Marshall Islands. It is one of the smallest atolls in the Marshalls. Due to its relative isolation from the main islands in the group, Bikar's flora and fauna has been able to exist in a relatively pristine condition.

== Geography ==
It is located 579 kilometers (360 mi) north of Majuro Atoll, the capital of the Marshall Islands, 320 kilometers (200 mi) South-southeast of Bokak, and 115 kilometers (71 mi) north of Utirik, the nearest inhabited atoll. The land area is 0.5 square kilometers (0.19 sq mi), surrounding a 37.4-square-kilometer (14.4 sq mi) lagoon. It consists of 6 islets.

== Physical features ==
The approximately diamond-shaped atoll measures up to 13 km north to south and up to 8 km across. Its six islets have a combined land area of less than 0.5 square kilometers (0.19 sq mi) and enclose a shallow lagoon of 37 square kilometers (14 sq mi). The surrounding reef is continuous except for one narrow pass located on the western side. The major islets are Bikar, Jabwelo, Almani and Jaboero. Bikar, the largest, reaches a height of 6 meters above sea level.

Based on the results of drilling operations on Enewetak (Eniwetok) Atoll, in the nearby Ralik Chain of the Marshall Islands, Bikar may include as much as 4600 feet of reef material atop a basalt rock base. As most local coral growth stops at about 150 feet below the ocean surface, such a massive stony coral base suggests a gradual isostatic subsidence of the underlying extinct volcano, which itself rises 10,000 feet from the surrounding ocean floor. Shallow water fossils taken from just above Enewetak's basalt base are dated to about 55 mya.

Low rainfall and high temperatures lead to arid conditions in which a freshwater Ghyben-Herzberg lens cannot form. The water at Bikar island is not as brackish as similarly arid Taongi Atoll, allowing coconuts planted by visiting islanders from Utirik Atoll to survive.

Like Taongi Atoll, the combination of an almost completely enclosed lagoon and waves driven over the reef by the prevailing northeastern trade winds results in the water level being perched some 0.5 m above the mean tide level.

== Climate ==
Bikar is one of the driest of the Marshall Islands atolls, having a semi-arid character. Mean annual temperature is approximately 82 °F (28 °C). Mean annual rainfall is less than 45 inches (1,143 mm), and falls primarily during the July through October rainy season. Prevailing winds are north to north-easterlies.

== Vegetation ==
Plant species of atoll forest include Pandanus tectorius, Lepturus repens, Cocos nucifera, Boerhavia repens, Pisonia grandis, Portulaca lutea, Triumfetta procumbens, Tournefortia argentea and Scaevola sericea, as well as areas of atoll scrub and vines. Much of the Pisonia forest noted in earlier surveys was devastated by a cyclone, perhaps Typhoon Mary in 1977. This is likely a naturally recurring event. A small number of coconut palms planted by visiting islanders survive. A 1952 survey found that they produced small nuts containing bitter milk.

== Fauna ==
Bikar's status as a major seabird nesting site was affected by a cyclone and the introduction of more aggressive rat species.

Twenty-three species of birds were found in a 1969 survey, of which 19 were observed during a follow-up count in 1988. Species breeding in larger numbers that year included the great frigatebird and red-footed booby. Their numbers appear reduced due to the destruction of the Pisonia forests. Other breeding species include the red-tailed tropicbird, white-tailed tropicbird, the masked booby, brown booby, white tern, brown noddy, and sooty tern.

Migrant birds include small numbers of the ruddy turnstone, wandering tattler, bristle-thighed curlew, lesser golden plover, and Pacific reef heron.

Bikar is also a major nesting site for the endangered green turtle, over 250 nesting sites having been observed in 1988.

The Polynesian rat was historically common on Bikar and Jabwelo. By 1993, a "population explosion" of non-Polynesian rats had been noted on the atoll, most likely introduced by Asian fishing trawlers operating illegally in the vicinity of Bikar. This raised concerns for the important sea turtle and bird nesting sites. In 2025, rats were successfully eradicated from the atoll, with positive impacts on birdlife and reforestation noted shortly after.

The coral fauna lacks diversity and shows signs of frequent storm damage. The corals include several genera not seen at Taongi Atoll, and the diversity of fish is much greater, including the two-spot red snapper, humpback red snapper, leopard grouper, and humphead parrot fish.

Shellfish include the black-lipped pearl oyster, bear paw clam, maxima clam, and the Trochus sea snail. No marine mammals have been seen in the lagoon.

== History ==
=== Prehistory ===
Although humans migrated to the Marshall Islands about 2000 years ago, and Bikar was occasionally visited by the Marshallese, there is no evidence that there has ever been a resident human population. The lack of water and the susceptibility of the atoll to cyclone and storm disturbance precluded traditional Micronesian stables, and indicate that it will probably remain uninhabited. The atoll has traditionally been used for hunting and gathering, particularly seabirds and turtles, by inhabitants of other atolls in the northern Ratak chain. Along with the other uninhabited northern Ratak atolls of Bokak (Taongi) and Toke, Bikar was traditionally the hereditary property of the Ratak atoll chain Iroji Lablab. The exploitation of abundant sea turtles, birds, and eggs was regulated by custom, and overseen by the Iroji.

=== 19th century ===
The Russian brig Rurik, with Captain Otto von Kotzebue, visited in summer 1817 during a search for a north passage between western Russia and its North American territories.

The French corvette Danaide, Capt J. de Rosamel, visited the atoll in August 1840 during a hydrographical survey of islands in the Pacific.

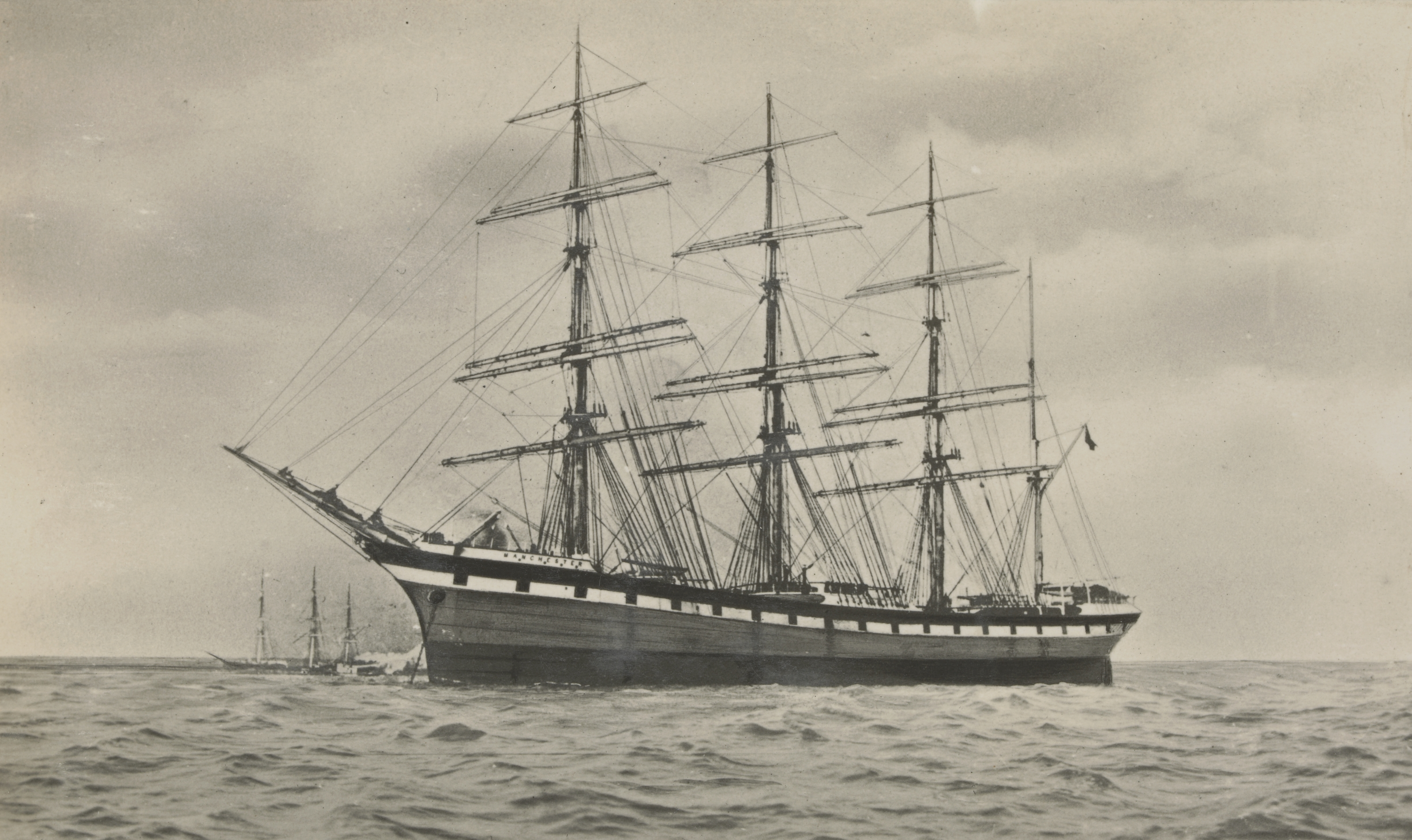
The Manchester

During the late 1800s, Bikar was the subject of a number of commercial transactions related to the increasing German presence in the Marshall Islands. On January 12, 1880, Bikar was sold by Iroojs Jurtaka and Takular of Maloelap, and on June 19, sold by Irooj Lajikit and Tannara of Utirik to Adolph Capelle & Co. On December 18, 1883, the Atoll was sold to Deutsche Handels und Plantagengesellschaft. The German Empire annexed Bikar and the rest of the Marshall Islands in 1885, and in December 1887 property rights were transferred to the Jaluit Gesellschaft.

In 1900, the Manchester, a four-masted steel-hulled cargo ship of 2851 tons with a load of kerosene, went missing at sea between New York City and Yokohama. Wreckage and signs of habitation were discovered on Bikar in 1901, suggesting that the ship had come to grief there and that the survivors had pushed off in lifeboats shortly before the discovery. No sign of the crew or passengers has since been found.

=== 20th century to present ===
In 1914, the Empire of Japan occupied the Marshall Islands, and transferred German government properties to their own, including Bikar. Like the Germans before them, the Japanese colonial administration (the South Seas Mandate) did not attempt to exploit the atoll, and the Northern Radak Marshallese continued to hunt and fish unmolested. Following the end of World War II, the island came under the control of the United States as part of the Trust Territory of the Pacific Islands. In 1951, the U.S. Geological Survey and the Army Corps of Engineers sponsored an expedition to Bikar and Taongi Atolls, to characterize their primeval environment.

While en route from the US to Asia in April 1953, LST 1138, later commissioned as USS Steuben County, dropped anchor at Bikar to search for rumored Japanese stragglers. The landing party found no signs of any current occupants.

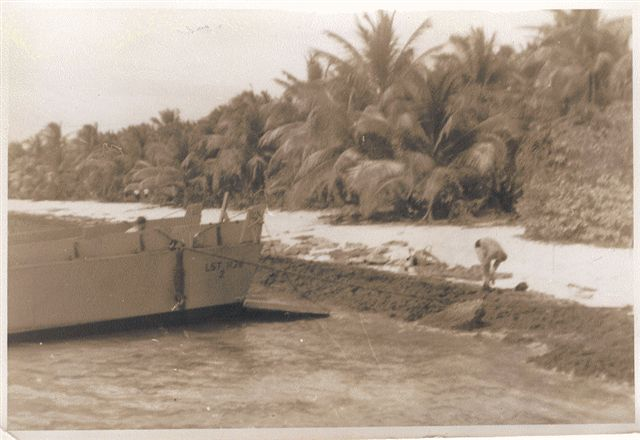
US Navy landing party on Bikar Island, 1953.

In 1954, the fallout plume from the Castle Bravo nuclear test passed over Bikar about 20 hours after the shot. Based on ash from plant samples taken on March 9, the atoll was contaminated by about 1,400,000 d/m/gm of radioactive material, compared with 35,000,000 d/m/gm from the most contaminated soil samples at Rongelap Atoll, and 950 d/m/gm at Majuro Atoll, several hundred miles south of the fallout pattern. This experience led to a pre-planned aerial survey of atolls adjacent to the subsequent March 27 Castle Romeo test, timed at one and four hours after the shot. The aircraft were equipped with gamma radiation detectors designed to measure ground contamination from altitudes of 200 to 500 feet. An overflight of Bikar Island measured 0.1 mrem/hr (1 μGy) an hour after the shot, rising to 15 mrem/hr (150 μGy) three hours later.

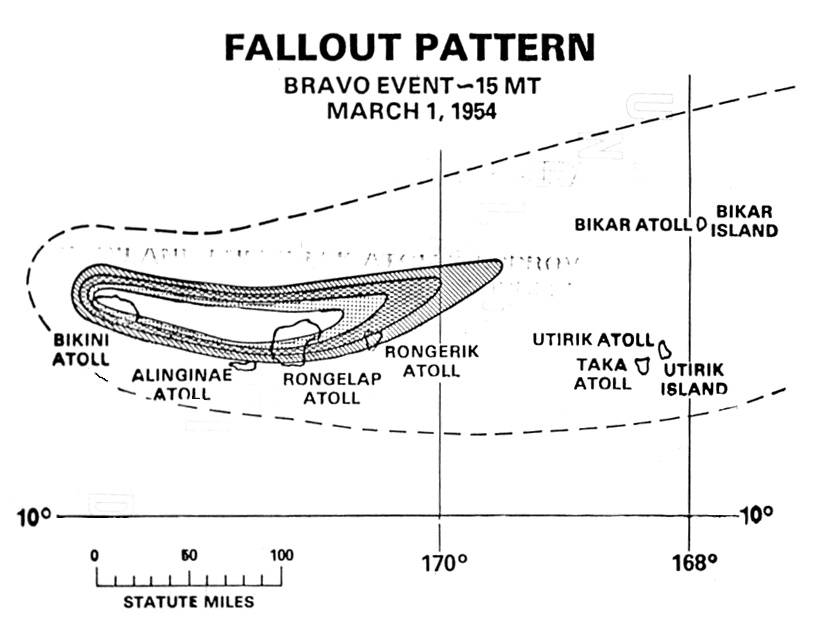
The Castle Bravo fallout pattern.

In 1962, 19 Japanese fishermen from the fishing boat Daitei Maru No. 15 were marooned on Bikar Atoll for several days before being rescued by the U.S. Coast Guard.

A 1981 study of fish and invertebrates within the lagoon found that the level of radio-nucleotides in muscle tissue was within the range found in fish products imported to the US and Japanese markets. The worldwide source of seafood-borne radio-nucleotides is a result of atmospheric nuclear testing since 1945, and therefore any residual activity from the 1950s Castle series of tests contributes only a small fraction of the contamination within the lagoon's sea life.

Currently, no archaeological remains of Polynesian habitation have been identified. The almost completed corroded wreck of a Japanese fishing boat lies in the north fork of the reef passage.

In 2025, the atoll was included in the Marshall Islands' first designated marine sanctuary,, concurrent with the eradication of introduced rats.

== See also ==
- Desert island
- List of islands
