= Prognosis =

Medical term for the likely development of a disease

Prognosis (Ancient Greek: πρόγνωσις 'fore-knowing, foreseeing'; pl.: prognoses) is a medical term for predicting the likelihood or expected development of a disease, including whether the signs and symptoms will improve or worsen (and how quickly) or remain stable over time; expectations of quality of life, such as the ability to carry out daily activities; the potential for complications and associated health issues; and the likelihood of survival (including life expectancy). A prognosis is made on the basis of the normal course of the diagnosed disease, the individual's physical and mental condition, the available treatments, and additional factors. A complete prognosis includes the expected duration, function, and description of the course of the disease, such as progressive decline, intermittent crisis, or sudden, unpredictable crisis.

When applied to large statistical populations, prognostic estimates can be very accurate: for example the statement "45% of patients with severe septic shock will die within 28 days" can be made with some confidence, because previous research found that this proportion of patients died. This statistical information does not apply to the prognosis for each individual patient, because patient-specific factors can substantially change the expected course of the disease: additional information is needed to determine whether a patient belongs to the 45% who will die, or to the 55% who survive.

== Methodology ==
=== Disease and prognostic indicators ===
Prognostic scoring is also used for cancer outcome predictions. A Manchester score is an indicator of prognosis for small-cell lung cancer. For non-Hodgkin lymphoma, physicians have developed the International Prognostic Index to predict patient outcome. Other medical areas where prognostic indicators are used include drug-induced liver injury (DILI) (Hy's law), the use of an exercise stress test after myocardial infarction, and to predict survival in people with multiple myeloma.

=== End of life ===
Studies have found that most doctors are overly optimistic when making a prognosis; they tend to overstate how long a patient might live. For patients who are critically ill, particularly those in an intensive care unit, there are numerical prognostic scoring systems that are more accurate. The most famous of these is the APACHE II scale, which is most accurate when applied in the seven days prior to a patient's predicted death.

Knowing the prognosis helps determine whether it makes more sense to attempt or withhold certain treatments, and thus plays an important role in end-of-life decisions and advance care planning.

== Estimator ==
Estimators that are commonly used to describe prognoses include:

- Progression-free survival – the length of time during and after medication or treatment during which the disease being treated (usually cancer) does not get worse.
- Survival rate – indicating the percentage of people in a study or treatment group who are alive for a given period of time after diagnosis.
- Survival time – the remaining duration of life. If not otherwise specified, it generally starts from the time of diagnosis.

== History ==
One of the earliest written works of medicine is the Book of Prognostics of Hippocrates, written around 400 BC. This work opens with the following statement: "It appears to me a most excellent thing for the physician to cultivate Prognosis; for by foreseeing and foretelling, in the presence of the sick, the present, the past, and the future, and explaining the omissions which patients have been guilty of, he will be the more readily believed to be acquainted with the circumstances of the sick; so that men will have confidence to intrust themselves to such a physician."

For 19th-century physicians, particularly those following the French school of medicine, the main aim of medicine was not to cure disease, but rather to give a medical diagnosis and achieve a satisfying prognosis of the patient's chances. Only several decades later did the focus of efforts in Western medicine shift to curing disease.

== See also ==
- Cure – Substance or procedure that ends a medical condition
- Medical diagnosis – Process to identify a disease or disorder
- Nocebo – Harmful effect from negative belief
- Optimism bias – Type of cognitive bias
- Placebo (origins of technical term) – Substance or treatment of no therapeutic value
- Prediction – Statement about a future event
- Reference class forecasting – Method of predicting the future
- Relative survival – Calculation in epidemiology
- Sign (medicine) – Indications of a specific illness, including psychiatric
- Signs and symptoms – Indications of a specific illness, including psychiatric
- Survival analysis – Branch of statistics
- Survival rate – Medical analysis of disease
- Symptom – Indications of a specific illness, including psychiatric
