= Manchester (surname) =

Manchester is a surname. Notable people with the surname include:

- Catherine Manchester (born 1957), New Zealand painter
- Devon Manchester (born 1989), New Zealand field hockey player
- Doug Manchester (born 1942), American real estate developer and newspaper owner
- Glen Manchester (born 1965), English innovator and entrepreneur
- Jeffrey Manchester (born 1971), American convicted spree-robber
- Melissa Manchester (born 1951), American singer-songwriter
- Roy C. Manchester (1887–1975), American Boy Scout executive
- Susan Manchester (born 1987), American politician in Ohio
- Tre Manchester (born 1992), American writer, director, and producer
- William Manchester (1922–2004), American historian and biographer
- Eric Manchester (1964–2023), American actor and model
