= Manchester High School =

Manchester High School may mean any of the following educational institutions:

== United States ==
- Manchester High School (Connecticut), Manchester, Connecticut
- Manchester High School (Georgia), Manchester, Georgia
- Manchester High School (North Manchester, Indiana)
- Manchester High School, Manchester, Michigan
- Manchester High School Central, Manchester, New Hampshire
- Manchester High School West, Manchester, New Hampshire
- Manchester Memorial High School, Manchester, New Hampshire
- Manchester School of Technology, a high school in Manchester, New Hampshire
- Manchester Township High School, Manchester Township, New Jersey
- Manchester High School (New Franklin, Ohio)
- Manchester High School (Manchester, Ohio)
- Manchester High School (Virginia), Midlothian, Virginia

== Elsewhere ==
- Manchester High School, Jamaica, Mandeville, Jamaica
- Manchester High School for Girls, Manchester, England

== See also ==
- Manchester Essex Regional Middle/High School, Manchester-by-the-Sea, Massachusetts
