= Bokak Atoll =

Atoll in the Marshall Islands

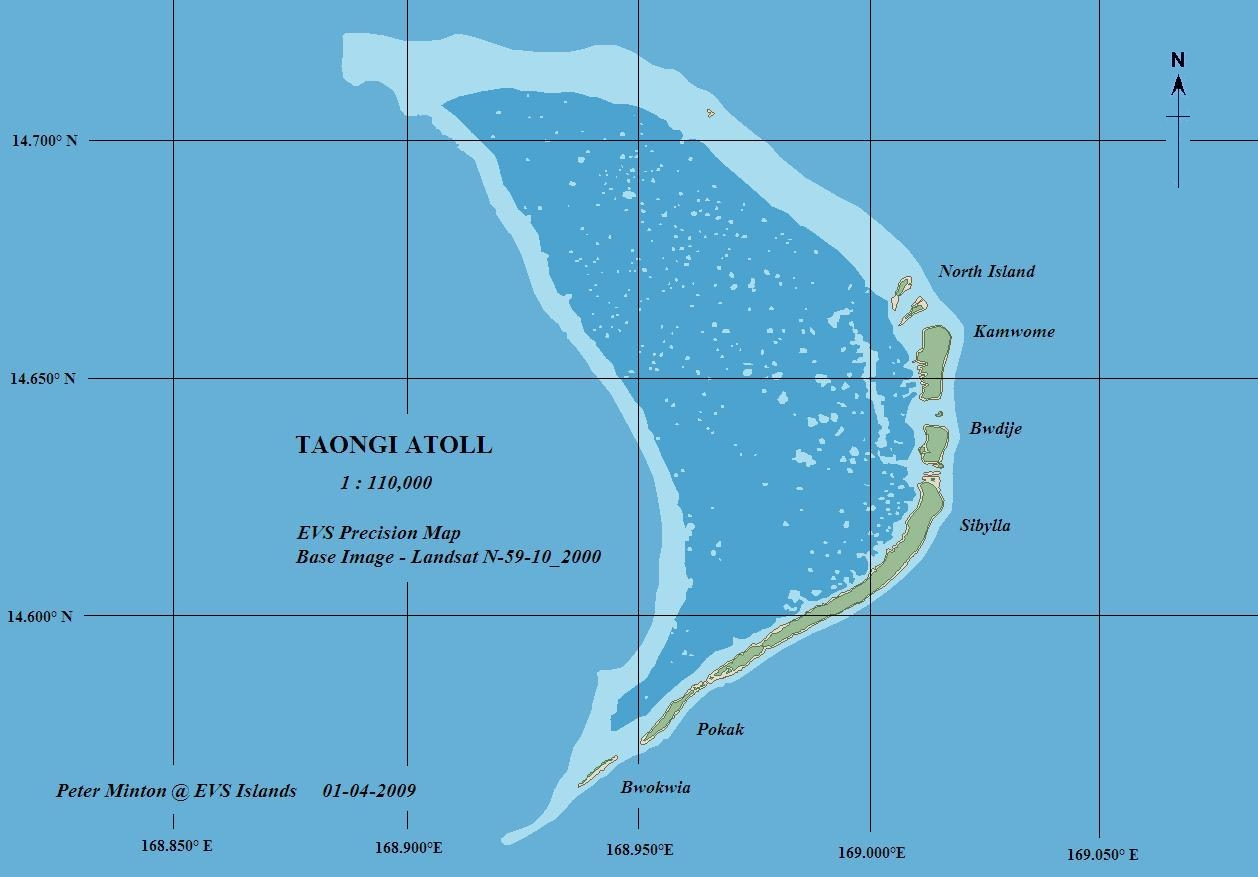
- Map of Bokak

- Bokak Atoll (Marshall islands)

Geography
- Location: North Pacific
- Coordinates: 14°32′N 169°00′E
- Archipelago: Ratak
- Total islands: 10
- Major islands: 6
- Area: 129 km^{2} (50 sq mi)
- Highest elevation: 3 m (10 ft)

Administration
- Marshall Islands

Bokak Atoll (Marshallese: Bokaak or Bok-ak, [pˠɔɡwɑːk]) or Taongi Atoll is an uninhabited coral atoll in the Ratak Chain of the Marshall Islands, in the North Pacific Ocean. Due to its relative isolation from the main islands in the group, Bokak's flora and fauna has been able to exist in a pristine condition.

== Geography ==
It is located 685 km (426 mi) north of Majuro Atoll, the capital of the Marshall Islands, and 280 km (170 mi) north-northwest of Bikar Atoll, the closest atoll, making it the most northerly and most isolated atoll of the country. Wake Island is 348 mi (560 km) north-northwest. The land area is 3.2 km^{2} (1.2 sq mi), and the lagoon measures 78 km^{2} (30 sq mi). It consists of 36 islets. The total area is 129 km^{2} (50 sq mi) (including reef flat).

== Physical features ==
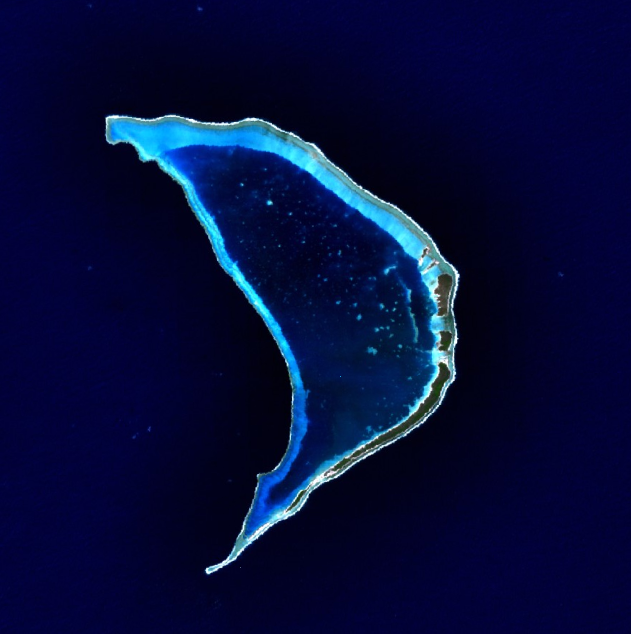
Bokak Atoll - NASA NLT Landsat 7 (Visible Color) Satellite Image

The atoll is roughly crescent-shaped, measuring about 18 km (11 mi) by 9 km (5.6 mi), and oriented in a north–south direction. The atoll reef is unbroken except for a 20 m (66 ft) wide channel in the west. Ten islets lie on the eastern and southeastern reef. The more important named islets, from north to south, are North Island, Kamwome, Bwdije, Sibylla, Bokak, and Bwokwla. Sibylla is the largest, measuring approximately 7.2 km (4.5 mi) in length and up to 305 m (334 yd) in width. Kamwome Islet to the north-east of Sibylla is the second largest, while Bokak (Taongi), after which the atoll is named, lies to the south of Sibylla.

Based on the results of drilling operations on Enewetak (Eniwetok) Atoll, in the nearby Ralik Chain of the Marshall Islands, Bokak may include as much as 1,400 m (4,600 ft) of reef material atop a basalt rock base. As most local coral growth stops at about 45 m (148 ft) below the ocean surface, such a massive stony coral base suggests a gradual isostatic subsidence of the underlying extinct volcano, which itself rises 3,000 m (9,800 ft) from the surrounding ocean floor. Shallow water fossils taken from just above Enewetak's basalt base are dated to about 55mya.

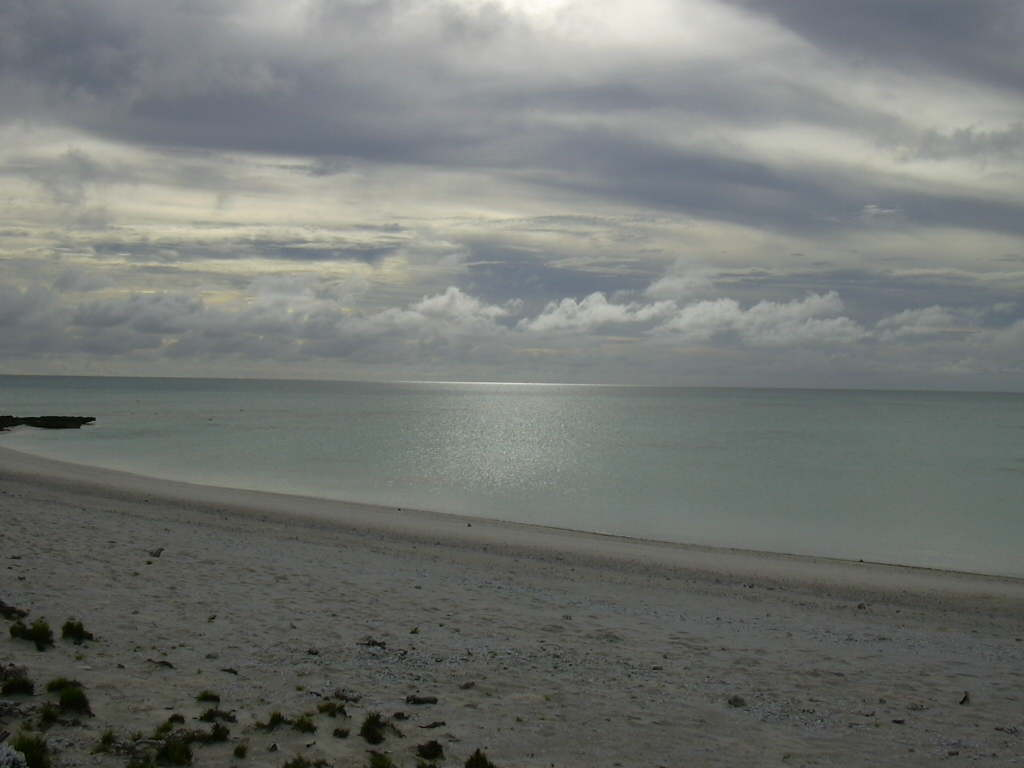
Bokak's perched lagoon sits 3 feet (0.91 m) above the mean tide level, resulting in an unusually calm surface.

High boulder and sand ridges indicate a history of severe storms and are a feature of the islets. Inland on the wider islets are sand and rubble flats, while back from the lagoon sides are low sand and gravel ridges. Soils are mostly very immature, a mixture of coarser coral sand and gravel of various textures with very little humus accumulation. The lagoon is shallow, probably not exceeding 30 meters (98 ft) depth, and has many coral heads and patch reefs, some reaching the surface.

The lagoon water level is up to 1 meter (3.3 ft) higher than the surrounding ocean due to an influx of wind-driven waters over the windward ocean reef and the presence of only one narrow reef passage on the leeward side. Water cascades over the coral-covered rim and flats of the sloping leeward reef. A massive algal ridge lines the outer edge of the windward reef, while the south and west reefs are coral-covered narrow flats where landings can be made in quiet weather. A very small algal rim, 100–150 mm (4–6 in) high, on lagoon shores of the westernmost islets, on east-facing lagoon reef-fronts and on the windward edges of coral patches in the lagoon, may be a feature unique to Taongi. This rim is maintained by the constant flow of water over the reef flat.

== Climate ==
Bokak is the driest of the Marshall Islands atolls, having a semi-arid character. Mean annual temperature is approximately 28 °C (82 °F). Mean annual rainfall is less than 1,000 mm (39 in), and falls primarily during the late summer. Prevailing winds are north to north-easterlies.

== Vegetation ==
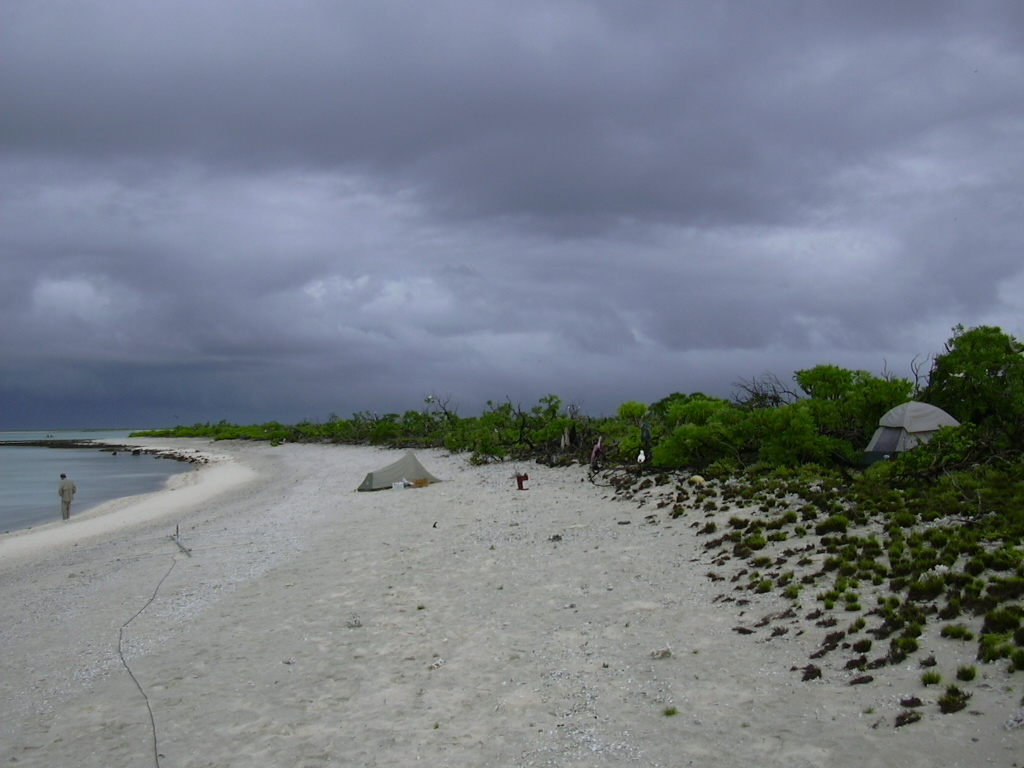
Lagoon shoreline at Sibylla Island, with coral rubble beach and edge of Naupaka shrubland.

Bokak supports just nine plant species. All are native to the Marshall Islands and entirely undisturbed by introduced species. A combination of insufficient rainfall, excellent drainage, and high temperatures lead to an arid environment in which a freshwater Ghyben-Herzberg lens cannot form, and coconut palm is unable to grow. The most common formation is a low, sparse scrub forest of tree heliotrope (Heliotropium foertherianum), 2–6 m (6 ft 7 in – 19 ft 8 in) tall, with occasional taller trees. The understory typically comprises beach maupaka (Scaevola taccada), or sparse endemic bunchgrass, ʻihi (Portulaca molokiniensis), ʻilima (Sida fallax), or alena (Boerhavia herbstii), the latter being more abundant on broken coral gravel. A small stand of Pisonia grandis is found on Kamwome Islet and in another very small stand on Sibylla.

Dense stands of beach naupaka (Scaevola taccada), often accompanied by tree heliotripe (Heliotropium foertherianum), cover 50-75% of southern Sibylla and nearly all of northeastern Sibylla. The island features shrublands dominated by Heliotropium, Scaevola, and Sida species, as well as sandy bunchgrass savanna (Lepturus spp).

The aquatic vegetation of the shallow edges of the lagoon consists of sparse coralline algae, encrusting fragments of coral and shells, and patches of green seaweed.

== Fauna ==
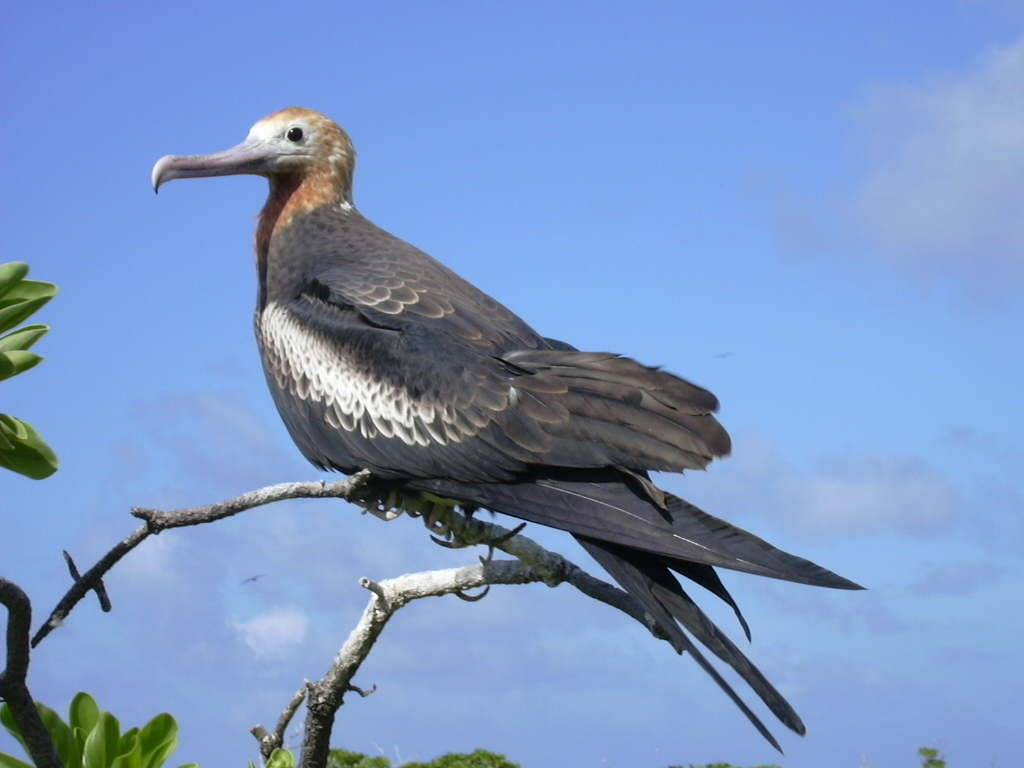
Female frigatebird on Sibylla Island.

The atoll supports a large population of sea and shorebirds, with up to 26 species present. Species breeding during 1988 included the brown booby, red-footed booby, great frigatebird, red-tailed tropicbird, sooty tern, white tern, brown noddy, and possibly the reef heron. Migratory birds present included the bristle-thighed curlew, turnstone, wandering tattler, golden plover, and the sanderling. The densest bird populations are on three islets to the north of Sibylla: North (Kita), Kamwome and an unnamed islet. Bokak is the only known breeding ground of Christmas shearwater and possibly Bulwer's petrel.

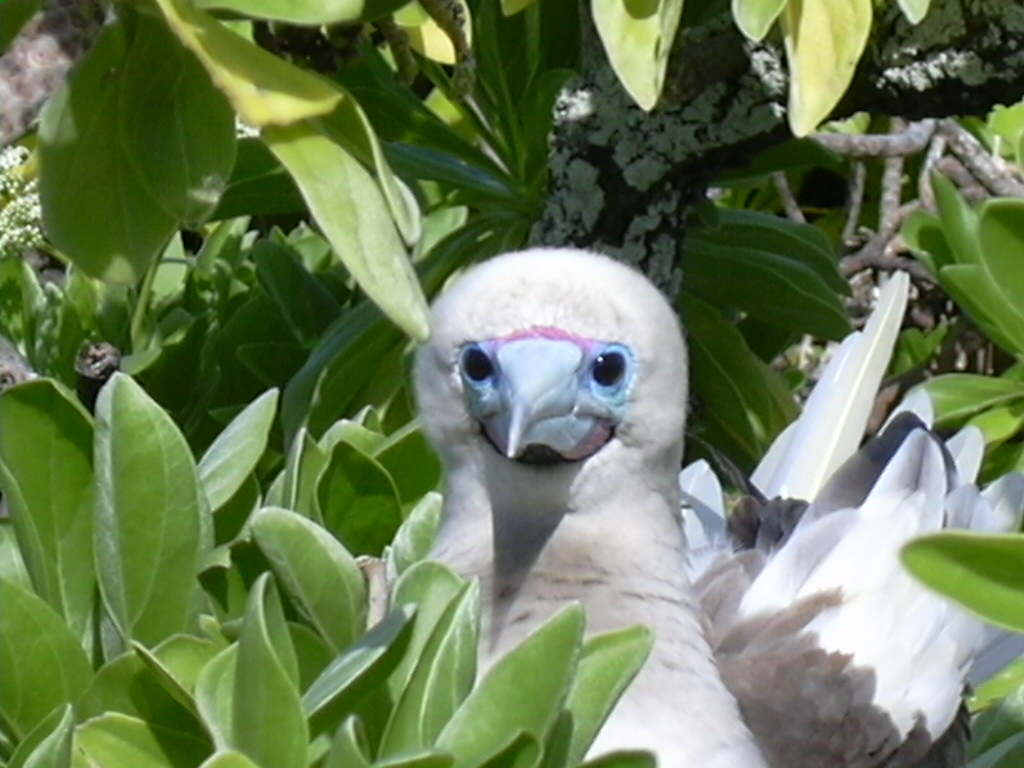
Red-footed booby on Sibylla Island

Terrestrial species includes the Polynesian rat on Sibylla. The more aggressive black rat appears to be absent, despite wrecked fishing vessels on the eastern and north eastern reefs. The snake-eyed skink and large hermit crabs are common.

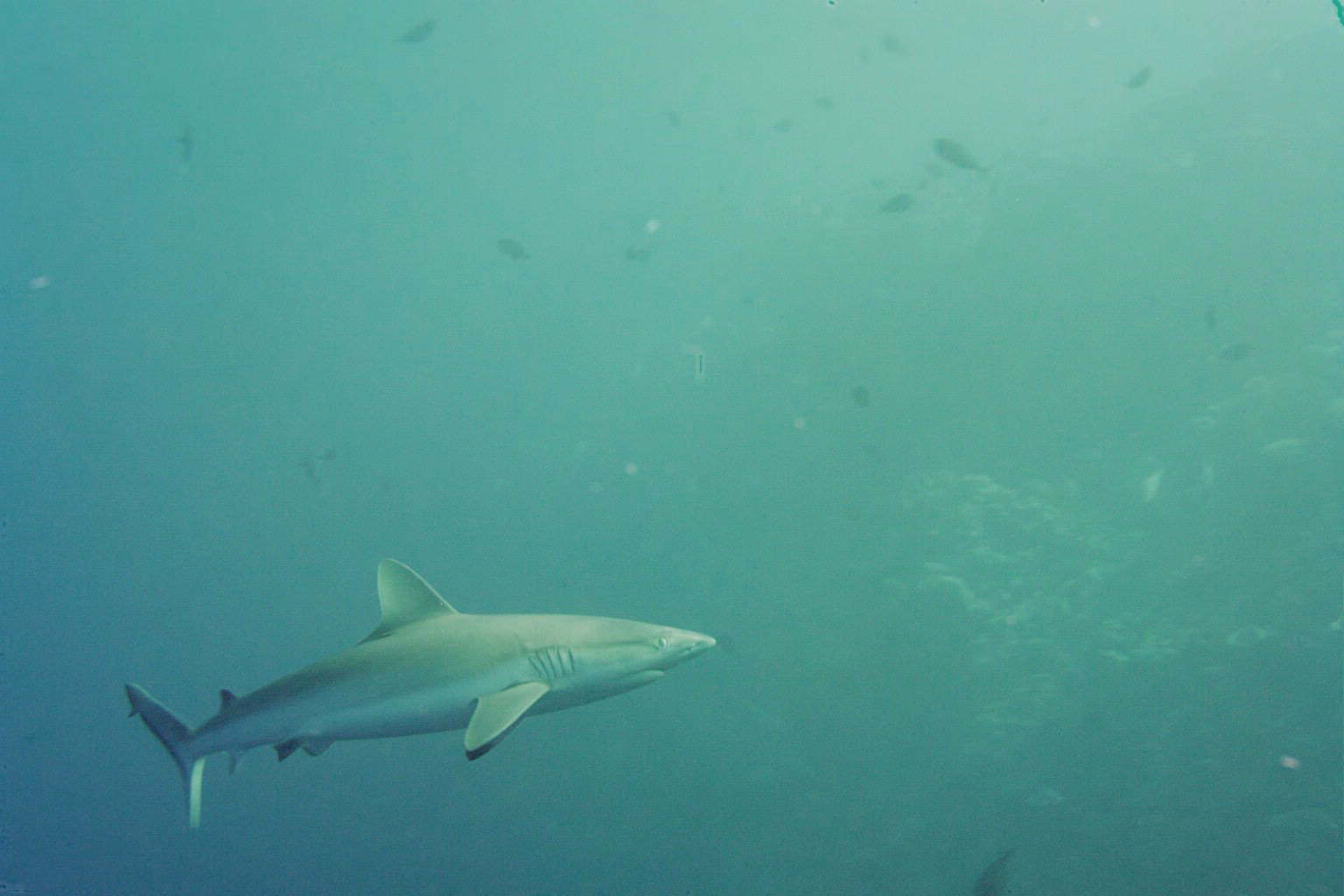
Grey reef shark near western pass

In general, the aquatic fauna population is healthy, but of low diversity, possibly due to the atoll's isolation. Researchers have not seen any marine turtles, but Polynesian custom regarding harvesting assumed their presence. Examples of the giant clam family Tridacnidae are very abundant, except for the largest giant clam T. gigas. Smaller bivalves were present, but few Mollusks. The reef fish are primarily emperor breams, parrotfish, and red snappers. Also present are moray eel and grey reef shark. Approximately 100 stony coral species and two soft coral species are present.

== History ==
=== Prehistory ===
Although humans migrated to the Marshall Islands about 2000 years ago, there appear to be no traditional Marshallese artifacts present that would indicate any long term settlement. The harsh, desiccated climate, lack of potable water, and poverty of the soils indicate that the atoll will probably remain uninhabited. The atoll has traditionally been used for hunting and gathering, particularly seabirds, by inhabitants of other atolls in the northern Ratak chain. Along with the other uninhabited northern Ratak atolls of Bikar and Toke, Bokak was traditionally the hereditary property of the Iroji Lablab (chiefs) of the Ratak atoll chain. The exploitation of abundant sea turtles, birds, and eggs was regulated by custom, and overseen by the Iroji.

=== 16th to 19th Century ===
The first European to record sighting Bokak was Toribio Alonso de Salazar, a Spanish explorer, on August 22, 1526, who commanded Loaisa expedition after the death of Loaisa and Elcano. It was charted as San Bartolome. It was explored by Spanish naval officer Fernando Quintano in 1795. A number of other Western ships recorded landfall on or passage by Bokak over the following three hundred years, but no attempt at settlement or establishment of food animals was noted, likely due to the arid conditions, and more fertile atolls nearby.

The German Empire annexed the Marshall Islands in 1885 and added to the protectorate of German New Guinea in 1906. Using the justification that uninhabited atolls were unclaimed, the Germans seized Bokak as government property, despite the protests of the local chiefs (Irojilaplap). As Japan's economic vigor expanded under the Meiji Emperor, the German administration noted Marshallese complaints of Japanese bird poaching, more from the view of protecting German sovereignty, rather than the interests of the islanders.

=== 20th century to present ===
In 1914, the Empire of Japan occupied the Marshall Islands, and transferred German government properties to their own, including Bokak. Like the Germans before them, the Japanese colonial administration did not attempt to exploit the atoll, and the Northern Ratak Marshallese continued to hunt and fish unmolested.

As a part of the 1940s Japanese militarization of the Marshall Islands, a small seaplane and communication outpost was established on Sibylla Island. During the early stages of the World War II, USN submarines operating in the area would periodically note patrols by Japanese aircraft. In March, 1943, the 20 man garrison was removed to Wake Island because of the lack of food and their general inability to sustain themselves on Bokak. Air elements of the USAAF, USN, and USMC bombed the (abandoned) facility on April 23, 1944. The base became part of the vast US Naval Base Marshall Islands.

The Marshall Islands as a whole were transferred to American administration in the wake of battles with Japanese forces in 1944. In September, 1945, as a part of the post-war repatriation of Japanese from their former Pacific possessions, a landing party was dispatched on LCI(L) 601 from Kwajalein to Bokak Atoll, and in conjunction with a PBM Mariner searched for potential survivors. Two days of search failed to turn up any survivors, human remains, or graves.

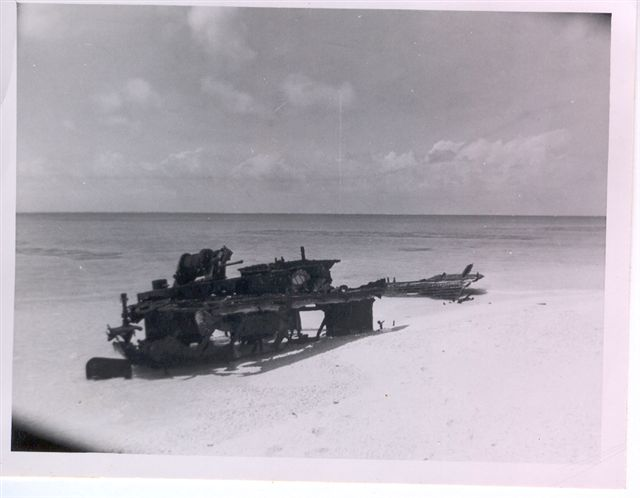
Corroded skeleton of IJN landing craft, Sibylla Island, 1953.

While en route from the US to Asia in April, 1953, LST 1138, later commissioned as USS Steuben County, dropped anchor at Bokak to search for rumored Japanese stragglers. The landing party noted the remains of the wartime outpost, but found no signs of any current occupants.

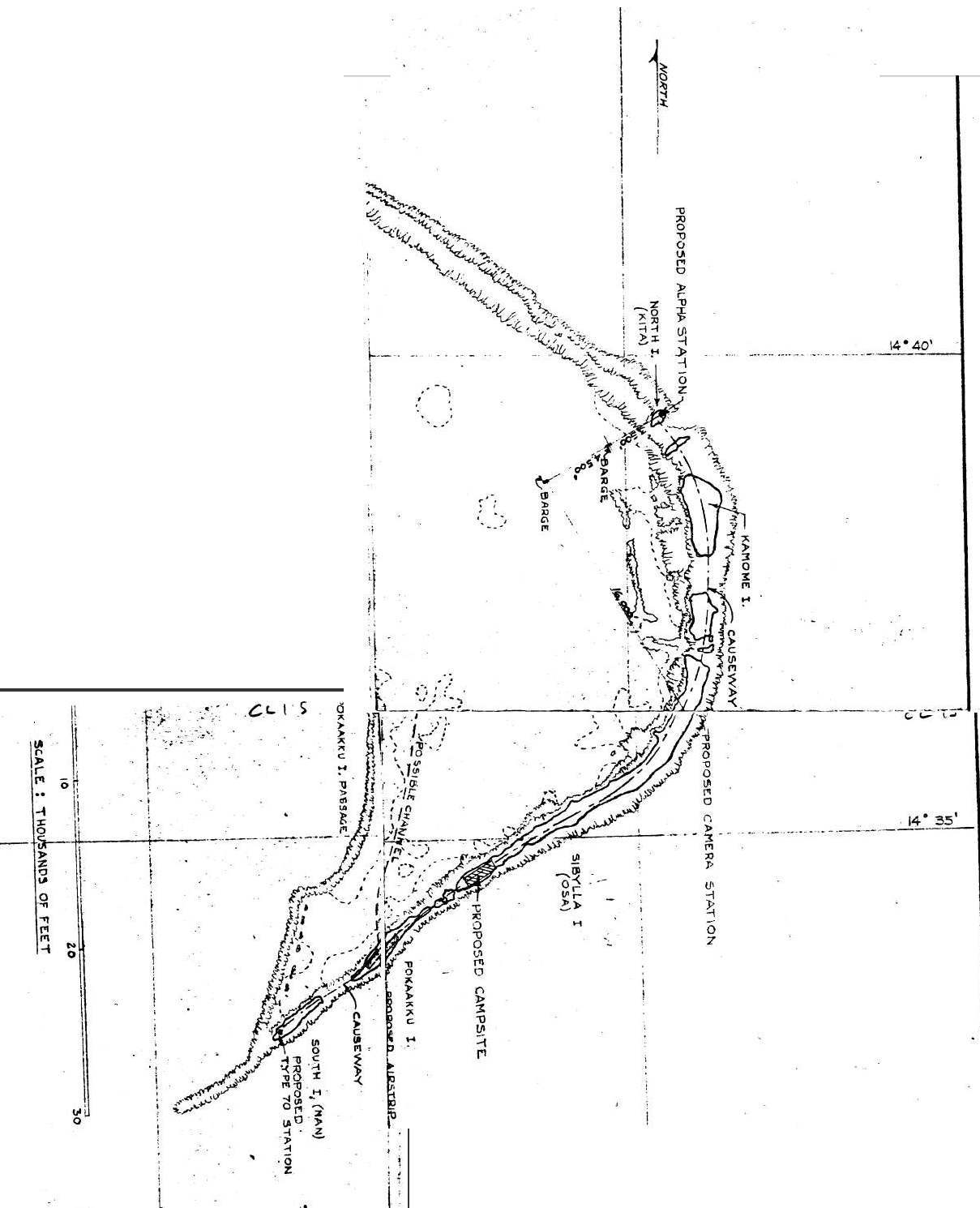
Nuclear test site master plan, from a declassified 1957 LASL document.

In 1954, the experience of large scale fallout from the Castle Bravo nuclear test on Bikini Atoll led to a pre-planned aerial survey of atolls adjacent to the subsequent Castle Romeo test, timed at one and four hours after the shot. The aircraft were equipped with gamma radiation detectors designed to measure ground contamination from altitudes of 61–152 m (200–500 ft). An overflight of Sibylla Island measured 1.0 mrem/hr (10 μGy) an hour after the shot, dropping to 0.4 mrem/hr (4 μGy) three hours later. In 1957, Bokak was surveyed as a site for nuclear weapons testing as a part of Operation Hardtack, but due to the number of improvements required to develop it, was passed over in favor of reusing the Bikini, Enewetak, and Nevada test sites. The atoll came under renewed consideration for use during Operation Dominic, but by that time the potential for political fallout from nuclear testing within a United Nations Trust Territory was deemed too great.

The atoll played a part in the disappearance of several men from Maui, Hawaii. On February 11, 1979, Scott Moorman and four companions set sail from Hana harbor in a 17-foot Boston Whaler, and went missing in subsequent high seas. The boat and buried remains of Moorman were discovered 3,760 km (2,340 mi) away on Bokak in 1988.

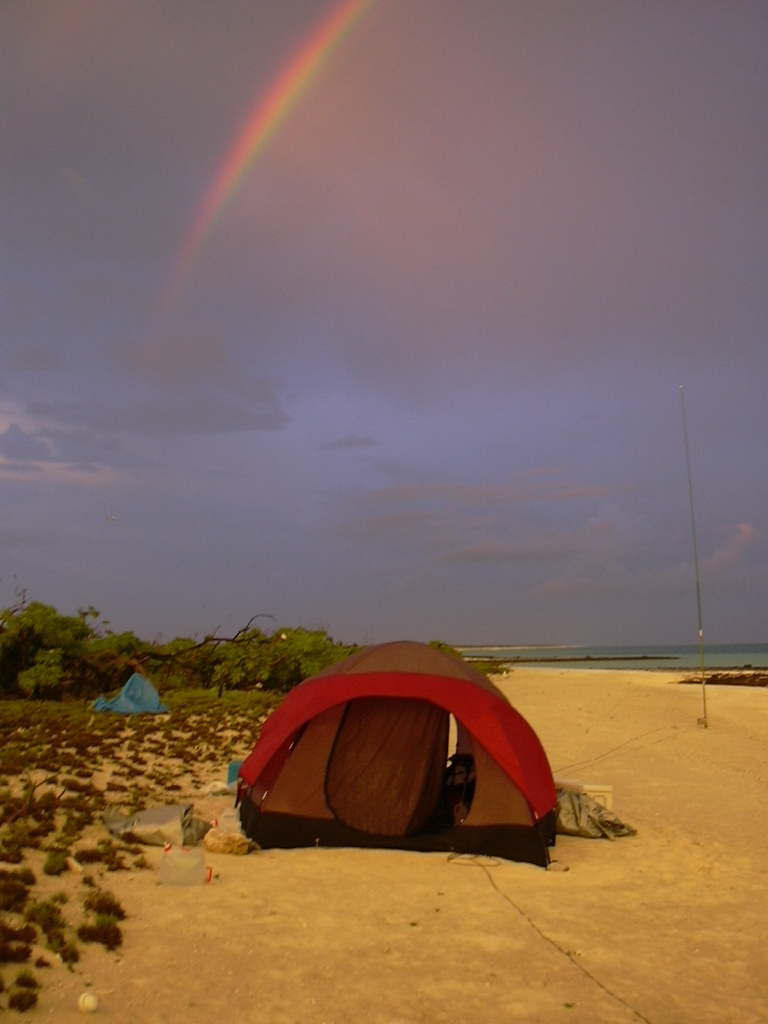
V73T on Sibylla Island.

In 1988, the US firm Admiralty Pacific proposed to use the Bokak lagoon as a dump for millions of tons of solid waste. The proposal involved shipping 3.5 million tons of waste the first year and up to 25 million tons and 30 ships after five years.

In August, 2003, two ham radio enthusiasts from Texas camped on Sibylla Island for 76 hours to inaugurate the first Taongi ham station, call sign V73T, and assigned the IOTA reference number OC-263. The station transmitted from coordinates 14°36.574′N 168°59.977′E.

The Dominion of Melchizedek, an unrecognized micronation, claims sovereignty over Bokak, based on a 45-year lease allegedly granted by the Irojilaplap. The rights conveyed to DOM cannot be greater than the traditional leader possessed themself. As such they are still subject to the Government of the Marshall Islands and are not independent.

Currently, historic remains include an abandoned camp/homestead, several wrecked ships and the remnant of the former World War Two Japanese communication outpost.

In 2025, the atoll was included in the Marshall Islands' first designated marine sanctuary.

== See also ==
- Desert island
- List of islands
