= Glen Manchester =

British technology pioneer, innovator and entrepreneur (born 1965)

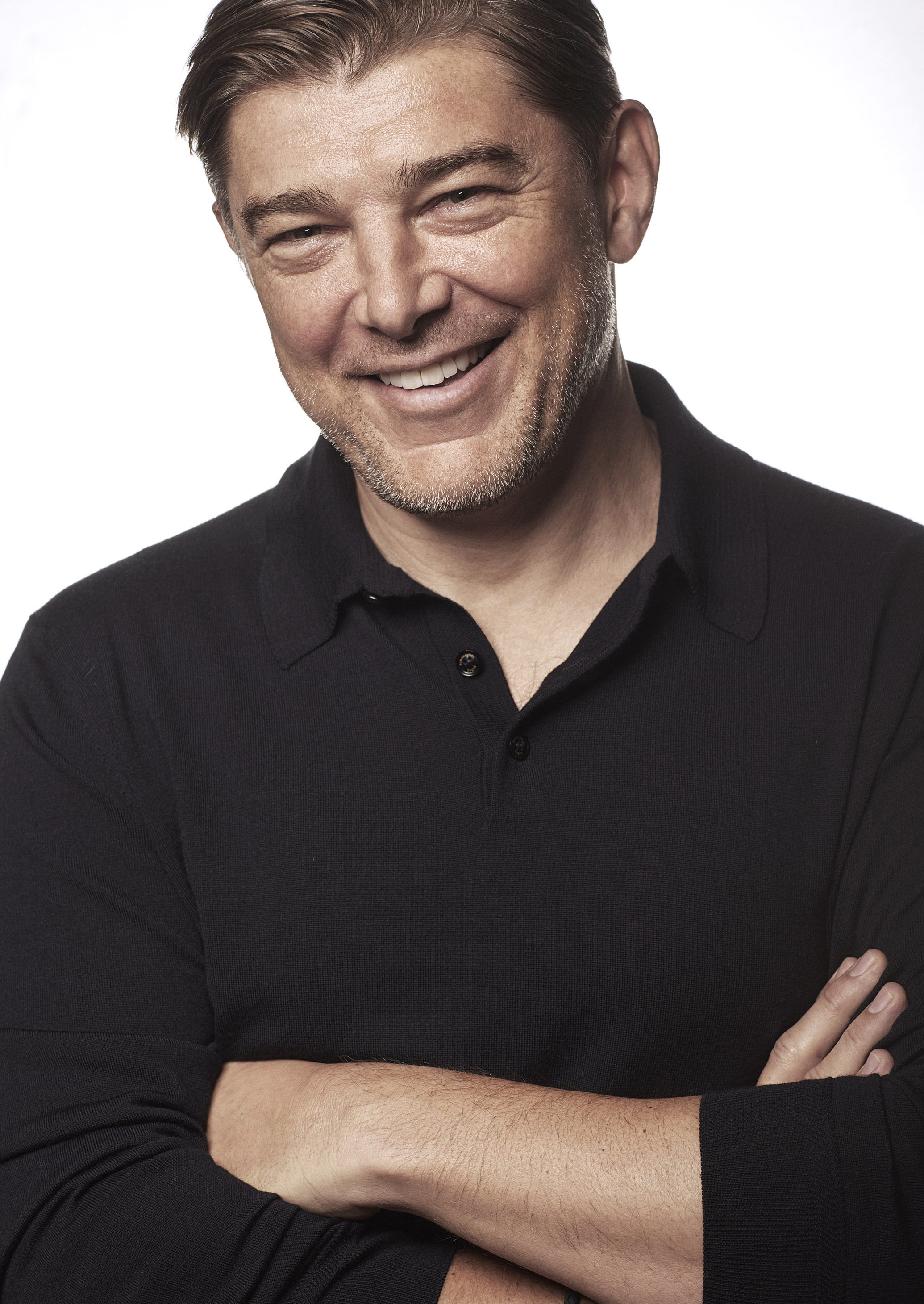
- Born: June 16, 1965 (age 59); London, England
- Occupation: Technology entrepreneur
- Years active: 1991-present
- Known for: Founder & (former) CEO of Thunderhead

Glen Manchester (born 16 June 1965), is a technology pioneer, innovator and entrepreneur. He is best known as being the founder & Chief Executive Officer of Thunderhead, a private employee-owned British technology company now owned by Medallia Inc.

== Early life ==
Manchester, an only child, was born in St John's Wood, London. Diagnosed as dyslexic, he was educated at Picardy Secondary Community School in Belvedere, Kent, until he was 17. Manchester then worked as a Ghillie on a Highland Estate in Scotland beginning his business career with Xerox

== Career ==
He founded his first company, Geneva Digital, in 1991 aged 25. The company created customer communication solutions for the direct banking and insurance sectors. In 1999, Geneva Digital was acquired by Xenos Group (now Open Text Corporation), a public company and leading specialist in customer communications technology, based in North America. Manchester was appointed president and CEO

In 2001, Manchester founded and privately funded Thunderhead to develop a new generation of enterprise technology for customer engagement Sitting under the Thunderhead umbrella, the platform pioneered - and became the market leader in - Customer Communication Management (CCM). In this time, Smart Communications established itself as the industry standard for the G15 investment banks and global P&C insurance sectors, pioneered the use of cloud-based technology in the CCM marketplace and grew to become a successful global organization with operations throughout Europe, North America, Asia Pacific and Australia.

In September 2016, Manchester sold the Smart Communications division of Thunderhead to private equity firm Accel-KKR.

In 2016, Manchester then launched Thunderhead's next generation of technology, the ONE Engagement Hub. Developed in the company's Boston development hub in North America, the platform pioneered AI-based Customer Journey Orchestration and Journey Analytics designed to help businesses across all industries respond to in-the-moment customer requirements at scale.

Under Manchester's leadership, Thunderhead's ONE business grew from a disruptive start-up in 2016, to one of the fastest-growing privately owned UK technology companies, featuring in both the Sunday Times Tech Track 100, and the UK Deloitte Fast 50.

In February 2022 Manchester sold Thunderhead.

== Personal life ==
Manchester currently lives in the UK and is an aviation and motorsport enthusiast, backing his son (Jacks) Motorsport career. Glen sponsored the last trans-Atlantic Lancaster Bomber flight in 2014 to support the Canadian War Heritage museum. He was part of the RCAF crew on this last-ever light transatlantic crossing flight from RAF Coningsby in the UK to Hamilton, Canada. He married Lithuanian model Asta Valentaitė on 8/25/2022.
