= Manchester High School (Connecticut) =

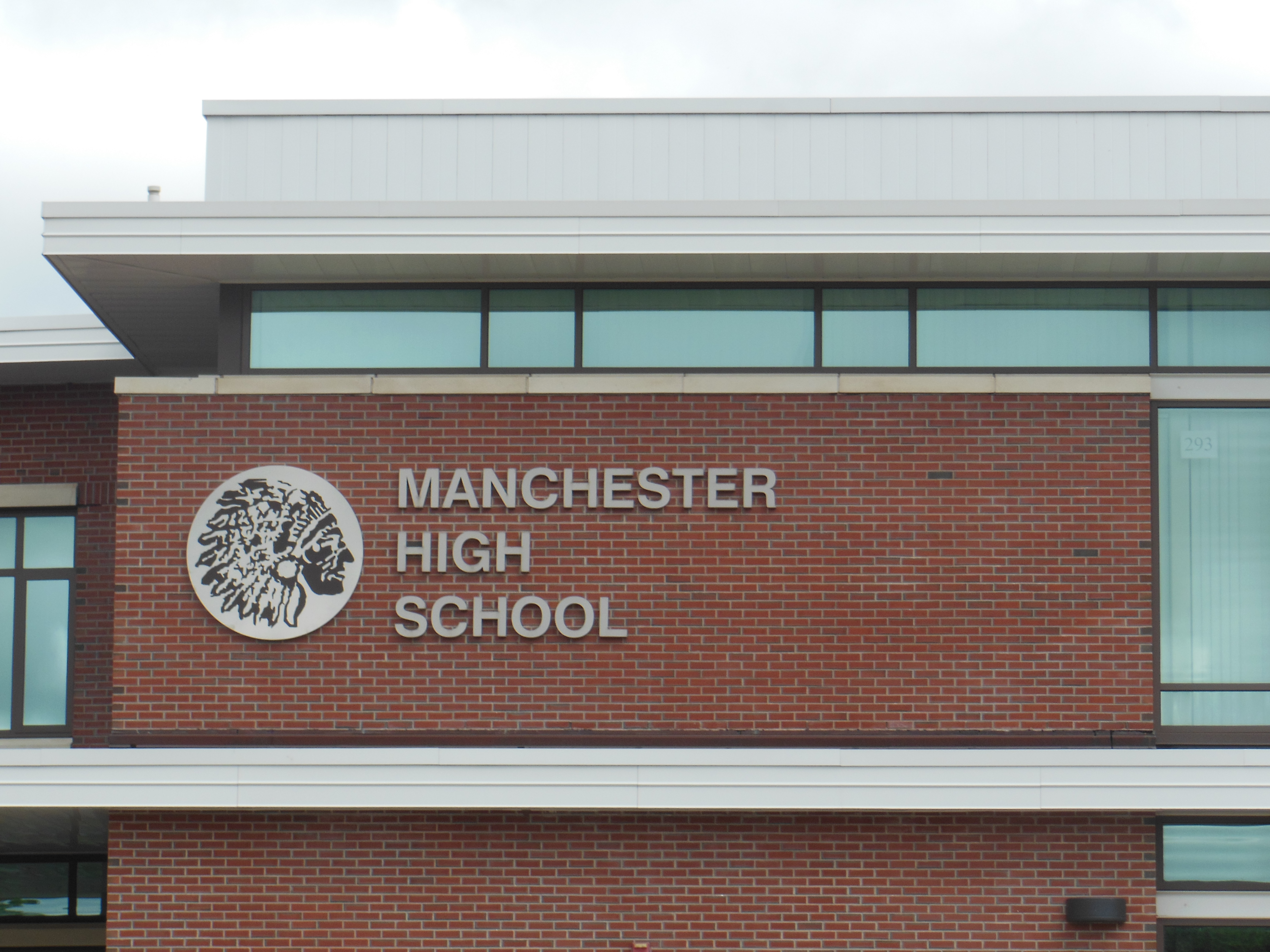

Location
- 134 East Middle Turnpike; Manchester, Connecticut 06040; United States; 41°47′03″N 72°31′07″W

Information
- Type: Public high school
- Motto: Mastering High Standards (acronymic)
- Established: 1893 (133 years ago)
- School district: Manchester Public Schools
- Superintendent: Matthew Geary
- CEEB code: 070380
- Principal: Katelyn Miner
- Teaching staff: 159.20 (FTE)
- Grades: 9-12
- Enrollment: 1,739 (2023-2024)
- Student to teacher ratio: 10.92
- Colors: Red, black, white, and gray
- Team name: Red Hawks
- Newspaper: The Harbinger
- Yearbook: SOMANHIS or The MHS Yearbook
- Media: Manchester Television News; MHS Morning Announcements
- Website: mhs.mpspride.org

Manchester High School is a public high school located in Manchester, Connecticut, United States. It serves 1,700 students in the Manchester Public School system.

== History ==
Manchester High School was founded in 1893 with Fred A. Verplanck serving as the school's first principal. The first graduating class of 1894 had a total of six students. The school was held in the Ninth District School, where Bennet Academy is located today. In 1902, the wealthy Cheney family offered to construct a new high school building to accommodate the students' needs. In 1904, the new South Manchester High School opened on Main Street. The four-story building is in the Colonial Revival architecture style, with columns, cornices, and an arched entrance; these elaborate architectural details were designed by architects Hartwell, Richardson & Driver of Boston. The building included all of the modern amenities of the time. It was dedicated in December 1904. The Town of Manchester purchased the property, and the school, from the Cheney family in 1928, when the school became Manchester High School.

The yearbook, SOMANHIS (South Manchester High School), was founded in 1915. Volume 100 was released in 2015.

In 1956, a new campus on East Middle Turnpike opened. The graduating class of 1956 was the last class to graduate from the "old" school. The new Manchester High School is much larger than the original building, and was a state-of-the-art facility when it first opened. At the time of the opening of the new high school, Manchester High School was the largest secondary school in New England. In 2024, it is the current campus of Manchester High School. Most of the classrooms, as well as the library and main office, are located in the "quadrangle", a set of four hallways connected to make a square. The cafeteria is next to the Brookfield Street parking lot and has its own entrance and lobby. The gymnasium is next to the cafeteria, and the pool and an additional gym are nearby. Also on the campus are baseball and softball fields, a soccer/football field, and a track.

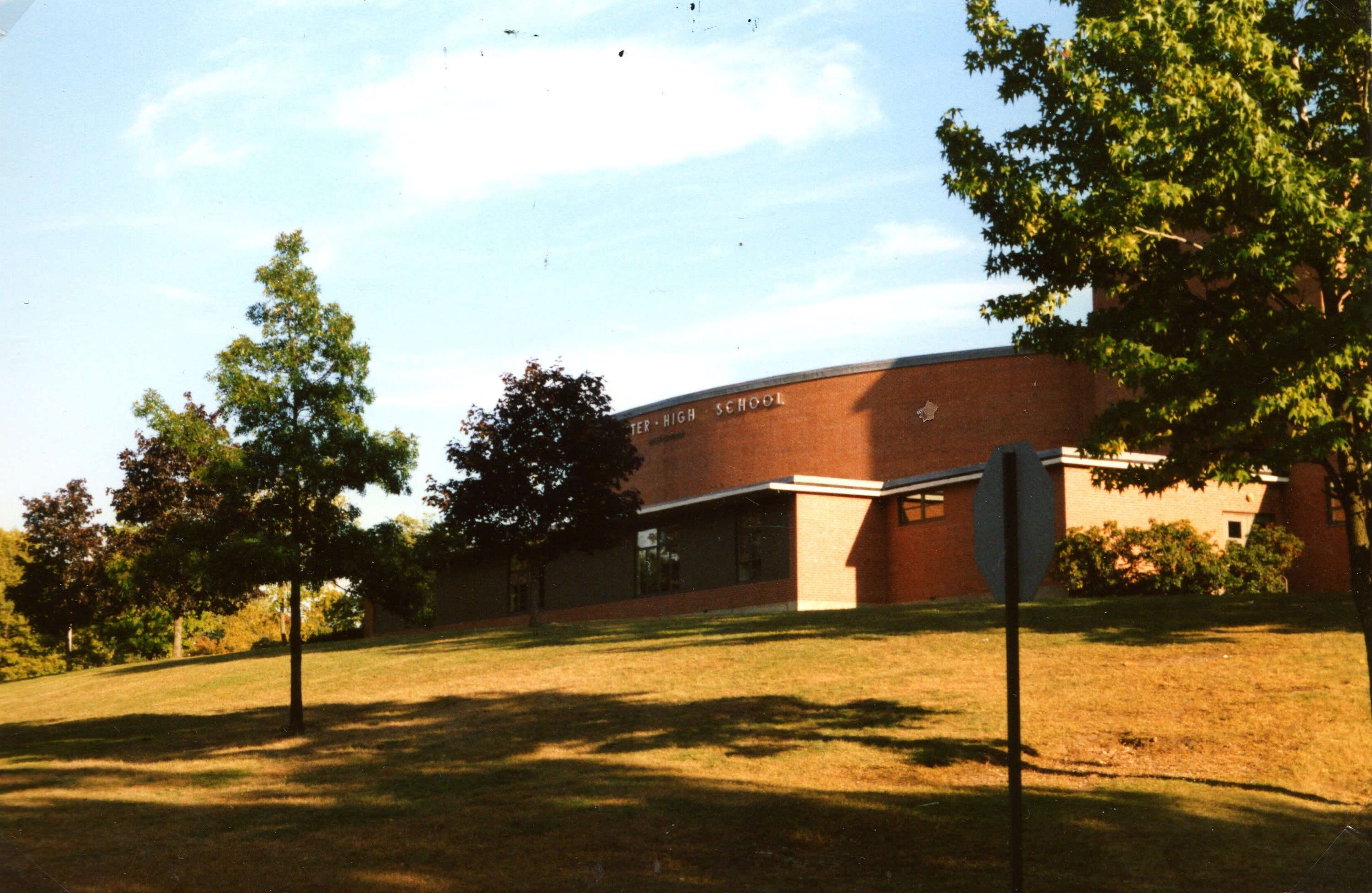
Manchester High School's Bailey Auditorium in 1988, from East Middle Turnpike.

The school's first renovation took place in the 1980s, with a new wing being added as well as maintenance to keep up with safety regulations. This wing now houses the Bentley Alternative Education School.

In 2007, a major expansion and renovation took place with the purpose of relieving the school's congestion. The main component of the expansion, the Freshman Center (commonly referred to as the freshman wing), extends off one of the quadrangle's hallways and contains classrooms, science labs, computer labs, and a presentation room. The freshman wing is air-conditioned, unlike the rest of the school. Additional parts of the school were renovated, namely the 1100-seat Bailey Auditorium. The renovation brought a new stage, re-upholstered seats, air conditioning, and a new state-of-the-art sound system to Bailey Auditorium. The cafeteria was also expanded during the renovation, as well as the School Store and Student Activities office. The freshman wing and new auditorium and cafeteria opened for the 2007-2008 school year, with a celebratory concert held in the just-renovated Bailey Auditorium. A ribbon-cutting ceremony accompanied the opening of the freshman wing on September 4, 2007.

== Demographics ==
Manchester High School is regarded under the No Child Left Behind Act as having a school poverty percentage of 46% and a school minority percentage of 49.4%. These numbers are based on the Connecticut Academic Performance Test results from 2011 and reflect the 10th grade class evaluated during that testing cycle.

== Sports ==
Manchester High School offers soccer, football, cross country, swimming, wrestling, indoor and outdoor track and field, basketball, baseball, softball, volleyball, golf, tennis, cheerleading and hockey. MHS's main sports rivals are Glastonbury High School, East Hartford High School, South Windsor High School, and East Catholic High School.

== Recent changes ==
Since 2012, Manchester High School has gone through major changes in an attempt to improve the school and increase safety.

=== Swipe ===
Starting in 2012, Manchester High School became a "Swipe school", meaning that students have to swipe their ID cards in a machine every morning to track attendance. Swipe cost $47,355 to implement and costs about $6,000 a year to maintain. Its purpose is to reduce the number of students skipping classes. "Classroom teachers will be able to identify students who come to school but do not attend classes," former principal (now superintendent) Matthew Geary said. "Teachers also will know if a student is in the library, nurse's office and other locations equipped with swiping stations." Juniors in good academic standing have the option of late arrival and early release in place of a study hall at the beginning or end of the day. Seniors in good academic standing also have the privilege of late arrival and early release; they also have the privilege of open campus, and can swipe out of the building for lunch, or if they do not have a class.

=== MHSRedline ===
In 2012, Manchester High School launched a new website, "MHSRedline". MHSRedline was created to be a contemporary, dynamic, and mobile-friendly school website. During the school year, it is updated daily with news and school updates, and MHSRedline Facebook, Twitter, and Instagram pages have been created to accompany the website.

== Notable alumni ==
- Nathan G. Agostinelli, politician and State Comptroller
- Elizabeth S. Anderson, philosopher and MacArthur Fellow
- Herman Bronkie, MLB third-baseman.
- Seth DeValve, NFL tight end.
- Michael Hartfield, American track and field Olympian.
- Leo Katkaveck, professional basketball and minor league baseball player.
- Bill Masse, MLB outfielder and Olympian.
- Joe McCluskey, American track and field Olympian.
- Moe Morhardt, MLB player.
- Tang Sauce, Hip hop recording artist, dancer and musician.
- Dr. Paul J. Turek, physician, surgeon and fertility specialist.
