= Joseph Young Jr. =

American cartoonist and animator (born 1964)

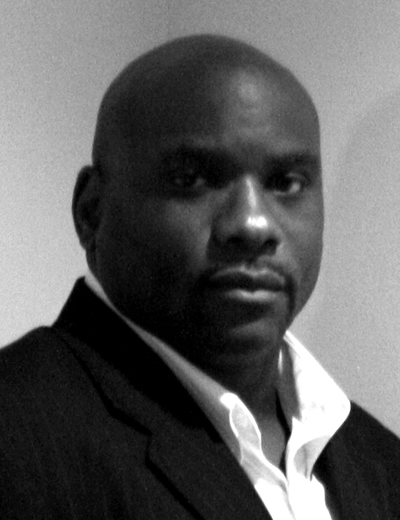
- Joseph Young Jr. Portrait 2007
- Born: Joseph Young Jr. December 29, 1964 Hartford, Connecticut; U.S.
- Areas: Cartoonist, Writer, Artist
- Notable works: Scruples (1989–Present)

Joseph Young Jr. (commonly known as Joe Young) is an American cartoonist and animator, who runs the Hartford Animation & Film Institute (HAFI). Young is the creator of the Scruples comic strip in the 1990s, and the strip's characters now star in the animated film that the institute completed in December [2006]. He is the father of Hip hop artist Tang Sauce.

== World's Longest Comic Strip ==
In 1999, Young created the World's Longest Comic Strip (also known as the World's Largest Comic Strip). The comic strip features Young's Scruples characters. The strip is 8 feet tall and 100 yards long. In 1999, he received the Daily Point of Light Award from the White House.
