= Manchester score =

System of assessing small-cell lung cancer

Manchester score is an indicator of prognosis in small cell lung cancer. It is calculated from a number of physical and biochemical markers.

A patient with small cell lung cancer scores one point for each of the following: -

- Serum lactate dehydrogenase exceeds the upper limit of the reference range.
- Serum sodium concentration less than 132 mmol/L.
- Serum alkaline phosphatase over one-and-a-half times the upper limit of the reference range.
- Serum bicarbonate less than 24.
- Karnofsky performance status less than 60.
- Extensive stage disease.

== Prognosis ==
Prognosis of small cell lung cancer according to Manchester score
Manchester score	Prognostic group	Two year survival (%)
0-1	Good	16.2
2-3	Medium	2.5
4 or more	Poor	0
