= Manchester Academy (disambiguation) =

Manchester Academy is a music venue on campus of the University of Manchester.

Manchester Academy may also refer to:

- Manchester Academy, the old name of Harris Manchester College, Oxford
- Manchester Academy (secondary school), in inner city Manchester
- Manchester Academy of Fine Arts, in Manchester, UK

== See also ==
- Manchester Middle Academy, a school in Manchester, Connecticut, United States
