= Manchester (barque) =

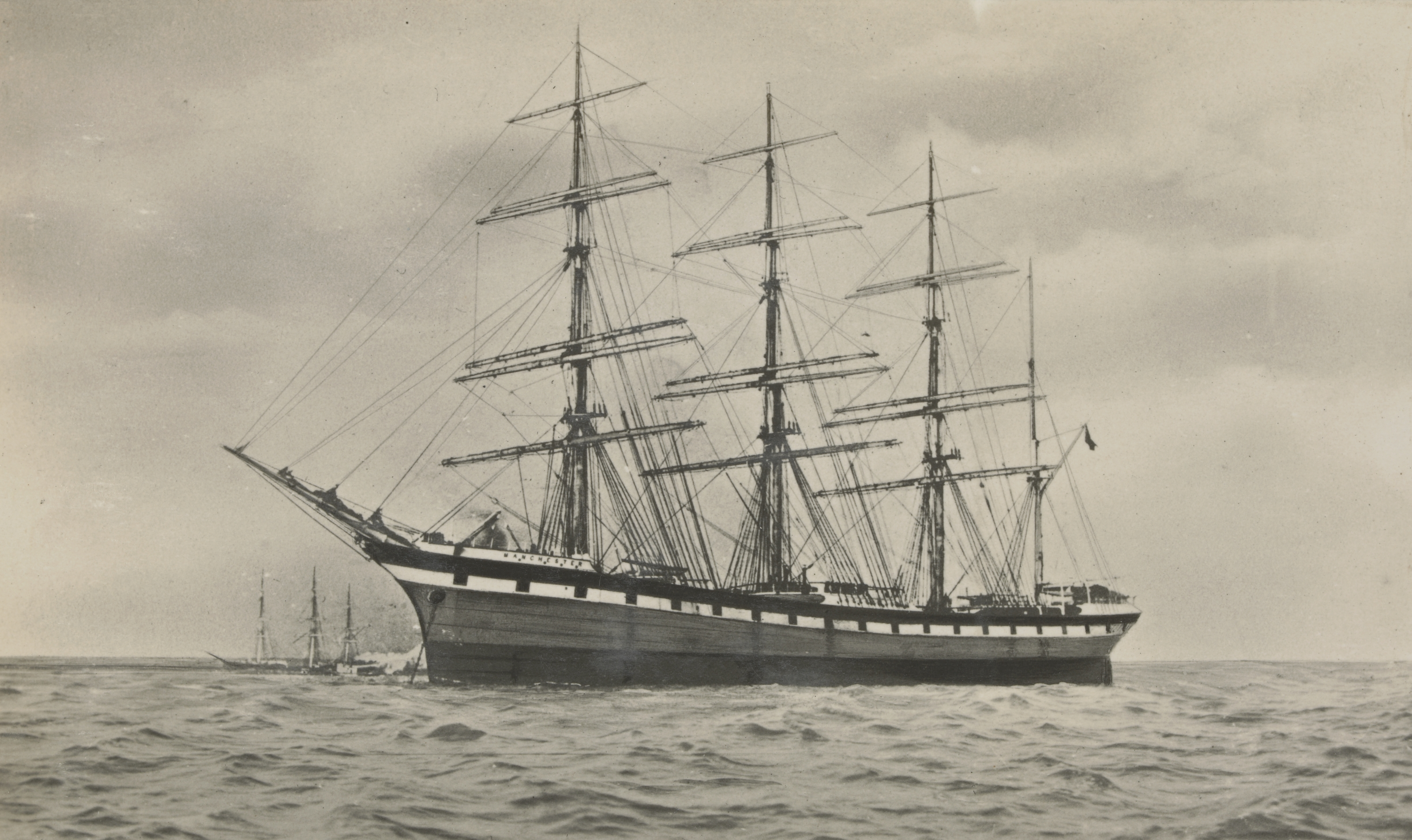
- Manchester

History

United Kingdom
- Name: Manchester
- Owner: Galgate Shipping Co.
- Operator: John Joyce & Co.
- Port of registry: Liverpool
- Route: Liverpool – New York – Yokohama – Shanghai
- Builder: William Doxford & Sons, Sunderland
- Cost: £23,000
- Yard number: 211
- Launched: 17 December 1891
- Completed: March 1892
- Identification: UK official number 99391; code letters MNKL
- Fate: Last spoken 12N/29W 23 September 1900, for Yokohama. Wreckage discovered on Bikar Atoll, Marshall Islands, July, 1901
- Notes: Last sailing ship built by Doxford & Sons

General characteristics
- Tonnage: 3,046 GRT, 2,851 NRT
- Length: 312.7 ft (95.3 m)
- Beam: 46.8 ft (14.3 m)
- Draught: 23 ft (7.0 m)
- Depth: 25.6 ft (7.8 m)
- Decks: 2
- Installed power: Sails
- Sail plan: Barque
- Crew: 31

Manchester was a four-masted, steel-hulled British barque which was wrecked in late 1900 on the reefs of Bikar Atoll, Marshall Islands.

== History ==
The Manchester was built at the shipyards of William Doxford & Sons in Sunderland, England in 1892. She was built with a steel hull and four masts for Galgate Shipping Company of Liverpool.

Despite waning interest in sailing cargo ships, particularly after the opening of the Suez Canal in 1869, the shipbuilders of Doxford & Sons felt there might be continuing interest in full rigged steel barque. They felt time factor was of less importance than creating economy through increased deadweight capacity. However, buyers largely preferred steam ships such as Doxford's own new Turret deck ship designs, and the Manchester was their last sailing ship. Unlike fine lined clipper ships at the height of the age of sail, the Manchester was a broad beamed vessel with deep draught, built for capacity rather than speed.

Typical of her voyages was a contract to deliver case oil (kerosene) from New York to Yokohama for Standard Oil, departing 3 September 1899, arriving 7 December 1899.

== Captains ==
John Joyce & Co.

- 1894, J.C. Dodd
- 1895, J. Belyea
- 1896, D. Evans
- 1897–1900, S. Forrest
- 1900–1901, N.F. Clemens

== Final voyage ==
On 21 August 1900, the Manchester left New York City for Yokohama, loaded with 4,515 tons of kerosene. There were 30 crew members aboard, plus Captain N. Frank Clemens and his wife and two daughters who were passengers. Based on the length of her and other barques' previous voyages, the Manchester might have been expected to reach Yokohama in January or February 1901, but she never arrived. Her disappearance was reported to Lloyds, and she was assumed to be lost in a typhoon. In July 1901, a Marshall Islands trading schooner discovered wreckage of the Manchester on Bikar Atoll. Footprints and marks of two boat keels on the sand, together with other signs, suggested that the crew, Clemens, and his family had been on the island and, unable to find sufficient water had pushed off again. It was supposed that they died of thirst before reaching inhabited islands.

An estimation of the remaining sailing time to reach Yokohama might have dated the shipwreck to late December 1900 or early January 1901. Given that ship's boats keel marks and foot prints were still visible in the sand in July, the crew may have been marooned for six months, departing a few days before the arrival of the trading schooner.

A maritime board of inquiry assembled in Liverpool on 16 and 17 October 1901, to investigate the circumstances of the loss of the Manchester. The evidence suggested that the ship was in good seaworthy condition, had adequate crew, and was properly loaded and ballasted. The board was unable to conclude what caused the loss of the vessel. It was evidently unaware of the discovery of the wreckage, reported in the New York Times two days earlier.
