= Manchester Road =

Manchester Road can refer to (among many roads with this name):

- Parts of the A6 road in England
- Parts of the A57 road in England
- Part of the A1206 road in London
- Part of Missouri Route 100 in the USA
