= Manchester GATE =

Coordinates: 36°47′15.7″N 119°46′58.9″W

Manchester G.A.T.E.
- Fresno, California; United States

Information
- Motto: "Quench Your Thirst For Knowledge- Try G.A.T.E.r- Ade"
- School district: Fresno Unified School District
- Grades: 2–6
- Enrollment: 734 (2016-17)
- Student to teacher ratio: 26:1
- Colors: blue and green
- Team name: G.A.T.E.Rs

Manchester GATE is an elementary school in Fresno, California. It has won many awards including one in Redbook. The principal is Ian Gough and the vice principal is Alanna Cha. G.A.T.E. is an acronym for Gifted and Talented Education. Manchester GATE serves grades 2–6. With a student-teacher ratio of 26:1, Manchester GATE had an enrollment of 739 students in 2007.

In 2007, Manchester GATE received the National No Child Left Behind Title I Distinguished Schools Recognition Award. It was only one of two schools in California to receive this award for that school year.

In 2012, Manchester GATE achieved an Academic Performance Index Score of 998, which tied three other public elementary schools for the highest elementary school scores in California.
