= Manchester Township =

Manchester Township may refer to:

== United Kingdom ==
- Manchester (ancient township), in England

== United States ==
- Manchester Township, Dallas County, Arkansas, in Dallas County, Arkansas
- Manchester Township, Boone County, Illinois
- Manchester Township, Dearborn County, Indiana
- Manchester Township, Michigan
- Manchester Township, Freeborn County, Minnesota
- Manchester Township, New Jersey, in Ocean County
- Manchester Township, Passaic County, New Jersey
- Manchester Township, Cumberland County, North Carolina
- Manchester Township, Adams County, Ohio
- Manchester Township, Morgan County, Ohio
- Manchester Township, York County, Pennsylvania
- Manchester Township, Wayne County, Pennsylvania
- Manchester Township, Kingsbury County, South Dakota, in Kingsbury County, South Dakota
