= Manchester School of Technology =

Coordinates: 42°57′48″N 71°25′55″W

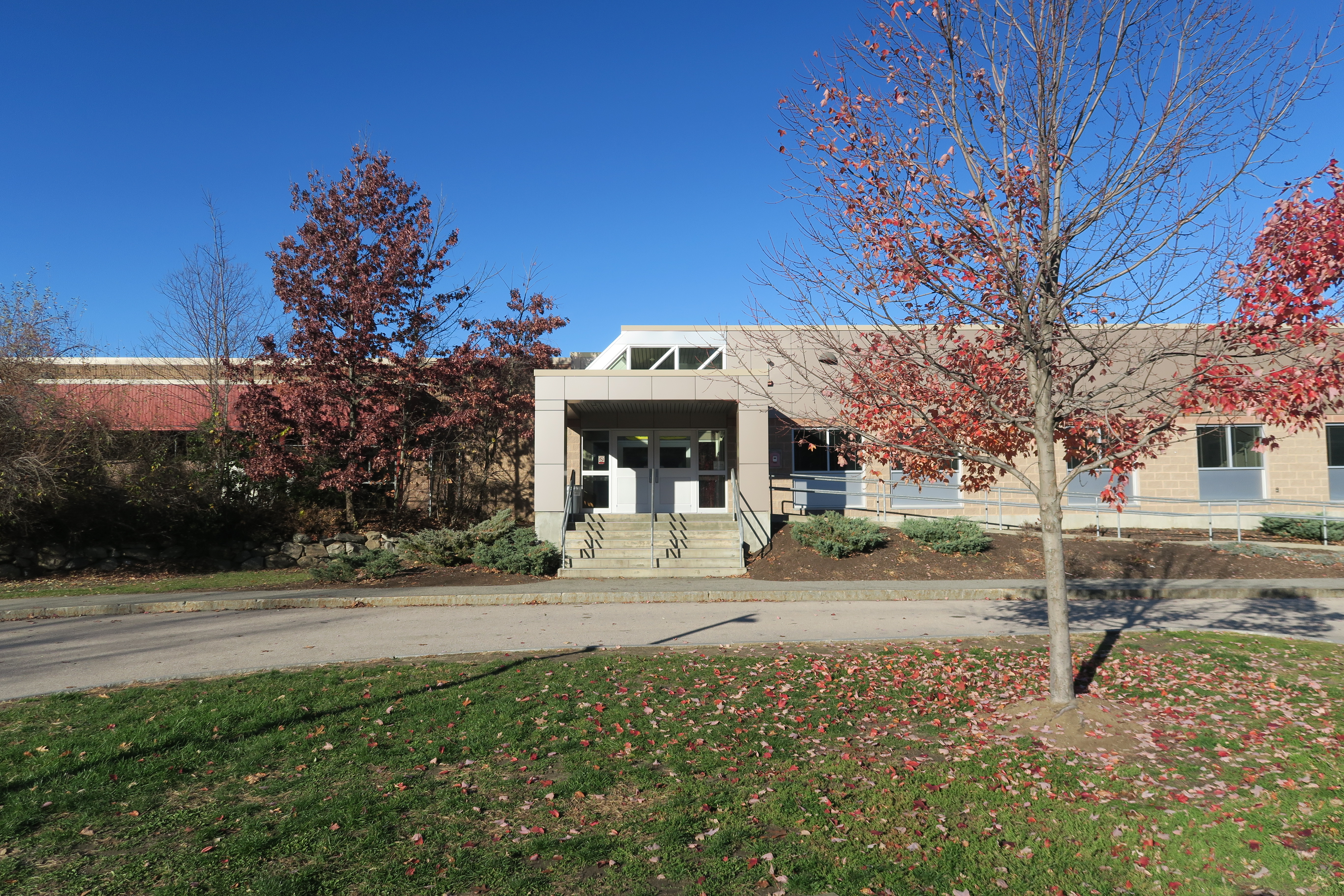

Location
- 100 Gerald Connors Circle; Manchester, New Hampshire; USA

Information
- Type: Career and technical school
- Established: 1982/2012
- School district: Manchester School District
- Principal: Timothy Otis
- Staff: 26.80 (FTE)
- Enrollment: 304 (2023-2024)
- Student to teacher ratio: 11.34
- Campus: Urban
- Website: mst.mansd.org

The Manchester School of Technology (MST) is a high school located at 100 Gerald Connors Circle, in Manchester, New Hampshire, United States, part of the Manchester School District. In addition to the typical high school courses, Manchester School of Technology offers courses called "Careers in Technology and Engineering" (CTE), which are programs of study that focus on applied applications, rather than the theoretical or abstract. These CTE classes are typically taken in the 10th and 11th grade, though can be taken in the 12th grade as well. The instructors for the CTE programs experienced in the trade they teach, having worked in the field and bring their own job experience to their classes. The classrooms of the CTE programs offer the tools used in the workforce that a student would need to be acquainted with.

Until its establishment of the dedicated high school in 2012, the Manchester School of Technology only offered CTE classes to 11th and 12th grade students in addition to their studies at other high schools.

== Career and Technical Education ==
- Business/Marketing
  - Applied Business Management
  - Academy of Finance
  - Sports & Entertainment Marketing
- Communications
  - Design Communication
  - Graphic and Game Design
  - Video Production
- Construction
  - Landscape / Horticulture
  - Electrical Technology
  - Residential Carpentry
  - Residential Plumbing & HVAC
- Mechanical/Technology
  - Automotive Technology
  - Collision Repair / Refinish Technology
  - Architecture & Civil Engineering
  - Manufacturing Technology
- Services
  - Early Childhood Education
  - Cosmetology
  - Culinary Arts
  - Basic Culinary
  - Public Safety
  - Health Science Technology Education
