= Kabua =

Kabua is a surname of Marshallese origin. It may refer to:

- Amata Kabua (1928–1996), first president of the Marshall Islands
- Amatlain Elizabeth Kabua (born 1951), Marshallese diplomat and politician
- David Kabua (1951–2026), President of the Marshall Islands (2020–2024)
- Emlain Kabua (1928–2023), first lady of the Marshall Islands
- Imata Kabua (1943–2019), second president of the Marshall Islands
- Kabua the Great (died 1910), paramount chief (Iroijlaplap) of the Ralik chain of the Marshall Islands
- Kabua Kabua (1910–1994), Marshallese paramount chief and jurist
- Kitlang Kabua (born 1991), Marshallese politician
