= Marshall Islands at the 2017 World Aquatics Championships =

- Flag of the Marshall Islands
- FINA code: MHL
- National federation: Marshall Islands Swimming Federation

in Budapest, Hungary
- Competitors: 3 in 1 sport
- Medals: Gold 0 Silver 0 Bronze 0 Total 0

World Aquatics Championships appearances
- 1973; 1975; 1978; 1982; 1986; 1991; 1994; 1998; 2001; 2003; 2005; 2007; 2009; 2011; 2013; 2015; 2017; 2019; 2022; 2023; 2024

The Marshall Islands competed at the 2017 World Aquatics Championships in Budapest, Hungary from 14 July to 30 July.

== Swimming ==
Marshall Islands has received a Universality invitation from FINA to send three swimmers (two men and one woman) to the World Championships.

Athlete	Event	Heat		Semifinal		Final	
Athlete	Event	Time	Rank	Time	Rank	Time	Rank
Phillip Kinono	Men's 50 m freestyle	30.75	118	did not advance			
Phillip Kinono	Men's 100 m freestyle	1:12.94	112	did not advance			
Colleen Furgeson	Women's 50 m freestyle	28.32	61	did not advance			
Colleen Furgeson	Women's 50 m breaststroke	36.97	42	did not advance			
Ann-Marie Hepler	Women's 100 m freestyle	1:04.01	68	did not advance			
Ann-Marie Hepler	Women's 50 m butterfly	30.02	=45	did not advance			
