= Marshall Islands at the 2015 World Aquatics Championships =

- Flag of the Marshall Islands
- FINA code: MHL
- National federation: Marshall Islands Swimming Federation

in Kazan, Russia
- Competitors: 3 in 1 sport
- Medals: Gold 0 Silver 0 Bronze 0 Total 0

World Aquatics Championships appearances
- 1973; 1975; 1978; 1982; 1986; 1991; 1994; 1998; 2001; 2003; 2005; 2007; 2009; 2011; 2013; 2015; 2017; 2019; 2022; 2023; 2024

Marshall Islands competed at the 2015 World Aquatics Championships in Kazan, Russia from 24 July to 9 August 2015.

== Swimming ==
Swimmers from the Marshall Islands have achieved qualifying standards in the following events (up to a maximum of 2 swimmers in each event at the A-standard entry time, and 1 at the B-standard):

Men

Athlete	Event	Heat		Semifinal		Final	
Athlete	Event	Time	Rank	Time	Rank	Time	Rank
Giordan Harris	50 m freestyle	26.18	83	did not advance			
Giordan Harris	100 m freestyle	57.75	99	did not advance			

Women

Athlete	Event	Heat		Semifinal		Final	
Athlete	Event	Time	Rank	Time	Rank	Time	Rank
Colleen Furgeson	100 m freestyle	1:05.18	83	did not advance			
Colleen Furgeson	50 m backstroke	33.04	45	did not advance			
Ann-Marie Hepler	50 m freestyle	28.52	79	did not advance			
Ann-Marie Hepler	50 m butterfly	30.02	52	did not advance			
