= Marshall Islands at the 2019 World Aquatics Championships =

- Flag of the Marshall Islands
- FINA code: MHL
- National federation: Marshall Islands Swimming Federation

in Gwangju, South Korea
- Competitors: 3 in 1 sport
- Medals: Gold 0 Silver 0 Bronze 0 Total 0

World Aquatics Championships appearances
- 1973; 1975; 1978; 1982; 1986; 1991; 1994; 1998; 2001; 2003; 2005; 2007; 2009; 2011; 2013; 2015; 2017; 2019; 2022; 2023; 2024

Marshall Islands competed at the 2019 World Aquatics Championships in Gwangju, South Korea from 12 to 28 July.

== Swimming ==
Marshall Islands entered three swimmers.

Men

Athlete	Event	Heat		Semifinal		Final	
Athlete	Event	Time	Rank	Time	Rank	Time	Rank
Phillip Kinono	50 m freestyle	29.25	124	did not advance			
Phillip Kinono	50 m backstroke	41.27	74	did not advance			

Women

Athlete	Event	Heat		Semifinal		Final	
Athlete	Event	Time	Rank	Time	Rank	Time	Rank
Colleen Furgeson	50 m backstroke	33.28	38	did not advance			
Colleen Furgeson	100 m backstroke	1:13.64	58	did not advance			
Ann-Marie Hepler	50 m freestyle	29.63	78	did not advance			
Ann-Marie Hepler	50 m butterfly	30.77	50	did not advance			
