= Kabua Kabua =

Marshallese paramount chief and jurist (1910–1994)

Iroijlaplap Kabua Kabua
- Kabua in 1980

Presiding Judge of the Marshall Islands District Court
- In office ?–1986?

President of the Council of Iroij
- In office c. 1953–?

Iroijlaplap
- In office ? – 8 October 1994

Personal details
- Born: c. June/July 1910; Marshall Islands
- Died: 8 October 1994 (aged 84); Marshall Islands
- Profession: Paramount chief · jurist

Kabua Kabua (c. June/July 1910 – 8 October 1994) was a Marshallese paramount chief (Iroijlaplap) and jurist. He was a leading judge and served from the 1930s until his retirement in 1986. He served under Japanese rule, American rule, and for the Marshall Islands as they became an independent country. He also served on the Congress of the Marshall Islands and was the president of the Council of Iroij, a chamber of the Congress.

== Biography ==
Kabua was born in c. June or July 1910 in the Marshall Islands. The son of Laelan, he was the grandson of King Kabua the Great, who died shortly after his birth. He was named in honor of his grandfather. He could speak English, Marshallese, and Japanese.

Kabua, as a member of the royal family, became one of the Marshallese iroijlaplaps (paramount chiefs); he said in a 1978 interview that "Half the people of the Marshall Islands belong to me." He also thus was the head of his clan. According to the Pacific Daily News, he held authority over the islands in the south as well as some in the central and western Marshalls. The Los Angeles Times described him as being the chief of "the two islands known throughout the world – Bikini and Eniwetok." As iroijlaplap, Kabua received a portion of all the Marshallese revenue generated from copra production, and he was also "constantly being sent gifts by his people – food, woven mats, hand-carved ships and many handcraft items," according to the Times.

In the early 1930s, Kabua became a judge for the Marshall Islands, while they were under the rule of the Japanese. He became the chief magistrate of Jaluit Atoll in 1937. He remained a judge during World War II and after the U.S. took over the islands after the war, being described by the Times as "probably the only person ever to serve as a judge under both the Japanese and U.S. judicial systems."

In the 1950s, Kabua was a member of the Council of Iroij, a chamber of the Congress of the Marshall Islands, and served as its president in 1953. After the Congress was reorganized as unicameral in 1958, he served as a member of the Congress representing Ailinglaplap Atoll in 1966. Considered a "highly respected jurist" and an "elder statesman" in the Marshall Islands, he often assisted Robert Shoecraft, the chief justice of the High Court of the Trust Territory of the Pacific, on court rulings relating to traditional matters. Kabua served on the Marshall Islands District Court and had become the presiding judge of the court by 1972. In this role, he was the highest judge for the islands. In 1974, he served on the Marshall Islands Political Status Commission, which discussed the future of the then-U.S. territory; the islands achieved independence in 1979. Kabua remained a judge for the District Court until his retirement in 1986.

Kabua was married three times and had 17 children. He also had 28 grandchildren by 1973. He married his third wife, Kiyoko, in 1945, and had 12 children with her. In September 1975, he and his wife were involved in a domestic argument and he beat her, with her dying of a cerebral hemorrhage soon after. He was initially charged with murder, later changed to involuntary manslaughter, and a trial was held in March 1976. He was acquitted. An article from the Pacific Daily News noted that "the Marshallese jury trial ran into a host of problems related to the touchy issue of 'the law' dealing with an obvious social superior," and one lawyer noted in the paper that "They just could not find one of their betters guilty."

From 1984 to 1994, Kabua was involved in an expensive legal dispute against his cousin Amata Kabua, the Marshallese president, over which iroij held authority over Kwajalein Atoll. The case involved several leading members of the Kabua family and cost several million dollars in legal fees. A Honolulu court recognized Amata as the paramount chief of Kwajalein in 1994.

Kabua died on 8 October 1994, at the age of 84. After his death, Amata Kabua declared a week of national mourning, with flags being flown at half-mast.
