= Jabor (Marshall Islands) =

- Town
- Location within Marshall Islands
- Coordinates: 5°55′15″N 169°38′36″E
- Atoll: Jaluit Atoll

Population
  - Total: 569

Jabor is a Marshallese town located in Jaluit Atoll.

The population of Jabor is 569. Jabor features a small hotel, small stores that sell staple foods, and a gasoline station. Jabor is a base for commercial and sports fishing, where motorboats can be rented.

Amata Kabua (first president of Marshall Islands) was born in Jabor.

Jabor has two elementary schools, St. Joseph's, which is affiliated with the Catholic Church, and Jabor Elementary School, a public school. There are also elementary schools in Jaluit motu and Iemej. Jaluit High School is a secondary boarding school serving students from Jaluit Atoll and the southern atolls of the Marshall Islands, including Ebon, Ailinglaplap, Namu, Kili, Namdrik and Jabat.

Jaluit Airport is served by Air Marshall Islands.

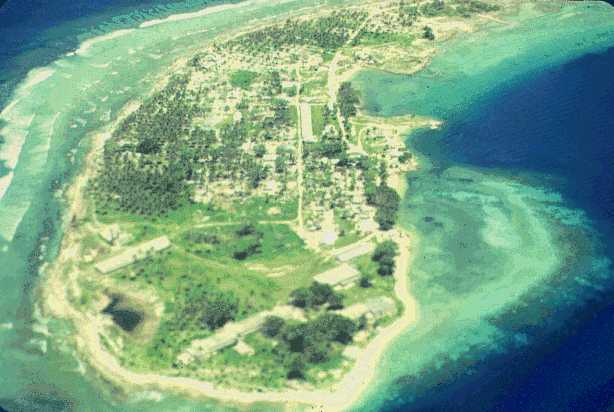
Oblique aerial photo of 1978, from north

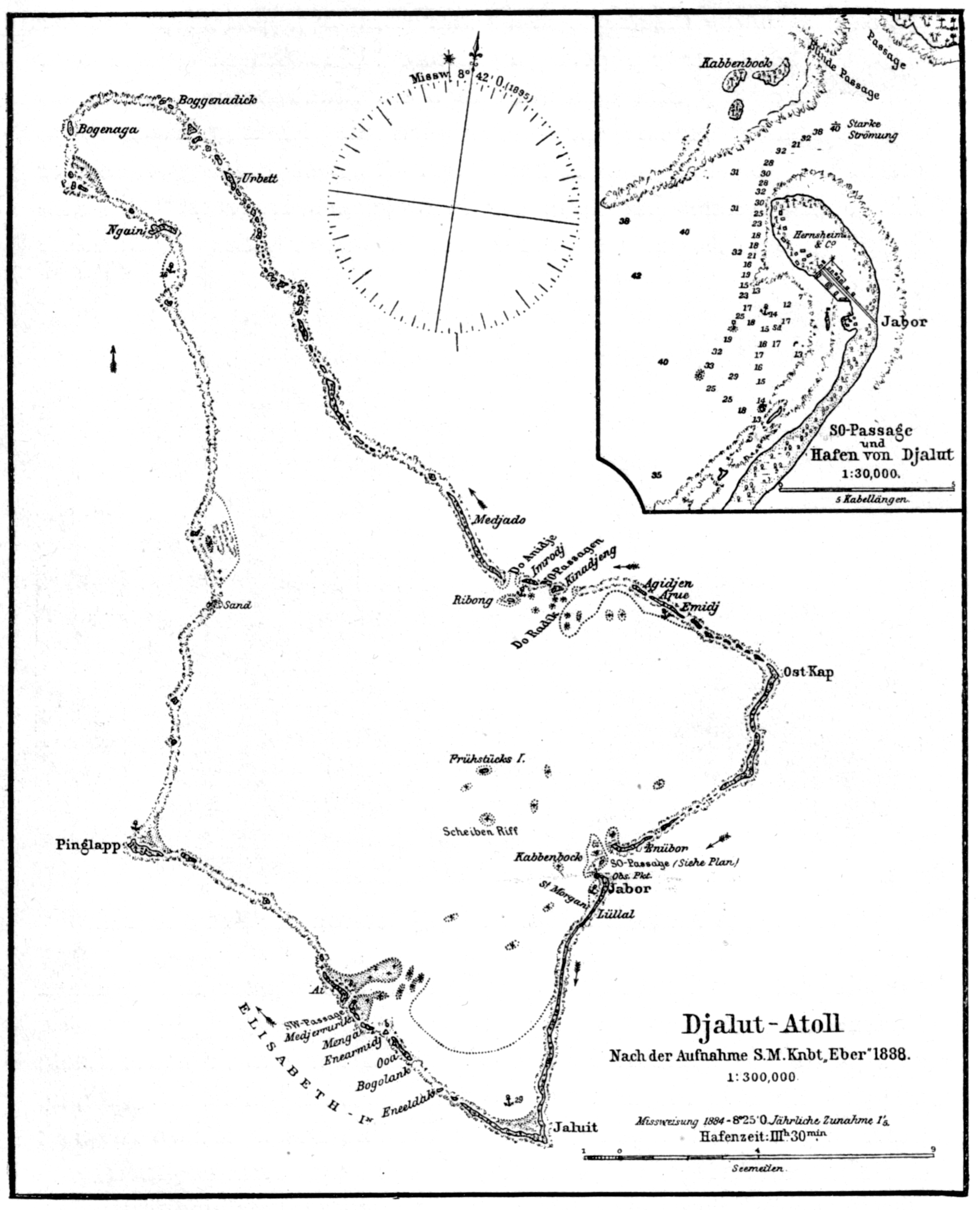
German 1906 map of Jaluit Atoll, with map inset of Jabor
