= Marshall Islands at the 2023 World Aquatics Championships =

- Flag of the Marshall Islands
- FINA code: MHL
- National federation: Marshall Islands Swimming Federation

in Fukuoka, Japan
- Competitors: 2 in 1 sport
- Medals: Gold 0 Silver 0 Bronze 0 Total 0

World Aquatics Championships appearances
- 1973; 1975; 1978; 1982; 1986; 1991; 1994; 1998; 2001; 2003; 2005; 2007; 2009; 2011; 2013; 2015; 2017; 2019; 2022; 2023; 2024

Marshall Islands competed at the 2023 World Aquatics Championships in Fukuoka, Japan from 14 to 30 July.

== Swimming ==
Swimmers from the Marshall Islands have achieved qualifying standards in the following events.

Men

Athlete	Event	Heat		Semifinal		Final	
Athlete	Event	Time	Rank	Time	Rank	Time	Rank
Phillip Kinono	50 m freestyle	27.72	104	Did not advance			
Phillip Kinono	100 m freestyle	1:03.13	112	Did not advance			

Women

Athlete	Event	Heat		Semifinal		Final	
Athlete	Event	Time	Rank	Time	Rank	Time	Rank
Kayla Hepler	100 m freestyle	1:09.01	72	Did not advance			
Kayla Hepler	50 m backstroke	34.73	56	Did not advance			
