= Loeak =

Loeak (/ˈlɔɪˌæk/) is a Marshallese surname. Notable people with the surname include:

- Albert Loeak (died 1976), Marshallese chief
- Anjua Loeak (died 2016), one of four paramount chiefs in the Marshall Islands
- Christopher Loeak (born 1952), President of the Marshall Islands
