= Dorothy Kabua =

- Born: May 12, 1898; Arno Atoll
- Children: Amata Kabua

Dorothy Tarjikit Laelan Kabua (May 12, 1898 – ? ) was a Marshallese anti-nuclear testing activist. She was lerooj (queen or chieftain) of Marjuro Atoll and mother of the first president of the Marshall Islands, Amata Kabua. She also served on the Council of Iroij of the Nitijela, the Marshallese legislature.

She was born on May 12, 1898 on Arno Atoll. A member of the Raanjo clan, she married Irooj Laplap Lojjeilan Kabua.

In 1953, she was the first indigenous person to address the Trusteeship Council of the Trust Territory of the Pacific Islands at the United Nations in New York City, speaking against nuclear weapons testing in the Pacific islands. Her address was ignored as the next year the US conducted the Castle Bravo test at Bikini Atoll, exposing Marshall Islanders to nuclear fallout. She and other Marshall Islanders petitioned the UN to cease nuclear testing, writing "Land means a great deal to the Marshallese. [...] It is the very life of the people. Take away their land and their spirits go also". The petition was rejected by the UN and the US continued nuclear weapons testing until 1958.
