= Jaluit Airport =

Airport in Marshall Islands

- IATA: UIT; ICAO: none; FAA LID: N55

Summary
- Serves: Jabor, Jaluit Atoll, Marshall Islands
- Elevation AMSL: 4 ft (1.2 m)
- Coordinates: 05°54′33″N 169°38′13.5″E
- Interactive map of Jaluit Airport

Runways
Direction	Length		Surface
Direction	ft	m	Surface
03/21	5,000	1,524	Gravel
- Source: Federal Aviation Administration

Jaluit Airport is a public use airstrip located one nautical mile (1.85 km) southwest of the village of Jabor on Jaluit Atoll, Marshall Islands. This airstrip is assigned the location identifier N55 by the FAA and UIT by the IATA.

== Facilities ==
Jaluit Airport is at an elevation of 4 feet (1.2 m) above mean sea level. The runway is designated 03/21 with a gravel surface measuring 5,000 by 60 feet (1,524 x 18 m). There are no aircraft based at Jaluit.

== Airlines and destinations ==
Air Marshall Islands connects Jaluit Airport to Marshall Islands International Airport (Majuro) and Mili Airport.
