= Amata Kabua =

President of the Marshall Islands from 1979 to 1996

Iroijlaplap Amata Kabua
- His Highness; His Excellency
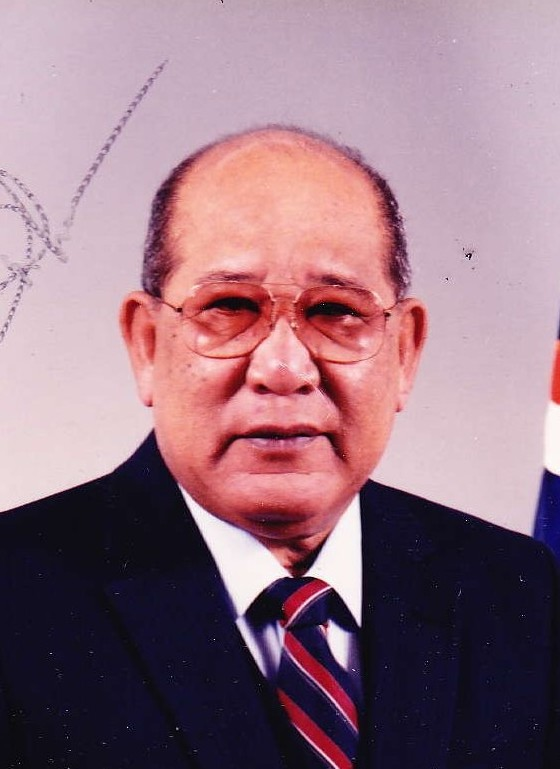

President of the Marshall Islands
- In office: November 17, 1979 – December 19, 1996
- Predecessor: Office created
- Successor: Kunio Lemari (Acting); Imata Kabua

Iroijlaplap of Kwajalein
- Reign: 1982 – December 19, 1996
- Predecessor: Joba Kabua
- Successor: Imata Kabua

President of the Micronesian Senate
- In office: 1969 – January 1973
- Predecessor: John O. Ngiraked
- Successor: Tosiwo Nakayama
- Born: November 17, 1928; Jaluit Atoll, South Seas Mandate
- Died: December 19, 1996 (aged 68); Honolulu, Hawaii, U.S.
- Spouse: Emlain Kabua
- Issue: 7, including David
- House: Kabua
- Father: Lejolan Kabua
- Mother: Dorothy Tarjikit

Iroijlaplap Amata Kabua (November 17, 1928 – December 19, 1996) was the first President of the Marshall Islands from 1979 until his death in 1996 (five consecutive terms).

== Background ==
Amata Kabua was a scion of Marshallese Royalty. Amata Kabua is the son of high chiefess Tarjikit of the Eastern (Ratak chain) and rumoured to be a Japanese administrator by his political opponents. This was disputed by his father Lejolan Kabua. However, by Marshallese custom of "kujen loje" (nobleman of birth), High Chief Lojelañ of the Ralik (Western) chain claimed Amata as his own in the same manner Loeak the Great adopted Lajore and Litilinej, probably because Laelan of Arno who is Dorothy Kabua's father was Kabua's biological child however, under "kujen loje", Laelan of Arno was adopted by Takto just as Laelan Kabua of the Erroja clan was adopted by Kabua (Lebon) under the same tradition as was Leit who was claimed by Iroij Bwio Jiba. Ironically, the "kujen loe" concept applied to Albert Loeak who was not the biological son of Lobokkij Loeak despite what many are led to believe as it also applied to Imata Kabua, Manini Kabua, Anjojo Kabua, Mike Kabua, Kabua Kabua, Laelan Kabua, Anjua Loeak, etc. but despite Amata's political visibility, he is more referenced, it is possible that racism is to blame as is political jealousy which is common in Marshallese politics.

Amata's father Chief (Iroij) Lejolañ Kabua was the son of Paramount Chief Iroij Bwio Jeimata Kabua of Northern Ralik (Western) Chain. Jeimata Kabua was the son of King Kabua the Great (nicknamed King John) with Leroij Bwio LiWodin. Kabua is also known as King John, who, on behalf of his father Iroij Bwio Jiba, led diplomatic relations between Germany and the Marshall Islands in 1885 through the Treaty of Friendship.

Amata Kabua's mother, Leroij Dorothy Tarjikit, was a paramount chieftain of Majuro with royal connections to the Rimwejoor and Raano clans who ruled the entire Ratak (eastern) chain but later lost Mejit. Tarjikit was regarded as a pure-blooded royal in equal rank to Jeimata Kabua and his father Kabua the Great because of her Bwio status. Tarjikit's father was a paramount chieftain named Laelañ of the Rimwejoor Clan in Arno and her mother was Leroij Bwio Maria of the Raano Clan of Majuro. Tarjikit's father High Chief Laelañ of the Ratak/Eastern chain is not to be confused with Bwirak Laelañ from the Erroja clan who was the stepson of Kabua the Great as liBwirak Neimekua was already pregnant with son Laelan Kabua when entering the Kabua household. The rule of incest was prevalent within this family and it was a key marriage alliance structure that allowed continued dominance through familial loyalties under the plain basis of existential circumstance. Jeimata's parents Leroij Pwieo Worin and Iroij Bwio Kabua were first cousins as were Tarjikit's parents Laelañ and Maria. And by extension, Tarjikit and Lejolan were first cousins also.

While Kabua the Great welcomed the Protestant missionaries safely on Ebon by offering his protection in 1850s under the guidance of his uncle Kaibuke thereby solidifying a royal connection to the Protestant faith, Tarjikit helped found the Catholic church in the Capital of the Marshall Islands thereby solidifying a royal connection to the Catholic faith.

Tarjikit was also the first indigenous Micronesian of the Trust Territory ever to attend a United Nations Trusteeship Council meeting in 1953 with her son Amata as interpreter. While Amata's mother became the first indigenous Micronesian to visit the United Nations, his father Lejolañ was the first Marshallese to visit the White House when he met with President Lyndon B. Johnson.

== Career ==
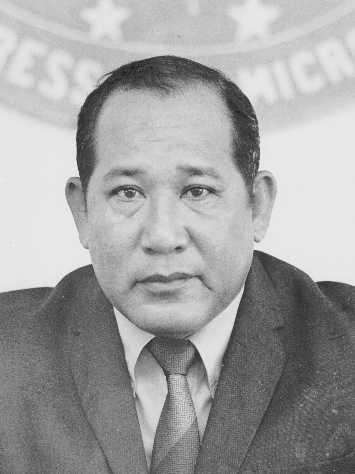
Kabua as Marshall Islands senator to the Congress of Micronesia, c. 1970

Amata began his career as a school teacher then as a Superintendent to Schools along with Chief Clerk for the House of Iroij in the 1950s. He was elected to the Council of Micronesia as a Representative and later as Senator to the Congress of Micronesia in 1963 where he also served one term as president for the Congress of Micronesia. Amata Kabua was the first president of the Marshall Islands in 1979 when its first constitution was implemented. That day was his 51st birthday. After his older brother Joba Kabua died in 1982, Amata Kabua inherited the Iroijlaplap title for Majuro Atoll in the domain of Kaibuke Tobinwa and certain parts of the Ralik Chain of the Marshall Islands in the domain of Jeimata Kabua. He later became the first president of the Marshall Islands when the nation received full independence in free association with the United States through the compact. He had been a principal participant in the negotiations to gain independence for the Marshall Islands and is regarded as the founding father of the modern nation by Marshallese. He wrote the words for the national anthem, "Forever Marshall Islands".

Amata Kabua was the son of a paramount chief of the Ralik Chain and a paramount chieftain of the Ratak Chain. He died in office after a long illness, on December 19, 1996, in Hawaii. He chose to be buried in his family property in Long Island going against royal burial traditions of Ralik & Ratak Chains as his Ralik family wanted him to be buried in the royal cemetery in Bouj, Ailinglaplap while his Majuro Kin wanted him to be buried in the royal cemetery in Laura. He chose to be buried in his family property in Long Island so his wife Emlain Kabua who is a commoner of the Ijidrik clan can be buried next to him because as a commoner, she will never be allowed to be buried in the royal cemetery in Laura, but her great-grandmother Limurelok (Kabua's wife) was buried in Bouj, Ailinglaplap in the Kabua cemetery. (Amata's older brother Joba Kabua also permitted his wife Jauni to be buried in the royal cemetery in Laura. However, due to certain restrictions, Jauni was not allowed her own space and thus shared the same burial spot with Joba Kabua having been buried on top of each other).

Political offices
Preceded by office created	President of the Marshall Islands; 1979–1996	Succeeded by Kunio Lemari
Regnal titles
Preceded by Joba Kabua	Iroijlaplap of Kwajalein; 1982–1996	Succeeded by Imata Kabua
