= Remios Hermios =

Marshallese chief

Remios Hermios is one of two iroijlaplap (or paramount chiefs) of the Ratak Chain in the Marshall Islands. His traditional domain includes the atolls of Aur, Maloelap, Erikub, Wotje, Likiep, Ailuk, Utirik and Taongi; he and his predecessors have also laid claim to U.S.-administered Wake Island. The other paramount chief in the chain is incumbent president, Jurelang Zedkaia, whose domain covers Majuro, Arno and Mili atolls.

Remios succeeded the chiefly title upon the death of his father, Murjel Hermios, in December 1998.
