= Jaluit High School =

Location
- Jaluit; Marshall Islands
- Coordinates: 5°55′24″N 169°38′28″E

Information
- Type: High school
- School district: Marshall Islands Public School System
- Website: web.archive.org/web/*/http://jhstech.weebly.com/

Jaluit High School (JHS) is a secondary school in Jabor, Jaluit Atoll, Marshall Islands. It is a part of the Marshall Islands Public School System.

The school serves the following atolls and islands in the south of the country: Jaluit, Ailinglaplap, Ebon, Jabat, Kili, Namdrik, and Namu.

It has a boarding program for students from distant atolls and islands.

== History ==
The first phase of the campus was built between the late 1960s to the middle of the 1970s, a period when several other public high schools were built in the Trust Territory of the Pacific Islands.

The school, the second public high school in the Marshall Islands, opened in 1975. The South Korean company Hanil built the campus. Initially it served grade 9 only and had 110 students.

In 1999 the Marshall Islands Journal published comments from a parent who criticized the dormitories of Jaluit High.
