= Kabua the Great =

Marshall Islands king and iroijlaplap

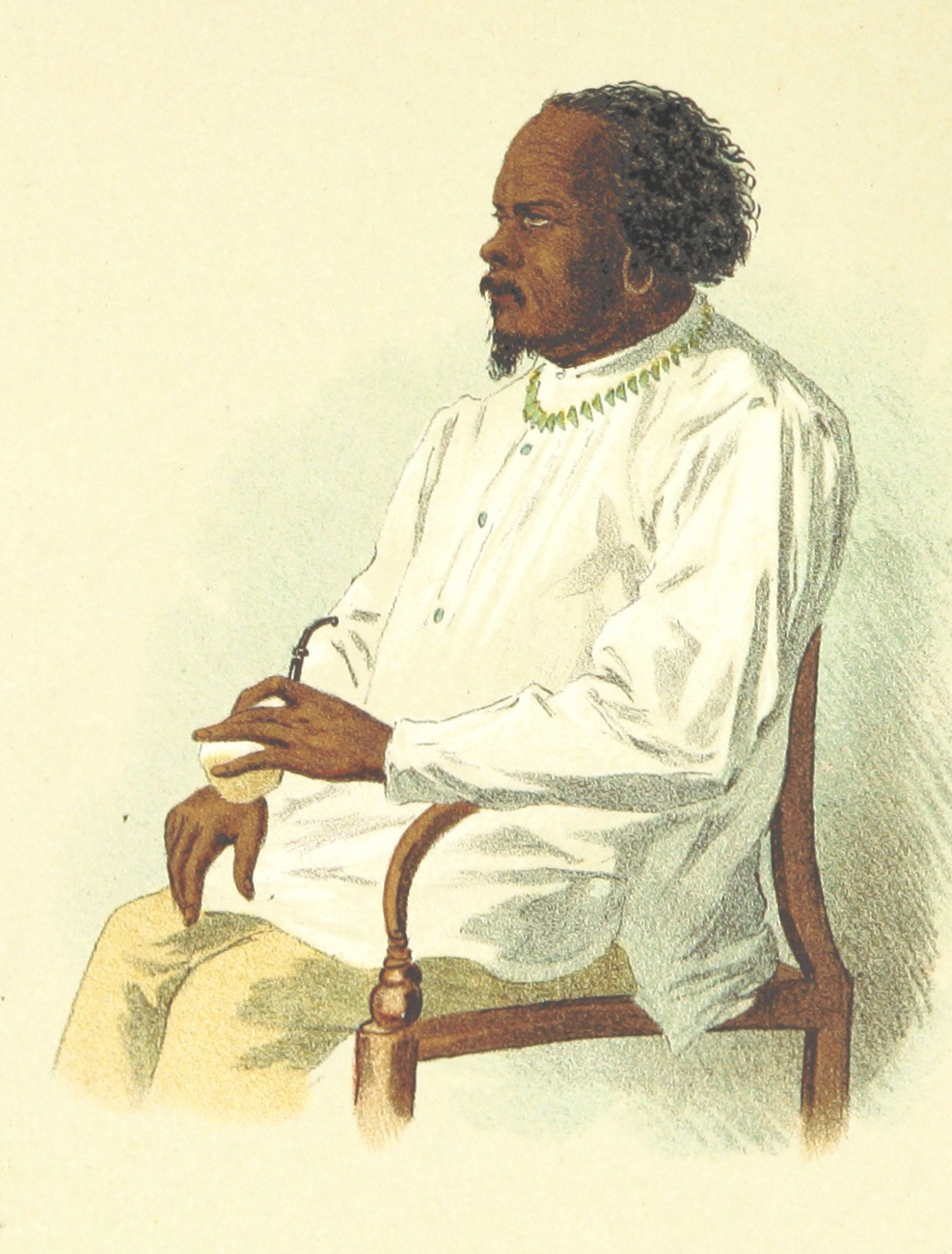
Kabua, c. 1880

Kabua the Great, also Kabua Laplap, (c. 1820 – July 4, 1910) was a Marshallese iroij whom the German Empire recognized as the king of the Marshall Islands. From 1863 until his death in 1910, he claimed to be the paramount chief, or iroijlaplap, of the Ralik Chain, though his cousin Loiak also claimed the title. Kabua worked with western missionaries and copra traders to expand his wealth and political power. He was also one of the several Marshallese iroij to sign treaties with the German Empire, first granting Germans exclusive trading rights in the Marshalls in 1878 and then legitimizing German annexation of the islands as a protectorate in 1885. The German treaties recognized Kabua as King of the Marshall Islands, though the German anthropologist Augustin Krämer noted that "Kabua is king only by the grace of the Germans."

== Biography ==
Kabua's home island was the Ailinglaplap Atoll. He was a famous warrior in his youth, and may have led the attack on the ship Sea Nymph at Jaluit Atoll in 1852. Only one crew member survived, and Kabua may have personally killed the ship's captain.

He was the younger of two nephews of iroijlaplap Kaibuke of Ebon Atoll, who died during a typhoid fever outbreak in 1863. Kabua's cousin, Ebon iroij Loiak traditionally would have acceded to the paramount chieftainship, but Kabua married Kaibuke's widow, making him the step-uncle and guardian of his elder cousin. Both chiefs sought support from foreigners by befriending missionaries and working with German copra traders in order to maintain influence.

The dispute remained peaceful for twelve years, but in September 1876, the conflict nearly erupted into violence. While both chiefs were staying on Ebon, copra trader James Lyle Young reported witnessing a mob of Loiak's followers wielding muskets and preparing to attack Kabua's followers across the lagoon. Kabua fled to his land on Jaluit rather than engaging in battle. In the following months, rumors circulated that Kabua would return and start a war. Loiak staged frequent military drills on Ebon and stockpiled weapons in late 1876, but Kabua's invasion never occurred.

On November 26, 1878, the German warship SMS Ariadne anchored at Jaluit to begin treaty negotiations with the iroij of the Ralik Chain. Kabua's followers performed a traditional Marshallese martial dance during a feast to welcome the Germans. During the second day of negotiations, Captain Bartholomäus von Werner ordered his men to give a military demonstration featuring a bayonet charge, a rapid firing demonstration, and use of artillery blanks, which he later said was intended to "show the islanders, who have not seen anything like it before, the power of the Europeans." German accounts recall that the islanders were terrified and that Kabua refused to dine with the German captain for the remainder of negotiations. On November 29, Werner signed a treaty with Kabua and several other Ralik Chain iroij which granted the German Empire "most favored nation" status in the Ralik Chain and required iroij to guarantee the rights of German citizens. Germany secured a fuelling station at Jaluit and free use of the atoll's harbor for German vessels. The German authorities also recognized Kabua as the "King of the Ralik Islands," though the treaty required that disputes between Marshallese and Germans would be arbitrated by German ship captains.

In May 1880, Loiak's followers invaded Jaluit to challenge Kabua, possibly because of the German recognition of Kabua as king. The two armies met and carried firearms but did not fight, and there were no casualties. Loiak's followers returned to Ebon several days later; Kabua fled to his home at Ailinglaplap, though he later returned to Jaluit.

In 1885, the German Empire maneuvered to annex the Marshall Islands as a protectorate. On October 13, 1885, the German corvette SMS Nautilus docked at Jaluit to obtain signatures on a treaty of protection. On October 15, Kabua, Loiak, and three other iroij signed a treaty in German and Marshallese. While the Marshallese text made no distinction of rank between the five chiefs, the German text recognized Kabua as the King of the Marshall Islands, despite the ongoing dispute between Kabua and Loiak.

Loiak died in 1904, and his brother-in-law Litokwa claimed his lands. Kabua claimed that he was entitled to Loiak's lands as iroijlaplap. A German tribunal took up the dispute in 1907. During the three-week trial, the German authorities feared that violence would break out between supporters of the two chiefs and brought policemen from German New Guinea to maintain order. In June 1907, the tribunal decided in Kabua's favor but rescinded the decision in October after finding that Kabua had coerced witnesses into making false statements. Kabua threatened to go to war with Litokwa over the reversal, but backed down when the German authorities threatened him with exile to New Guinea and dispatched nightly military patrols on Jaluit. In January 1910, the authorities issued a new decision that compromised between Kabua and Litokwa. Kabua retained most of the land, but Litokwa kept the lands he had worked during Loiak's lifetime. Loiak's children also received land parcels.

Kabua died on July 4, 1910, at the approximate age of 90. He was buried at Ailinglaplap.

== Family ==
Kabua had two sons: Laelan and Jeimata. He also had one daughter: Libetok/Litakbad. Through Jeimata, Kabua is the ancestor of three presidents of the Marshall Islands; he is the adoptive great-grandfather of Amata Kabua, first president; adoptive great-grandfather of Imata Kabua, second president; and great-great-grandfather of David Kabua, ninth president.
