= Albert Loeak =

Member of the Legislature

Member of the House of Iroij

Personal details
- Died: 1976 (aged 62); Honolulu, United States

Albert Loeak (died 1976) was a Marshallese chief who served as Iroij of Ailinglaplap.

== Biography ==
After becoming an Iroij, Loeak was a member of the House of Iroij, the upper house of the Marshallese district legislature. When it became a unicameral body, he was elected to the legislature.

He died in hospital in Honolulu in 1976 at the age of 62. His son Anjua Loeak succeeded him as Iroij of Ailinglaplap.
