= Anjua Loeak =

Anjua Loeak (died September 2016) was one of the Iroijlaplap (or paramount chief) of Ailinglaplap, and one of four paramount chiefs in the Ralik Chain. Loeak shared his domain with the Iroijlaplap of Kwajalein, formerly Imata Kabua.

== Court case ==
After a controversial court case utilizing the westernized American court system, Loeak rose to legitimacy after defeating his relative Melon Loeak who stood in line according to the natural line of patrilineal succession and existing records. In the most controversial sense of this case, Iroijlaplap Kabua Kabua testified on Anjua's behalf stating that Marshallese customs only allowed blue blooded royals being the blood son of the male chief to inherit the Iroijlaplap title despite there being an existing precedent with the Loeak's exercising such authority despite not being direct patrilineal descendants. The court case transcripts, particularly the summary judgment of this case, reveal that it was Kabua Kabua's testimony that won the case on behalf of Iroijlaplap Anjua Loeak who was the son ofiroojlaplap Albert Loeak. In the most surprising defeat, Melon Loeak, who was deemed the rightful heir by Iroijlaplap Lejolan Kabua, lost his legitimacy due to the prevailing reasoning of the American Trust Territory court system built on the most convincing arguments that neglected mentioning of sensitive issues prevalent in Marshallese customs.

The court transcript revealed that blood was the main criteria despite there being existing evidence from the landowners (Alaps) of Kabinmeto where Albert Loeak grew up revealing that this was literally the pot calling the kettle black as Albert Loeak himself was not the biological son of Iroijlaplap Lobokij Loeak. This showcased a clear degree of racism even in Marshallese society as the reigns of money have taken over the conscience of the Marshallese people particularly in Kwajlein and in Majuro despite the Marshallese Constitution under the Equal Protection Clause, specifically Section 12.2 stating otherwise. This is especially true considering the Compact of Free Association between the United States and Marshall Islands as its preamble was built on the foundation of Human Rights.

Loeak was a staunch supporter of community-based organizations, such as the Women United Together of the Marshall Islands.

== Ebeye Island lease ==
In May 2011, Loeak and Imata Kabua signed, along with president and fellow chief Jurelang Zedkaia, an agreement amending the terms to the United States' lease on the Reagan Test Site on Ebeye. The agreement, termed the Kwajalein Land Use Agreement, extended the lease until 2066 and raised the annual cost by US$3.7 million to US$15 million. The annual payments are divided among some 90 landowners; being one of the largest landowners in the country, Loeak received 11.3% of this.

== Death ==
Loeak died in early September 2016 and was later buried at Ailinglaplap Atoll.
