= Emlain Kabua =

1st First Lady of the Marshall Islands (1979–1996)

1st First Lady of Marshall Islands
- In office November 17, 1979 – December 19, 1996
- President: Amata Kabua
- Preceded by: Office created
- Succeeded by: Christina Lemari (Acting); Hiromi Kabua (1997)

Personal details
- Born: Emlain Kudo Kabua; 28 February 1928 South Seas Mandate
- Died: 11 April 2023 (aged 95)
- Party: Independent
- Spouse: Amata Kabua
- Children: 7, including David
- Occupation: Artist, First Lady

Emlain Kudo Kabua (28 February 1928 – 11 April 2023) was a Marshallese socialite and artist who served as First Lady of the Marshall Islands. She was the wife of Marshallese President Amata Kabua, and the mother of President David Kabua. Kabua served as the first First Lady of the Marshall Islands from 1979 until 1996. Kabua died on 11 April 2023.

The flag of the Marshall Islands, designed by Kabua

Kabua was the designer of the Flag of the Marshall Islands.

Kabua died on 11 April 2023, at the age of 95.
