= Amatlain Elizabeth Kabua =

Marshallese diplomat

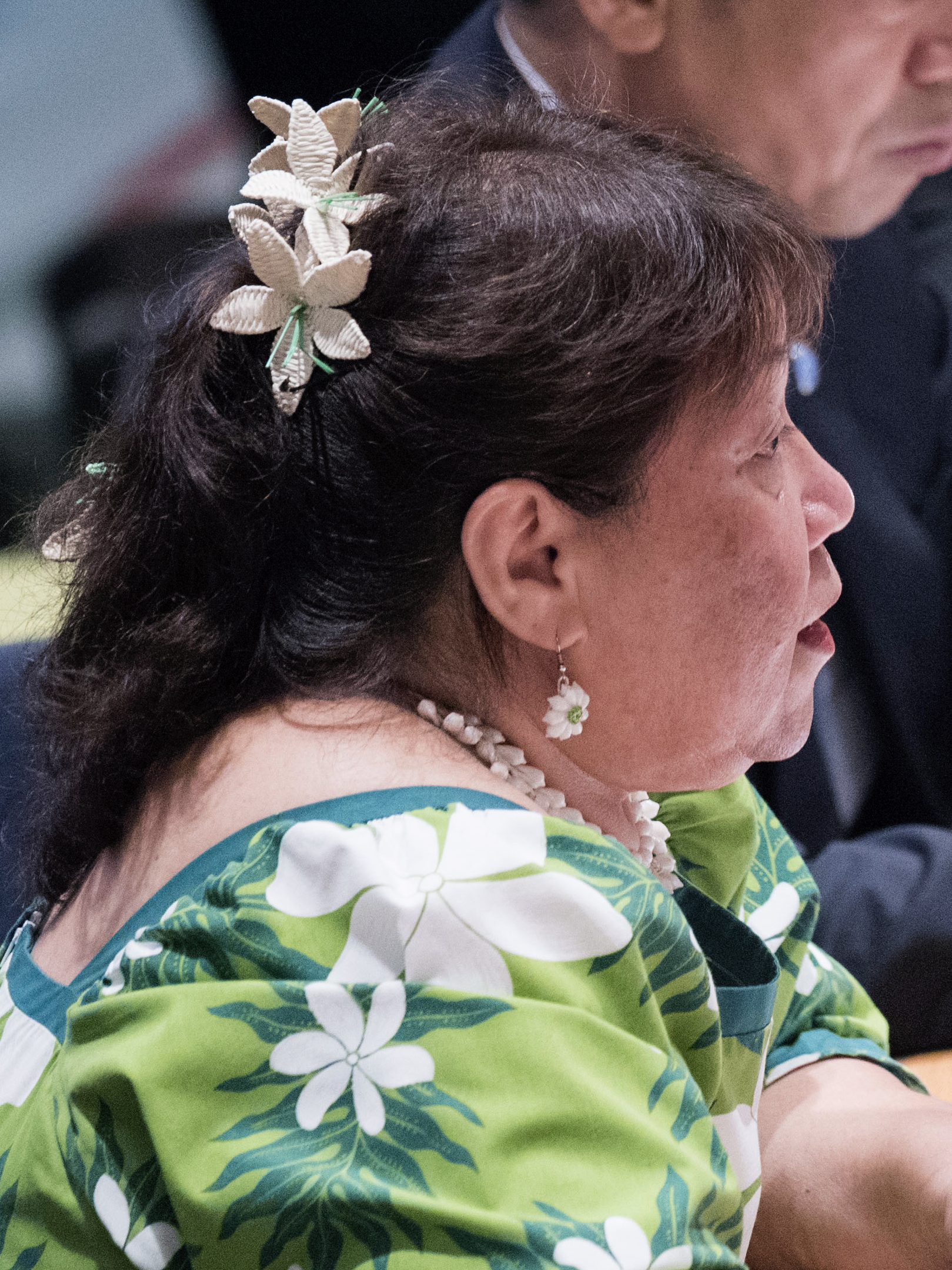
Amatlain Elizabeth Kabua

Amatlain Elizabeth Kabua (August 15, 1953 Majuro, Marshall Islands) is an Ambassador, teacher and politician. She is the Permanent Representative of the Marshall Islands to the United Nations.

Immediately prior to her post at the UN, she was Ambassador to Fiji since 2009, Ambassador to Japan between 1997 and 2003, Mayor of the Majuro Atoll Local Government between 1986 and 1997 and a teacher at the Garapan Elementary School in Saipan (1978–1980).

== Education ==
She attended Chaminade University of Honolulu; at Saint Francis High School, also in Honolulu; and at Mount Caramel High School in Saipan, Commonwealth of the Northern Mariana Islands.

== Honours ==
- Order of the Rising Sun, 2nd Class, Gold and Silver Star (2024)
