= Ann-Marie Hepler =

Marshallese swimmer

Personal information
- Born: April 8, 1996 (age 30) Majuro, Marshall Islands

Sport
- Sport: Swimming

Ann-Marie Hepler (born 8 April 1996) is a Marshallese swimmer. She competed at the 2012 Summer Olympics in the 50 m freestyle event where she ranked 49th. Hepler did not advance beyond the heats.

Coached by her mother, Amy LaCost, Hepler has been swimming since the age of 2, and has been a certified scuba diver since the age of 10. She worked as a lifeguard, swim instructor and assistant sports coach on Kwajalein. She graduated from the University of Nebraska–Lincoln in 2018 with a Bachelor of Arts majoring in psychology.

In 2019, she represented Marshall Islands at the 2019 World Aquatics Championships held in Gwangju, South Korea. She competed in the women's 50 metre freestyle event. She did not advance to compete in the semi-finals. She also competed in the women's 50 metre butterfly event.
