= Ebon Atoll =

Coral atoll in the Pacific Ocean

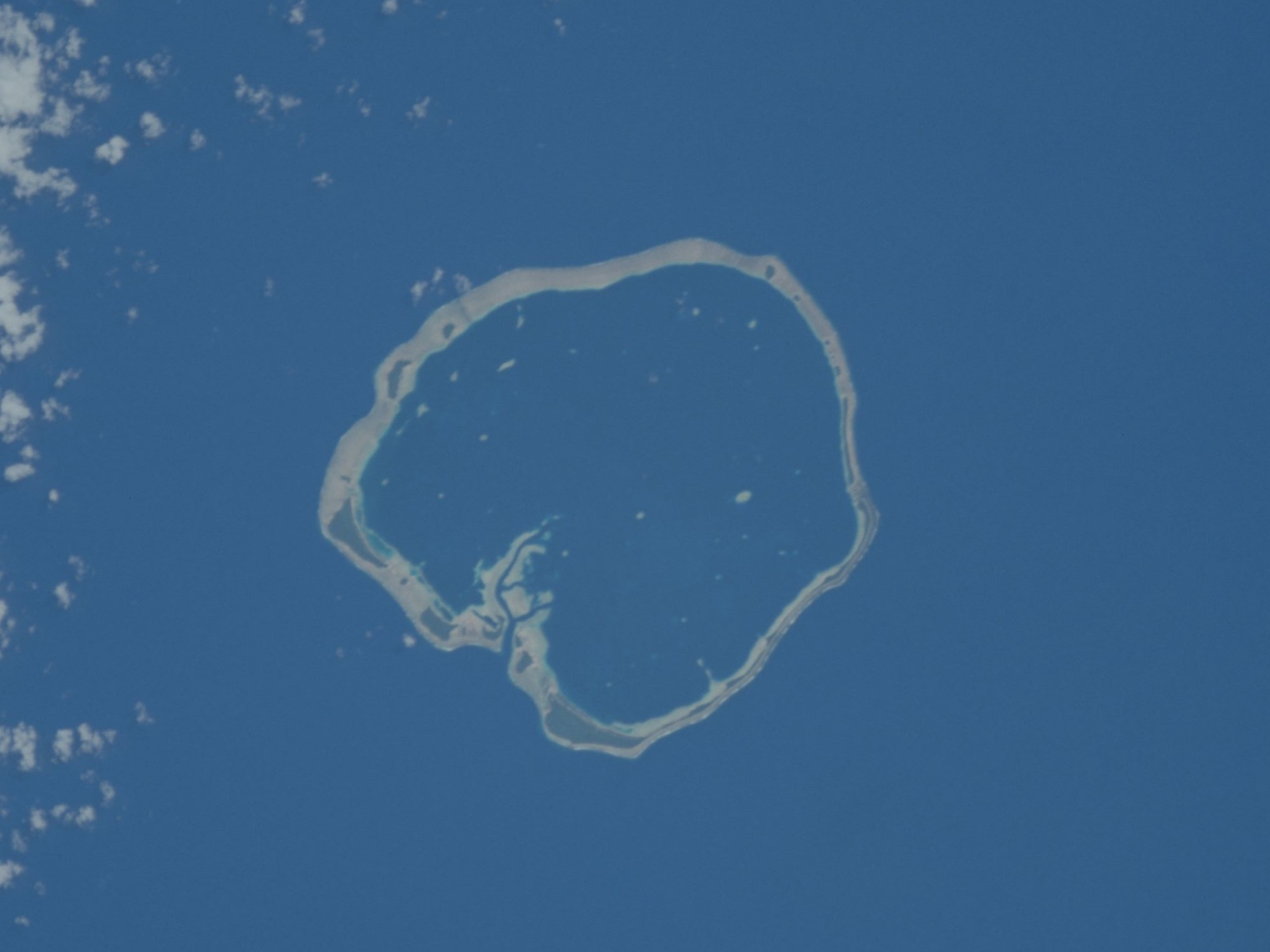
- NASA picture of Ebon Atoll

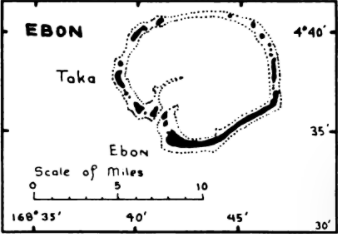
- Map and location of the atoll

- Location within Marshall Islands

Geography
- Location: Eastern Micronesia, North Pacific
- Coordinates: 04°38′00″N 168°43′00″E
- Archipelago: Ralik
- Total islands: 22
- Area: 5.75 km^{2} (2.22 sq mi)
- Highest elevation: 3 m (10 ft)

Administration
- Marshall Islands

Demographics
- Population: 469 (2021)
- Ethnic groups: Marshallese

Ebon Atoll (Marshallese: Epoon, [ɛbʲɔːnʲ]) is a coral atoll of 22 islands in the Pacific Ocean, forming a legislative district of the Ralik Chain of the Marshall Islands. Its land area is 5.75 square kilometers (2.22 sq mi), and it encloses a deep lagoon with an area of 104 square kilometers (40 sq mi). A winding passage, the Ebon Channel, leads to the lagoon from the southwest edge of the atoll. Ebon Atoll is approximately 155 kilometers (96 mi) south of Jaluit, and it is the southernmost land mass of the Marshall Islands, on the southern extremity of the Ralik Chain. In documents and accounts from the 1800s, it was also known as Boston, Covell's Group, Fourteen Islands, and Linnez.

== History ==
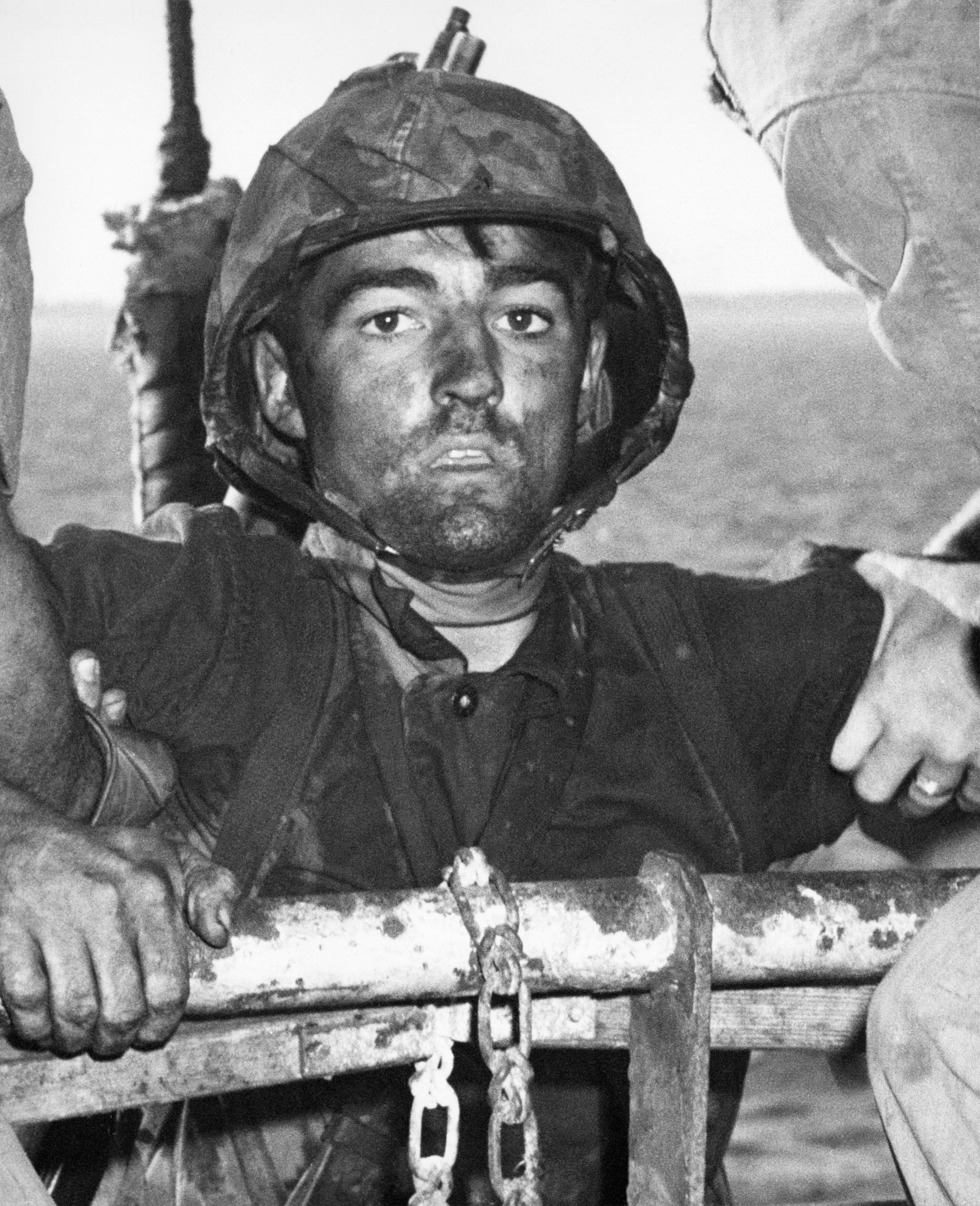
An exhausted U.S. Marine, Private Theodore J. Miller, exhibits the thousand-yard stare after two days of combat at the Battle of Eniwetok, February 1944. Miller would later be killed in action on Ebon Atoll a month later during Operation Flintlock.

Ebon Atoll was visited by commercial whaling vessels in the 19th century. The first such vessel on record was the Newark in 1837. The last whaler known to have visited was the Andrew Hicks in 1905.

The schooner Glencoe was taken and its crew massacred by Marshallese at Ebon in 1851 – one of three vessels attacked in the Marshall Islands in 1851 and 1852. There were several motives, and by some accounts, the ship's crew had been abducting island women for sale to plantation owners (slavery) at other destinations.

Missionaries sent by the American Board of Commissioners for Foreign Missions in Boston began missionary activities in the Marshall Islands in 1857, establishing a mission at Ebon.

Ebon was claimed by the German Empire along with the rest of the Marshall Islands in 1885. After World War I, the island came under the South Seas Mandate of the Empire of Japan, which had a garrison there late in World War II. The base became part of the vast US Naval Base Marshall Islands. At the end of WW II, Ebon Atoll became a part of the Trust Territory of the Pacific Islands under the control of the United States, until the independence of the Marshall Islands in 1986.

On January 30, 2014, castaway José Salvador Alvarenga, a Salvadoran national who had been working in Mexico as a fisherman, was found by locals from Ebon after he had pulled his boat ashore on Enienaitok [Tile] Islet at the conclusion of a 14-month drifting voyage of 10,800 kilometers (6,700 miles) across the Pacific.

== Demography ==
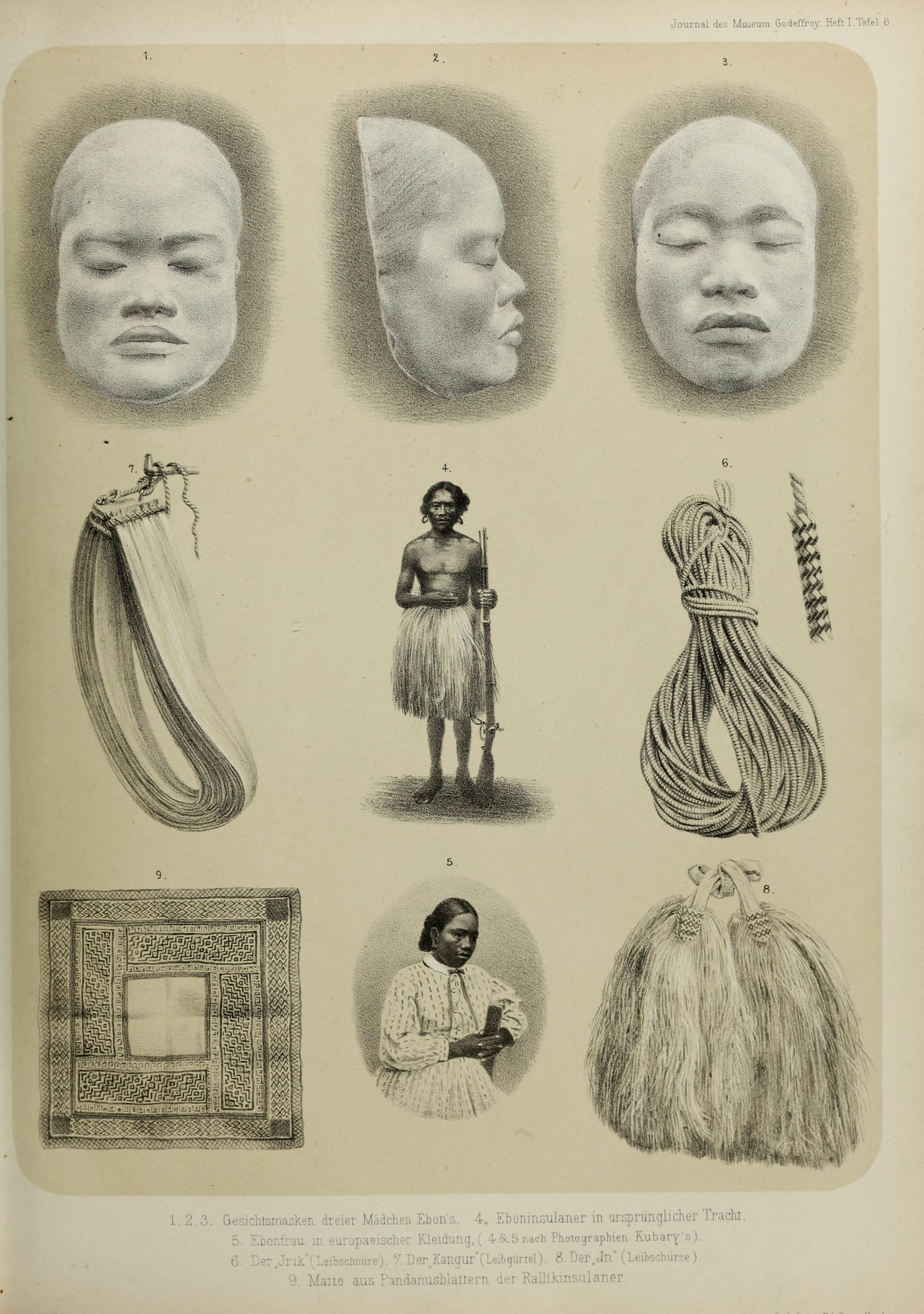
Journal des Museum Godeffroy entry on Ebon atoll, dating to the late 19th century cultural studies of Ebon.

In the period between 1920 and 1999, different governmental officials have conducted eleven census reports from Ebon, with an average total population of 735 people. The lowest count was under the Japanese colonial power in 1925, with 552 people, and the highest in 1999 — 20 years after independence — with 902 people. At the 2021 census, the atoll had a population of 469 people. The same report also notes that Ebon is among the atolls and islands of the Marshalls with a positive net migration rate — even though the population has decreased by 196 since the 1999 census. It is also curious to note that various German sources claim a significantly higher population — ranging from 1,000 to 2,000 people — in a 46-year period, 1860–1906. Moreover, in an unpublished interview series with Leonard Mason in 1949–1950, Dwight Heine (an Ebon local) tells of a legendary typhoon that swept Ebon sometime in the 1850s, the aftermath of which left the atoll population decimated. (Note: Heine says, “During the typhoon and the civil strife ... following the disaster, only one family survived.” The story says that a giant named “Labun̄bun̄” was responsible for most of the destruction following the typhoon, and he left Ebon for Kosrae, where he married and had a son he named Telensa. Telensa, also a big man, returned to Ebon with firearms and smokes. In the meantime, an irooj (chief) from Jaluit named Laukuk had moved to Ebon together with several families from Jaluit and Ailinglaplap. Since then, descendants of those people have owned and supervised the land.) Before the typhoon hit, Heine says, the Ebon population numbered several thousand.

Four of the islets on the atoll are permanently inhabited. The main island, Ebon [Epoon], houses a medical facility and the council house, and has the largest population. Tōkā has fewer residents but is more densely populated than Ebon. The other two islets are Enekoion [Āne-ko-ion] and Enilok [Āni-look]. Of the four, Āni-look is the only one without an elementary school, so children usually move in with family members on Tōkā during the school year. Many people have land rights on other islets and live there sporadically to work with copra production. The islets with the largest production rate are Āne-armej, Kumkumļap, and Enienaitok [Āni-eņ-aetok]. (Note: Enienaitok is the islet where José Salvador Alvarenga, the Salvadorian castaway, ended his 14 month-long drift from Mexico on 30 January 2014.)

== Education ==
Marshall Islands Public School System operates public schools:

- Ebon Elementary School
- Enekoion Elementary School
- Toka Elementary School

Students are zoned to Jaluit High School in Jaluit Atoll.

== Transportation ==
Ebon Airport serves the atoll by air, with smaller ships sometimes visiting too.
