= Jaluit Atoll =

Atoll in the Marshall Islands

Jaluit
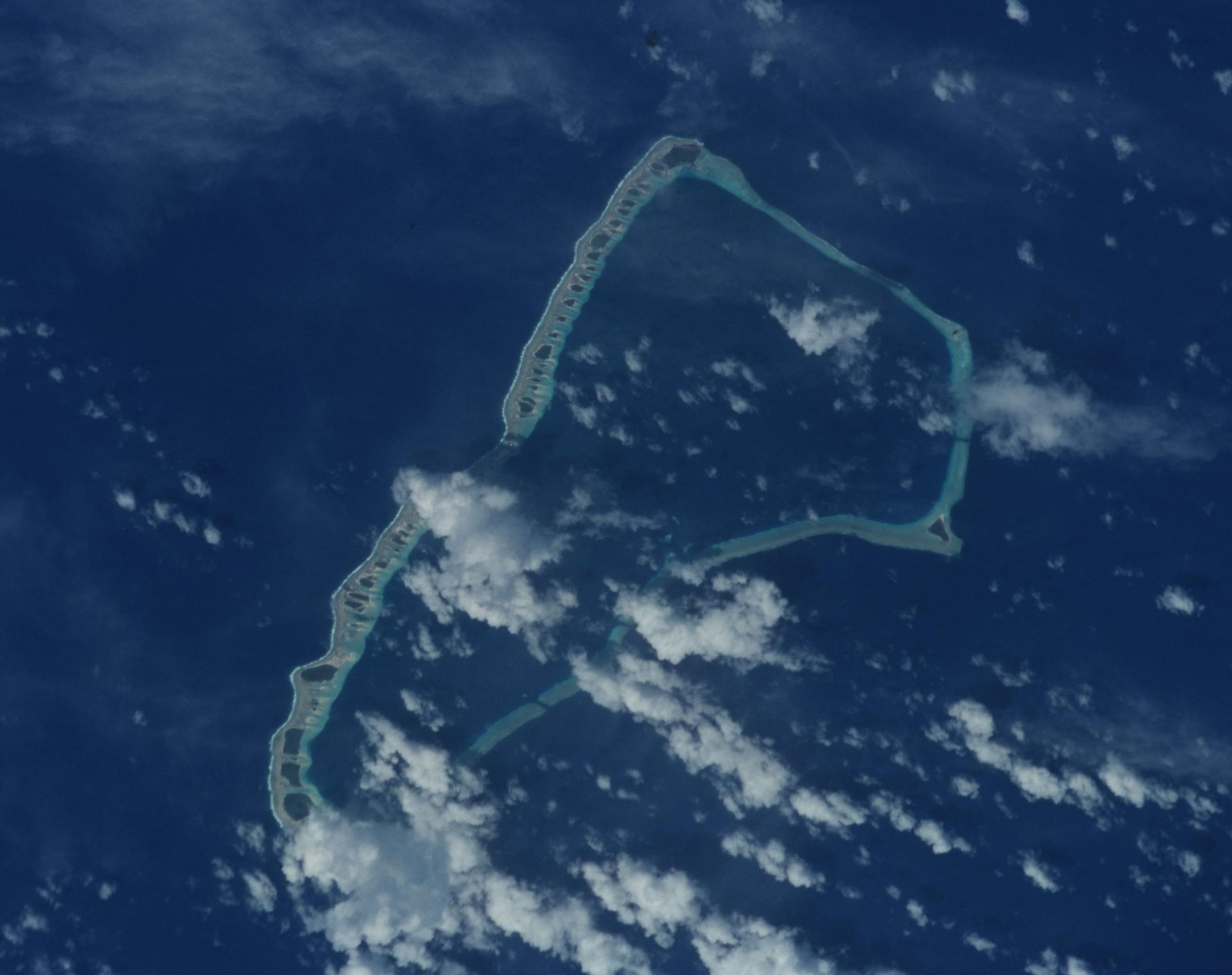
- NASA image of Jaluit Atoll

- Location within Marshall Islands

Geography
- Location: North Pacific
- Coordinates: 05°55′18″N 169°38′33″E
- Archipelago: Ralik
- Total islands: 91
- Area: 11.34 km^{2} (4.38 sq mi)
- Highest elevation: 3 m (10 ft)

Administration
- Marshall Islands

Demographics
- Population: 1,409 (2021)
- Ethnic groups: Marshallese

Ramsar Wetland
- Official name: Jaluit Atoll Conservation Area
- Designated: 13 July 2004
- Reference no.: 1389

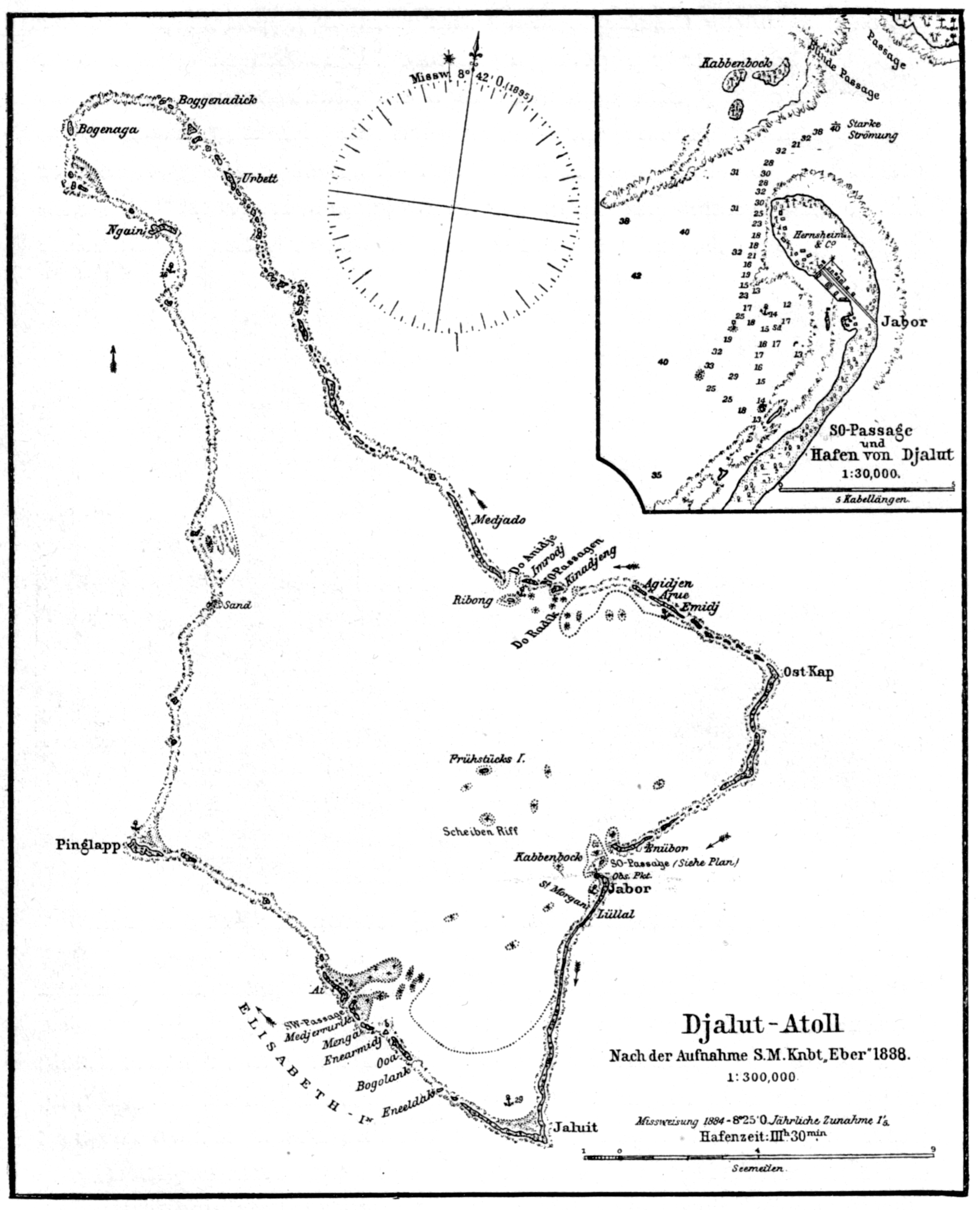
1896 map of Jaluit Atoll

Jaluit Atoll (Marshallese: Jālwōj, [tʲælʲ(o)wɤtʲ], or Jālooj, [tʲælʲoːtʲ]) is a large coral atoll of 91 islands in the Pacific Ocean and forms a legislative district of the Ralik Chain of the Republic of the Marshall Islands. Its total land area is 11.34 square kilometers (4.38 sq mi), and it encloses a lagoon with an area of 690 square kilometers (270 sq mi). Most of the land area is on the largest islet (motu) of Jaluit (10.4 km^{2}). Jaluit is approximately 220 kilometers (140 mi) southwest of Majuro. Jaluit Atoll is a designated conservation area and Ramsar Wetland.

In 2021 the population of the islands of Jaluit Atoll was 1,409. It was the former administrative seat of the Marshall Islands.

== History ==
The British merchant vessel Rolla sighted Jaluit in 1803. She had transported convicts from Britain to New South Wales and was on her way to China to find a cargo to take back to Britain.

In 1885, the German Empire annexed Jaluit Atoll and the other Marshall Islands as protectorate. From 1888 to 1906 the islands were administered by the Jaluit Company on behalf of Germany’s colonial government. German imperial commissars (Kaiserliche Kommissare) included:

- 1886–1888 Dr. jur. Wilhelm Knappe (1855–1910)
- 1888–1888 Dr. Franz Leopold Sonnenschein (1857–1897)
- 1889–1891 Friedrich Louis Max Biermann
- 1891–1894 Dr. Karl Wilhelm Schmidt (b. 4 March 1859 in Braunschweig)
- 11 May 1894 – March 1898 Georg Irmer (b. 1853 – d. 1931)
- 24 March 1898 – 18 January 1906 Eugen Brandeis (b. 1846 – d. 1919) (acting to 22 February 1900)
- 18 January 1906 – May 1906 Ludwig Kaiser (acting) (b. 1862 – d. 1906)
- 1 April 1906 – 3 October 1914 the governors of German New Guinea; afterwards the jurisdiction was downgraded to district, under a Bezirksamtmann

After World War I, the island became a part of the South Seas Mandate, a mandated territory of the Empire of Japan, and was the seat of the Japanese administration over the Marshall Islands. Immigrants from Japan numbered several hundred by the 1930s. During World War II the island's Japanese garrison consisted of 1,584 men of the Imperial Japanese Navy and 727 men of the Imperial Japanese Army. The island was bombed on at least five occasions in November and December 1943 by B-24 Liberator bombers of the USAAF 7th Air Force. The island became part of the vast US Naval Base Marshall Islands.

From World War II until 1986, Jaluit came under the control of the United States as part of the Trust Territory of the Pacific Islands.

After World War II, the United States was engaged in a Cold War nuclear arms race with the Soviet Union. The population of Bikini Atoll had agreed in 1945 to temporarily relocate to allow the U.S. to test then-new nuclear weapons at Bikini, which they were told were of great importance to humankind.

The displaced islanders struggled for survival at several other Marshall Islands, including Rongerik Atoll, Ujelang Atoll, Kwajalein Atoll, and Kili Island. A decade later the U.S. suggested that some of the Bikini Islanders move to Jaluit. Three families moved there to produce copra for sale and other families rotated living there later on. Their homes on both Kili and Jaluit were struck by typhoons during 1957 and 1958, sinking their supply ship and damaging crops.

Jaluit remained under the control of the United States until the independence of the Marshall Islands in 1986.

== Geography ==
Jaluit Atoll's lagoon is shaped roughly like a kite.

The islet of Jabor (Jebwad, [tʲɛbˠ(ɔ)wɑrʲ]) has the largest population center on Jaluit Atoll, with a population of approximately 1,200. The island features a small hotel, small stores that sell staple foods, and a gasoline station. Jabor is a base for commercial and sports fishing, where motorboats can be rented. Snorkeling spots are around the sunken dock by the airport and in the northern pass into the lagoon.The island of Jabor is the center of product that many islanders drop by to buy food and materials to prepare their children for the next school semester.

Imiej (Im̧wej, [imwi̯etʲ]) is an islet a 45-minute boat ride from Jabor. It used to be the headquarters for the Imperial Japanese Navy garrison and was a major seaplane base. The ruins of the power station, barracks, antiaircraft guns and a Shinto shrine remain.

== Education ==
Marshall Islands Public School System operates public schools.

High schools:

- Jaluit High School (JHS) - a boarding school that serves students from Jaluit Atoll and the southern atolls of Ebon, Ailinglaplap, Namu, Kili, Namdrik and Jabat.

Primary schools:

- Imiej Elementary School
- Imroj Elementary School
- Jabnoden Elementary School
- Jabor Elementary School - Jabor
- Jaluit Elementary School
- Mejrirok Elementary School
- Narmej Elementary School

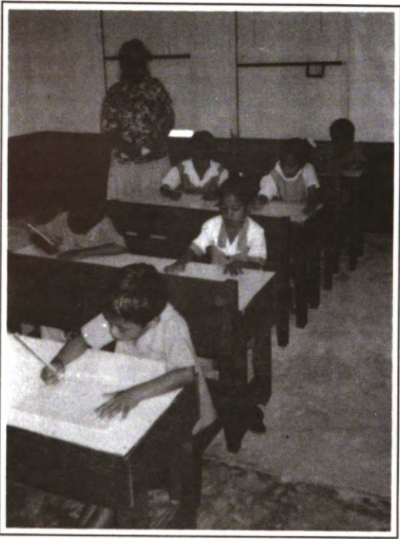
St. Joseph's School

Private schools: Jabor has St. Josephs, attached to the Catholic Church.

== Transportation ==
Jaluit Airport is served by Air Marshall Islands.

== Twin Town ==
Jaluit is twinned with:

- New Taipei City, Taiwan, since 2019
