= Council of Iroij =

History
- Founded: 1979
- Seats: 12

The Council of Iroij, also known as the House of Iroij, is a consultative body in the Marshall Islands provided for by the constitution. Its twelve members consist of the Iroij, the traditional chiefs of the islands. The Council of Iroij has the power to review any proposed legislation affecting land rights or traditional practices.

== History ==
A House of Iroij was established in 1949 when a bicameral Congress was established consisting of the House of Iroij and the House of Assembly. However, the House of Iroij was abolished in 1958 when new constitution created a unicameral Legislature. The Council of Iroij was subsequently established by the 1979 constitution.

== Membership ==
The membership of the Council of Iroij is defined by the constitution, with five members from the Ralik Chain (of which one is from Ujelang and the other four from the remaining islands) and seven from the Ratak Chain (one each from Airok, Arno, Likiep, Majuro, Mejit, Mili and one representing Ailuk, Aur, Maloelap (excluding Airok), Utrik and Wotje).

Members can lose their seats if they are elected to the legislature, cease to be a qualified voter or resign. In cases where there is more than one eligible Iroijlaplap for a defined area, the eligible members rotate membership, serving one year-terms.

== See also ==
- Members of the House of Iroij
