= Colleen Furgeson =

Marshallese swimmer (born 1998)

Personal information
- Nationality: Marshallese
- Born: 21 November 1998 (age 27)
- Height: 1.76 m (5 ft 9 in)
- Weight: 65 kg (143 lb)

Sport
- Sport: Swimming

Colleen Furgeson (born 21 November 1998) is a Marshallese swimmer. She is a two-time Olympian, representing the Marshall Islands at the 2016 Summer Olympics and the delayed 2020 Summer Olympics. She also represented the Marshall Islands at the FINA World Swimming Championships and holds multiple national records.

== Early life ==
Furgeson was born on 21 November 1998 on Kwajalein Island, Marshall Islands.

== Career ==
Furgeson contested her first FINA event aged 14. She travelled to Barcelona, Catalonia, Spain for the 2013 World Aquatics Championships. She contested both the women's 50 metre freestyle and the women's 50 metre backstroke finishing 63rd and 49th respectively.

Two years later, Furgeson competed at the 2015 World Aquatics Championships in Kazan, Russia. She contested both the women's 100 metre freestyle and the women's 50 metre backstroke finishing 83rd and 45th respectively.

In 2016, Furgeson represented the Marshall Islands at the 2016 Summer Olympics in Rio de Janeiro, Brazil. She contested the heats for the women's 50 metre freestyle, finishing in 28.16 seconds which was ultimately not fast enough to advance to the semi-finals and she was ranked 58th overall.

Furgeson again represented the Marshall Islands at the delayed 2020 Summer Olympics in Tokyo, Japan. She contested the heats for the women's 100 m freestyle, finishing in 58.71 seconds which was ultimately not fast enough to advance to the semi-finals and she was ranked 44th overall.

She has not competed since the 2021 FINA World Swimming Championships in Abu Dhabi, United Arab Emirates. She holds 13 Marshallese national records.
