= Flag of the Marshall Islands =

Marshall Islands
- Use: National flag
- Proportion: 10∶19
- Adopted: May 1, 1979; 47 years ago
- Design: A blue field with two diagonal stripes of orange and white radiating from the lower hoist-side corner to the upper fly-side corner and the large white star with four large rays and twenty small rays on the upper hoist-side corner above the stripes.
- Designed by: Emlain Kabua

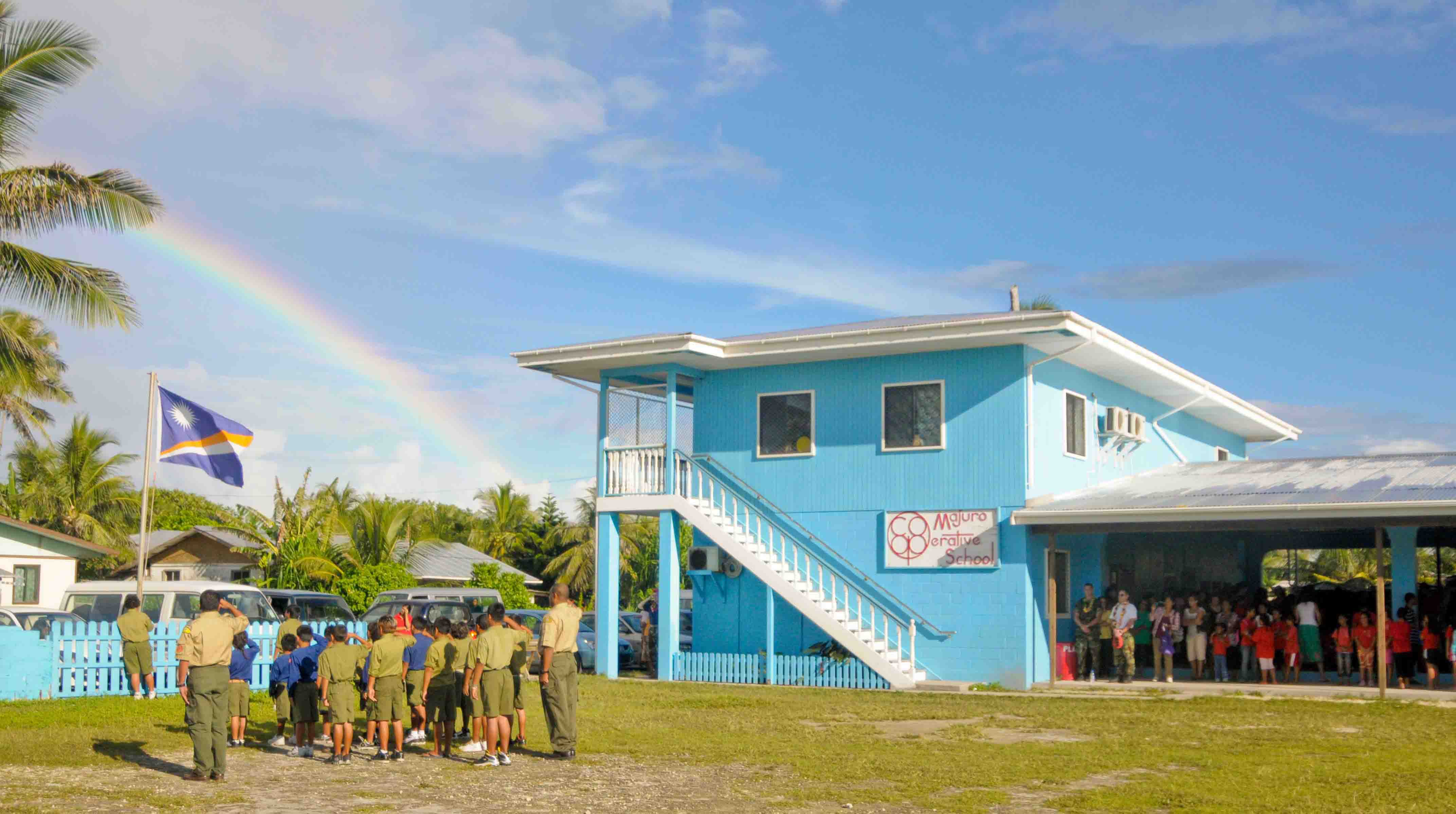
Marshall Islands flag at the Majuro Cooperative School.

The flag of the Republic of the Marshall Islands, an island nation in the Pacific, was adopted upon the start of self-government, May 1, 1979. The flag was designed by Emlain Kabua, who served as the first First Lady of the republic.

Rules and specifications regarding the flag are set forth in the Official Flag of the Marshall Islands Act 1979 (Public Law 1979–1).

== History ==
The Marshall Islands were part of the Trust Territory of the Pacific Islands administered by the United States, from which the Marshall Islands, Palau, and the Federated States of Micronesia split. In common with other island nations in the region, this flag features the symbolic representation of the islands' place within the ocean. The rising diagonal band represents the equator, the star above representing this Northern Hemisphere archipelago. The white and orange portions of the band represent, respectively, the Ratak Chain ("sunrise") and the Ralik Chain ("sunset"), as well as symbolizing peace and courage. The star's 24 points represent the number of electoral districts, while the four elongated points represent the principal cultural centers of Majuro, Jaluit, Wotje and Ebeye. The flag is also the national flag with the most points on a star, at 24.

This flag placed ninth out of 72 - the best flag of an independent nation that isn't Canada or the United States, instead being in a free association with the United States - in a North American Vexillological Association poll that was held in 2001.

Flag used during Spanish colonial rule in 1529

Flag used during British colonial rule in 1788

Flag used during Spanish colonial rule from 1874 to 1885

Flag used during German colonial rule from 1878 to 1894

Flag of The Jaluit Company from 1885 to 1906

Flag of The German New Guinea from 1906 to 1914

Colonial Flag of New Guinea from 1906 to 1914

Flag used during Japanese colonial rule from 1914 to 1944

Flag of Governor of the South Seas Mandate from 1919 to 1944

Flag of the Trust Territory of the Pacific Islands; was used in the RMI from 1965 to 1979

The flag of the United Nations was also used in the RMI from 1947 to 1965

The flag of the United States with 48 stars was also used in the RMI from 1944 to 1959 (see Timeline of the flag of the United States for more information on the stars on this flag increasing in number)

The flag of the United States with 49 stars was also used in the RMI from 1959 to 1960

The flag of the United States with 50 stars was also used in the RMI from 1960 to 1986

Current flag, from 1979 to the present

== Subnational flags ==
Flag of Ailuk Atoll

Flag of Bikini Atoll from 1987 to the present

Flag of Ebon Atoll

Flag of Kwajalein Atoll

Flag of Majuro Atoll

Flag of Namdrik Atoll

Flag of Ujae Atoll

Flag of Wotho Atoll

== Specifications ==
Construction sheet

The flag has a ratio of 10:19. The star is situated such that its center is equidistant from the left edge, the top edge, and the top of the orange ray.

=== Colors ===
| Scheme | Dark Powder Blue | Fulvous | White |
|---|---|---|---|
| RGB | 0-56-147 | 221-117-0 | 255-255-255 |
| CMYK | C1-M0-Y0-K42.3 | C0-M47-Y100-K13.3 | C0-M0-Y0-K0 |
| HEX | #003893 | #DD7500 | #FFFFFF |
