= Phillip Kinono =

Marshallese swimmer (born 1997)

Personal information
- Born: 10 December 1997 (age 28) Majuro, Marshall Islands
- Height: 172 cm (5 ft 8 in)

Sport
- Sport: Swimming

Phillip Kinono (born 10 December 1997) is a Marshallese swimmer. He competed in the men's 50 metre freestyle event at the 2020 Summer Olympics.

== Competition record ==
Year	Competition	Venue	Position	Event	Notes
Representing the Marshall Islands
2017	World Aquatics Championships	Budapest, Hungary	118th	50 metre freestyle	30.75
2017	World Aquatics Championships	Budapest, Hungary	112th	100 metre freestyle	1:12.94
2018	FINA World Swimming Championships (25 m)	Hangzhou, China		50 metre breaststroke	DQ
2018	FINA World Swimming Championships (25 m)	Hangzhou, China		100 metre freestyle	DQ
2019	World Aquatics Championships	Gwangju, South Korea	124th	50 metre freestyle	29.25
2019	World Aquatics Championships	Gwangju, South Korea	74th	50 metre backstroke	41.27

== Best Results ==
Event	Time	Date	Venue	Notes
50 metre freestyle	27.86	30 July 2021	JPN	
50 metre backstroke	41.27	27 July 2019	KOR	
50 metre breaststroke	42.35	28 June 2018	PNG	
50 metre butterfly	39.75	26 June 2018	PNG	
100 metre freestyle	1:12.94	26 July 2017	HUN	
100 metre breaststroke	1:44.74	27 June 2018	PNG	
