= Marshall Islands at the 2011 World Aquatics Championships =

Sporting event delegation

Flag of Marshall Islands

Marshall Islands competed at the 2011 World Aquatics Championships in Shanghai, China between July 16 and 31, 2011.

== Swimming ==
Marshall Islands qualified 3 swimmers.

Men

Athlete	Event	Heats		Semifinals		Final	
Athlete	Event	Time	Rank	Time	Rank	Time	Rank
Giordan Harris	Men's 50m Freestyle	27.71	90	did not advance			
Giordan Harris	Men's 100m Freestyle	1:02.53	95	did not advance			
Daniel Langinbelik	Men's 50m Freestyle	31.73	109	did not advance			
Daniel Langinbelik	Men's 100m Freestyle	1:12.52	103	did not advance			

Women

Athlete	Event	Heats		Semifinals		Final	
Athlete	Event	Time	Rank	Time	Rank	Time	Rank
Ann-Marie Hepler	Women's 50m Freestyle	28.43	53	did not advance			
Ann-Marie Hepler	Women's 50m Butterfly	30.69	39	did not advance			
