= Marshall Islands =

Island country in the Pacific Ocean

Republic of the Marshall Islands Aolepān Aorōkin M̧ajeļ (Marshallese)
- Flag Seal
- Motto: Jepilpilin ke ejukaan (Marshallese) ("Accomplishment through joint effort")
- Anthem: "Forever Marshall Islands"
- Wake island, marked orange, is claimed by Marshall Islands but controlled by The United States of America.
- Status: Sovereign state and UN member state under a Compact of Free Association with the United States (associated state)
- Capital and largest city: Majuro; 7°7′N 171°4′E
- Official languages: Marshallese; English
- Ethnic groups (2021): 95.6% Marshallese; 4.4% others
- Religion (2026): 96.2% Christianity; 79.9% Protestantism; 9.3% Catholicism; 7.0% other Christian; 1.1% no religion; 2.7% others
- Demonym: Marshallese
- Government: Unitary parliamentary republic with an executive president
  - President: Hilda Heine
  - Speaker: Brenson S. Wase
  - Minister in Assistance to the President: Bremity Lakjohn
- Legislature: Nitijela

Independence from the United States
  - Self-government: May 1, 1979
  - Compact of Free Association: October 21, 1986

Area
  - Total: 181.43 km^{2} (70.05 sq mi) (189th)
  - Water (%): Negligible

Population
  - 2024 estimate: 37,548 (188th)
  - 2021 census: 42,418
  - Density: 233/km^{2} (603.5/sq mi) (47th)
- GDP (PPP): 2019 estimate
  - Total: $215 million
  - Per capita: $3,789
- GDP (nominal): 2024 estimate
  - Total: $290.1 million
  - Per capita: $7,726
- HDI (2023): ▲0.733 high (108th)
- Currency: United States dollar
- Time zone: UTC+12 (MHT)
  - Summer (DST): Not observed
- Date format: MM/DD/YYYY
- Calling code: +692
- ISO 3166 code: MH
- Internet TLD: .mh

The Marshall Islands, (Note: Marshallese: M̧ajeļ) officially the Republic of the Marshall Islands, (Note: Marshallese: Aolepān Aorōkin M̧ajeļ. Pronunciations: English: Republic of the Marshall Islands /ˈmɑːrʃəl ˈaɪləndz/ Marshallese: Aolepān Aorōkin Ṃajeḷ ([ɑɔlʲɛbʲænʲɑːorˠɤɡinʲ(i)mˠɑːzʲɛlˠ])) is an archipelagic country in Oceania. The sovereign state lies west of the International Date Line and north of the equator in the Micronesia region of the Northwestern Pacific Ocean.

The islands consist of 29 coral atolls, five main islands, and 1,220 other very small ones, divided across two island chains: Ratak in the east and Ralik in the west. Its capital and largest city is Majuro, home to approximately half of the country's population, and 98.47% of its territory is lagoon waters, (Note: The country officially has 0% inland water and 181km² land. Its enclosed lagoons occupy 11,673km² area, which is 98.47% of its total area. Its exclusive economic zone (EEZ) is 2.1 million km² of which 99.99% is water.) the largest proportion of water to land of any sovereign state. One of only four atoll-based nations along with Kiribati, The Maldives, and Tuvalu, the country shares maritime boundaries with Wake Island to the north, (Note: Wake Island is claimed as a territory of the Marshall Islands, but is also claimed as an unorganized, unincorporated territory of the United States, with de facto control vested in the Office of Insular Affairs (and all military defenses managed by the United States military).) Kiribati to the southeast, Nauru to the south, and the Federated States of Micronesia to the west. The Marshall Islands has one of the world’s highest rates of diabetes. In Ebeye, the country's second most populated island, over 33% of residents have the disease.

Austronesian settlers reached the Marshall Islands as early as the 2nd millennium BC and introduced Southeast Asian crops, including coconuts, giant swamp taro, and breadfruit, as well as domesticated chickens, which made the islands permanently habitable.

The first Europeans to visit the islands were the crew of a Spanish maritime expedition led by Alonso de Salazar who arrived in Taongi in 1526, which they called Isla de San Bartolomé (Saint Bartholomew Island). They were the survivors of a larger expedition which had sailed from Spain in 1525 led by Garcia Jofre de Loaisa. In 1528, another Spanish ship arrived in the Marshall Islands and visited Ujelang and Enewetak, this time led by Alvaro de Saavedra who was sailing back to the Americas from the Spice Islands. Later, Spanish galleons usually sailed a Pacific route farther north and avoided the Marshalls. European maps and charts named the group for British captain John Marshall, who explored the region in 1788. American Protestant missionaries and Western business interests began arriving in the 1850s. German copra traders dominated the economy in the 1870s and 1880s, and the German Empire annexed the Marshalls as a protectorate in 1885.

The Empire of Japan occupied the islands in the autumn of 1914 at the beginning of World War I. After the war, the Marshalls and other former German Pacific colonies north of the equator became the Japanese South Seas Mandate. The United States occupied the islands during World War II and administered them as part of the Trust Territory of the Pacific Islands after the war. Between 1946 and 1958, the United States conducted 67 nuclear tests at Bikini Atoll and Enewetak Atoll. (Note: There is a discrepancy related to the total number of tests conducted: 66 or 67. The total number is 67, but two tests (HARDTACK I SCAEVOLA and HARDTACK I QUINCE) were with zero yield: one was a safety test, the other did not work out. And sometimes one of them doesn't count. Another source of this discrepancy is the widely cited article by Simon and Robison, the summary of which lists the total number of tests conducted in the Marshall Islands as 66 (23 at Bikini Atoll + 42 at Enewetak Atoll + 1 between the atolls), although the attached table lists data for all 67 tests (23 + 43 + 1).)

The U.S. government formed the Congress of Micronesia in 1965, a plan for increased self-governance of Pacific islands. In May 1979, the United States gave the Marshall Islands independence by recognizing its constitution and president, Amata Kabua. Full sovereignty or self-government was achieved in a Compact of Free Association with the United States. The Marshall Islands has been a member of the Pacific Community (PC) since 1983 and a United Nations member state since 1991.

Politically, the Marshall Islands is a presidential parliamentary republic in free association with the United States, with the U.S. providing defense, subsidies, and access to U.S.-based agencies such as the Federal Communications Commission and the United States Postal Service. With few natural resources, the islands' wealth is based on a service economy, as well as fishing and agriculture; aid from the United States represents a large percentage of the islands' gross domestic product, and although most financial aid from the Compact of Free Association was set to expire in 2023, it was extended for another 20 years that same year. The country uses the United States dollar as its currency.

The majority of the citizens of the Republic of Marshall Islands are of Marshallese descent, though there are small numbers of immigrants from the United States, China, Philippines, and other Pacific islands. The two official languages are Marshallese, which is one of the Oceanic languages, and English. Almost the entire population of the islands practices some religion: three-quarters of the country follows either the United Church of Christ – Congregational in the Marshall Islands (UCCCMI) or the Assemblies of God.

== History ==
=== Prehistory ===
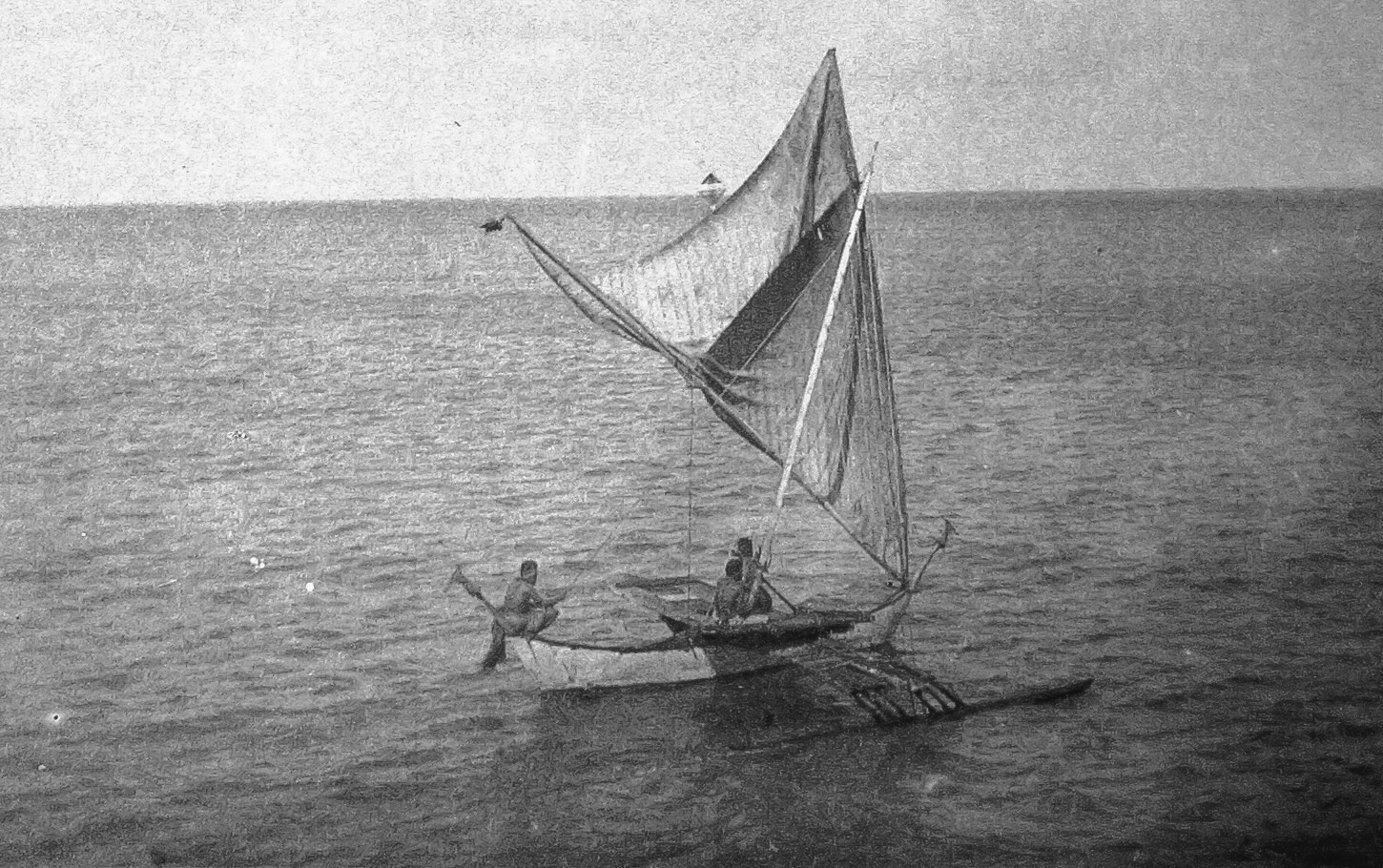
Marshall Islanders sailing, with sails brailed (reefed), c. 1899–1900

Linguistic and anthropological studies have suggested that the first Austronesian settlers of the Marshall Islands arrived from the Solomon Islands. Radiocarbon dating suggests that Bikini Atoll may have been inhabited as early as 1200 BCE, though samples may not have been collected from secure stratigraphic contexts and older driftwood samples may have affected results. Archaeological digs on other atolls have found evidence of human habitation dating around the 1st century CE at the village of Laura on Majuro and on Kwajalein Atoll.

The Austronesian settlers introduced Southeast Asian crops, including coconuts, giant swamp taro, and breadfruit, as well as domesticated chickens throughout the Marshall Islands. They possibly seeded the islands by leaving coconuts at seasonal fishing camps before permanently settling years later. The southern islands receive heavier rainfall than the north, so communities in the wet south subsisted on prevalent taro and breadfruit, while northerners were more likely to subsist on pandanus and coconuts. Southern atolls probably supported larger, more dense populations.

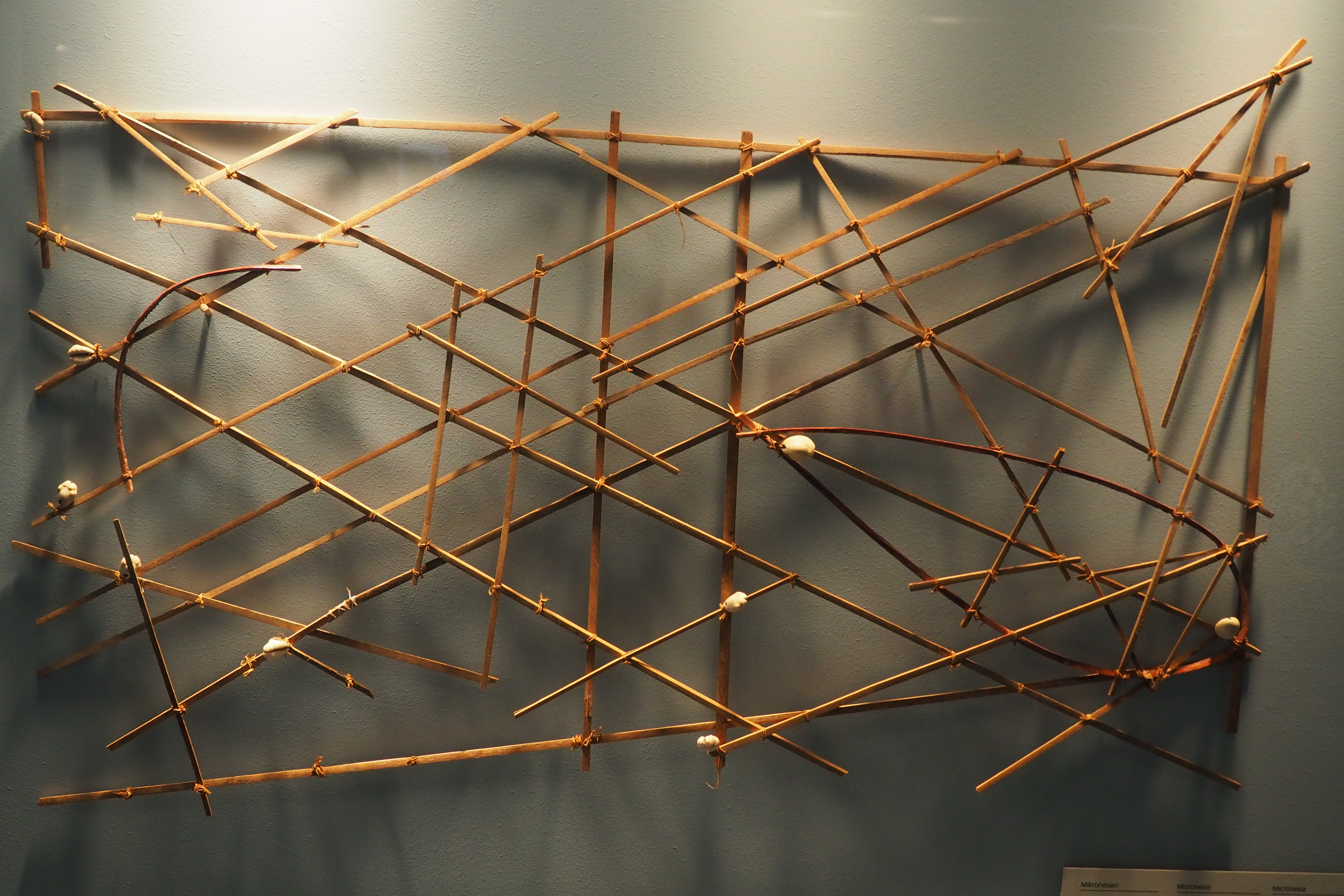
A Marshallese stick chart. Most were made from a grid of coconut frond midribs with small shells representing the relative location of islands.

The Marshallese sailed between islands on walaps made from breadfruit-tree wood and coconut-fiber rope. They navigated by using the stars for orientation and initial course setting, but also developed a piloting technique of interpreting disruptions in ocean swells to determine the location of low coral atolls below the horizon. They noticed that swells refracted around the undersea slope of atolls. When refracted swells from different directions met, they created noticeable disruption patterns, which Marshallese pilots could read to determine the direction of an island. When interviewed by anthropologists, some Marshallese sailors noted that they piloted their canoes by both sight and feeling changes in the motion of the boat. Sailors also invented stick charts to map the swell patterns, but unlike western navigational charts, the Marshallese stick charts were tools for teaching students and for consultation before embarking on a voyage; navigators did not take charts with them when they set sail.

When Russian explorer Otto von Kotzebue visited the Marshalls in 1817, the islanders still showed few signs of western influence. He observed that the Marshallese lived in thatched-roof huts, but their villages did not include the large ornate meeting houses found in other parts of Micronesia. They did not have furniture, except for woven mats, which they used for both floor coverings and clothing. The Marshallese had pierced ears and tattoos. He learned that Marshallese families practiced infanticide after the birth of a third child as a form of population planning due to frequent famines. He also noted that Marshallese iroij held considerable authority and rights to all property, though he had a more favorable view of the condition of Marshallese commoners than of that of Polynesian commoners. The Marshalls' two island groups, the Ratak and Ralik chains, were each ruled by a paramount chief, or iroijlaplap, who held authority over the individual island iroij.

=== European exploration ===
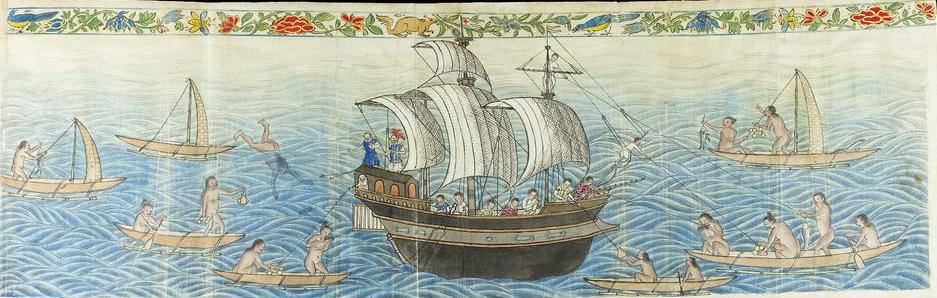
Manila Galleon in the Marianas and Carolines, c. 1590 Boxer Codex

On August 21, 1526, Spanish explorer Alonso de Salazar was the first European to sight the Marshall Islands. While commanding the Santa Maria de la Victoria, he sighted an atoll with a green lagoon, which may have been Taongi. The crew could not land, because of strong currents and water too deep for the ship's anchor, so the ship sailed for Guam two days later.

On January 2, 1528, the expedition of Álvaro de Saavedra Cerón landed on an uninhabited island, possibly in Ailinginae Atoll, where they resupplied and stayed for six days. Natives from a neighboring island briefly met the Spanish. This expedition named the islands 'Los Pintados' or "the Painted Ones" for the natives who wore tattoos. Later Spanish explorers of the Marshalls included Ruy López de Villalobos, Miguel López de Legazpi, Alonso de Arellano, and Álvaro de Mendaña de Neira, though coordinates and geographic descriptions in 16th century Spanish logs are sometimes imprecise, leaving uncertainty about the specific islands they sighted and visited.

On July 6, 1565, the Spanish ship San Jeronimo nearly wrecked at Ujelang Atoll after the ship's pilot Lope Martín led a mutiny. While the mutineers were resupplying at Ujelang, several crew members took back control of the ship and marooned Martín and twenty-six other mutineers in the Marshalls. By the late 16th century, Spanish galleons sailing between the Americas and the Philippines kept to a sea lane at 13°N and provisioned at Guam, avoiding the Marshalls, which Spanish sailors saw as unprofitable islands amid hazardous waters.

The British sea captains John Marshall and Thomas Gilbert visited the islands in 1788. Their vessels had been part of the First Fleet taking convicts from England to Botany Bay in New South Wales, and were en route to Guangzhou when they passed through the Gilbert Islands and Marshall Islands. On June 25, 1788, the British ships had peaceful interactions and traded with islanders at Mili Atoll; their meeting may have been the first contact between Europeans and Marshallese since the Mendaña expedition of 1568. Subsequent navigational charts and maps named the islands for John Marshall.

From the 1820s through the 1850s, the Marshall Islanders became increasingly hostile to western vessels, possibly because of violent punishments that sea captains exacted for theft as well as the abduction of Marshallese people for sale into slavery on Pacific plantations. One of the earliest violent encounters occurred in February 1824, when the inhabitants of Mili Atoll massacred marooned sailors from the American whaler Globe. Similar encounters occurred as late as 1851 and 1852, when three separate Marshallese attacks on ships occurred at Ebon, Jaluit, and Namdrik Atolls.

=== Colonial period ===
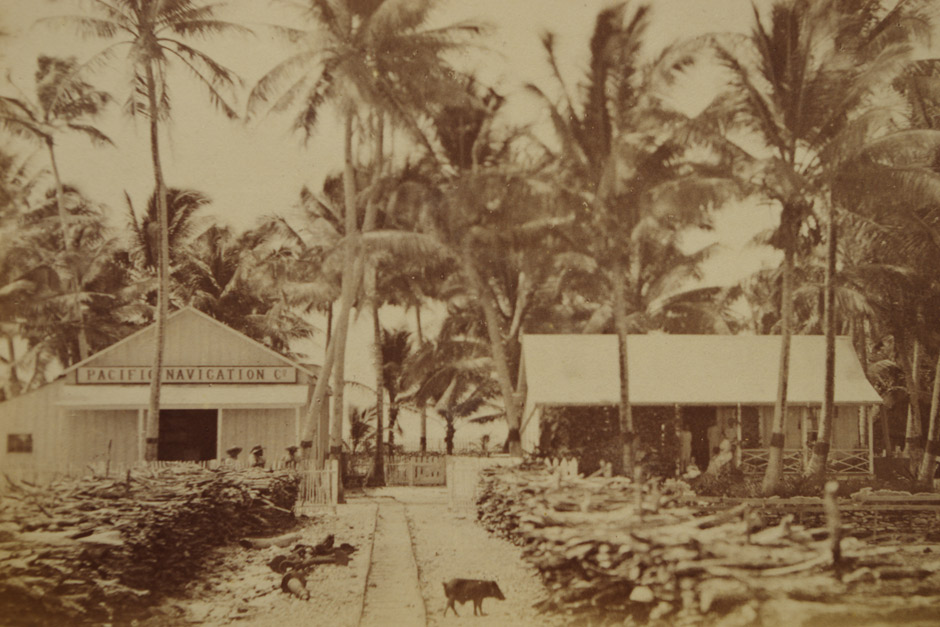
Offices of the Pacific Navigation Co. at Jaluit Atoll in the late 1880s

In 1857, American Board of Commissioners for Foreign Missions sent two families to establish a mission church and school at Ebon. By 1875, the missionaries had established churches on five atolls and had baptized more than 200 islanders, and one traveler noted that most women on Ebon wore western clothes and many men wore trousers by the mid-1870s.

In 1859, Adolph Capelle and another merchant arrived at Ebon and set up a trading post for the German company Hoffschlaeger & Stapenhorst. When the firm went bankrupt in 1863, Capelle partnered with Portuguese ex-whaler Anton Jose DeBrum to establish a copra trading firm: Capelle & Co. In 1873, the company moved its headquarters to Jaluit, the home of Kabua, a powerful iroij and disputed successor for the paramount chieftainship of the southern Ralik Chain. In the 1870s, various other companies from Germany, Hawaii, New Zealand, and the United States engaged in the copra trade in the Marshall Islands. By 1885, the German firms Hernsheim & Co. and Deutsche Handels- und Plantagen-Gesellschaft Der Südsee Inseln zu Hamburg controlled two-thirds of the trade.

Contact between the Marshallese and westerners led to sometimes lethal outbreaks of western diseases, including influenza, measles, syphilis, and typhoid fever. Increased access to alcohol led to social problems in some Marshallese communities, and on several atolls conflicts erupted between rival iroij with access to firearms.

==== German protectorate ====
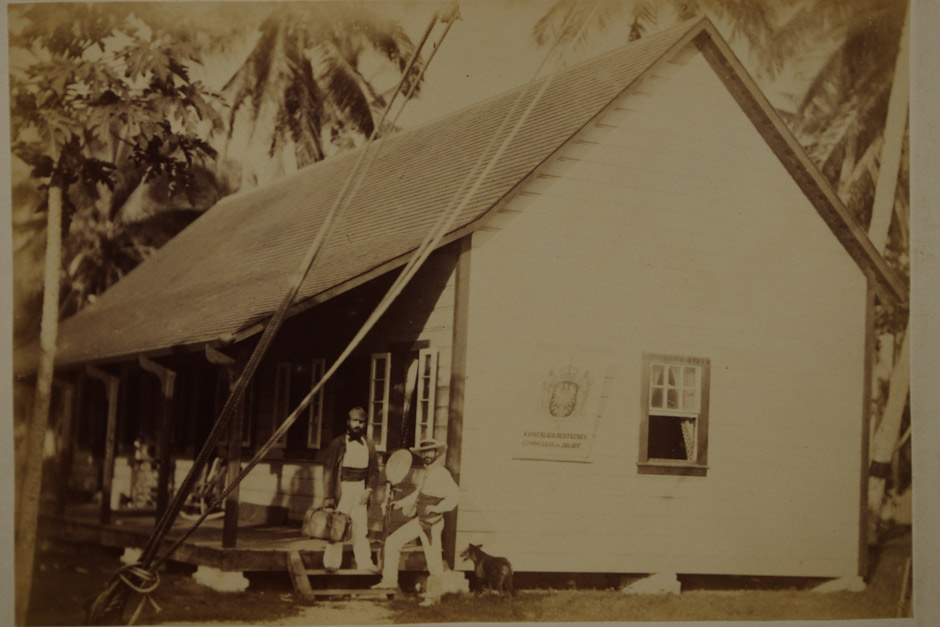
German colonial administration building at Jaluit Atoll in 1886

In 1875, the British and German governments conducted a series of secret negotiations to divide the Western Pacific into spheres of influence. The German sphere included the Marshall Islands. On November 26, 1878, the German warship SMS Ariadne anchored at Jaluit to begin treaty negotiations with the chiefs to grant the German Empire "most favored nation" status in the Ralik Chain. During the second day of negotiations, Captain Bartholomäus von Werner ordered his men to give military demonstrations which he later said were intended to "show the islanders, who have not seen anything like it before, the power of the Europeans." On November 29, Werner signed a treaty with Kabua and several other Ralik Chain iroij which secured a German fuelling station at Jaluit and free use of the atoll's harbor.

On August 29, 1885, German Chancellor Otto von Bismarck authorized the annexation of the Marshall Islands as a protectorate following repeated petitions by German business interests. The German gunboat Nautilus docked at Jaluit on October 13 to take control. On October 15, iroij Kabua, Loeak, Nelu, Lagajime, and Launa signed a protection treaty in German and Marshallese at the German consulate. While the Marshallese text made no distinction of rank among the five chiefs, the German text recognized Kabua as the King of the Marshall Islands, despite an ongoing dispute between Kabua and Loeak over the paramount chieftainship. A company of German marines hoisted the flag of the German Empire over Jaluit, and performed similar ceremonies at seven other atolls in the Marshalls, though several pro-American iroij refused to recognize the German protectorate until threatened with German naval force in mid-1886. Nauru was incorporated into the German Protectorate of the Marshall Islands in 1888, following the Anglo-German Declarations of April 1886.

The German commercial interests formed the joint-stock Jaluit Company, which was responsible for financing the colony's administration. In addition to controlling two-thirds of the Marshallese copra trade, the company had the authority to collect commercial license fees and an annual poll tax. The company also had the right to be consulted on all new laws and ordinances and nominated all colonial administrative staff. The company's licensing fees and legal advantages pushed out American and British competition, creating a monopoly in the German Pacific colonies. The British government protested the regulations benefiting the Jaluit Company as a violation of the Anglo-German Declarations' free-trade provision. On March 31, 1906, the German government assumed direct control and reorganized the Marshall Islands and Nauru as part of the protectorate of German New Guinea.

==== Japanese mandate ====
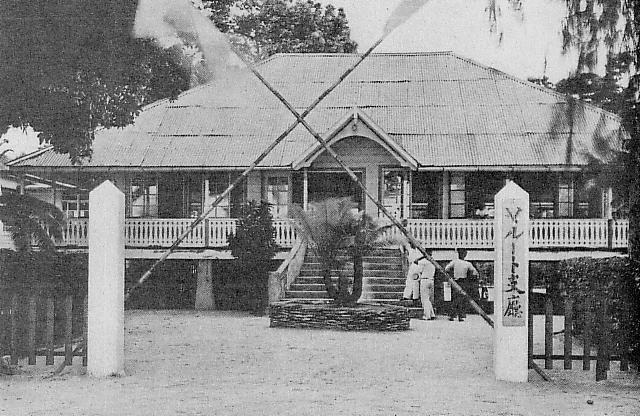
South Seas Government branch office, Jaluit, c. 1932

The Imperial Japanese Navy invaded Enewetak on September 29, 1914, and Jaluit on September 30 at the beginning of World War I. An occupation force was stationed on Jaluit on October 3. At the Paris Peace Conference in 1919, Germany's Pacific colonies north of the equator became the Japanese South Seas Mandate under the system of League of Nations mandates. Germany ceded the Marshall Islands to Japan with the signing of the Treaty of Versailles on June 28, 1919.

The Japanese navy administered the islands from late 1914 through 1921. The civilian South Seas Government (南洋廳, Nan'yō-chō) set up its headquarters in Palau in April 1922 and administered the Marshalls until World War II. Japanese surveys determined that the Marshalls' value was primarily strategic, because they could enable future southward expansion. The Marshalls also continued to be a major producer of copra during the Japanese period, with the South Seas Trading Company (南洋貿易会社, Nan'yō Bōeki Kaisha) taking over the Jaluit Company's operations and building upon the German colonial infrastructure. Other parts of the South Seas Mandate experienced heavy Japanese settlement, shifting the population to majority Japanese in the Northern Mariana Islands and Palau, but Japanese settlers remained a minority under 1,000 people in the Marshall Islands throughout the Japanese period, because the islands were distant from Japan and had the most limited economic potential in Micronesia.

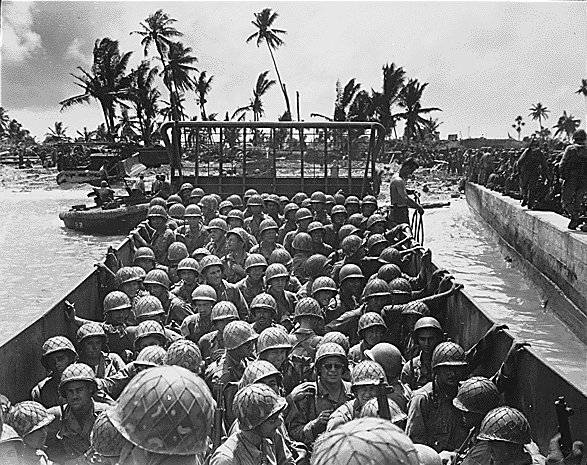
Battle of Kwajalein in 1944

On March 27, 1933, Japan declared its intentions to withdraw from the League of Nations, officially withdrawing in 1935 but continuing to control the territory of the South Seas Mandate. Japanese military planners initially discounted the Marshalls as too distant and indefensible for extensive fortification, but as Japan developed long-range bombers, the islands became useful as a forward base to attack Australia, British colonies, and the United States. In 1939 and 1940, the navy built military airfields on Kwajalein, Maloelap, and Wotje Atolls as well as seaplane facilities at Jaluit.

After the outbreak of the Pacific War, the United States Pacific Fleet carried out the Marshalls–Gilberts raids, which struck Jaluit, Kwajalein, Maloelap, and Wotje on February 1, 1942. They were the first American air raids on Japanese territory. The United States invaded the Marshall Islands on January 31, 1944, during the Gilbert and Marshall Islands campaign. The Americans simultaneously invaded Majuro and Kwajalein. By autumn 1944, the Americans controlled all of the Marshall Islands, except for Jaluit, Maloelap, Mili, and Wotje. As the American campaign advanced through Micronesia and into the Ryukyu Islands, the four Japanese-held atolls were cut off from supplies and subject to American bombardment. The garrisons began running out of provisions in late 1944, leading to high casualties from starvation and disease.

==== U.S. Trust Territory ====
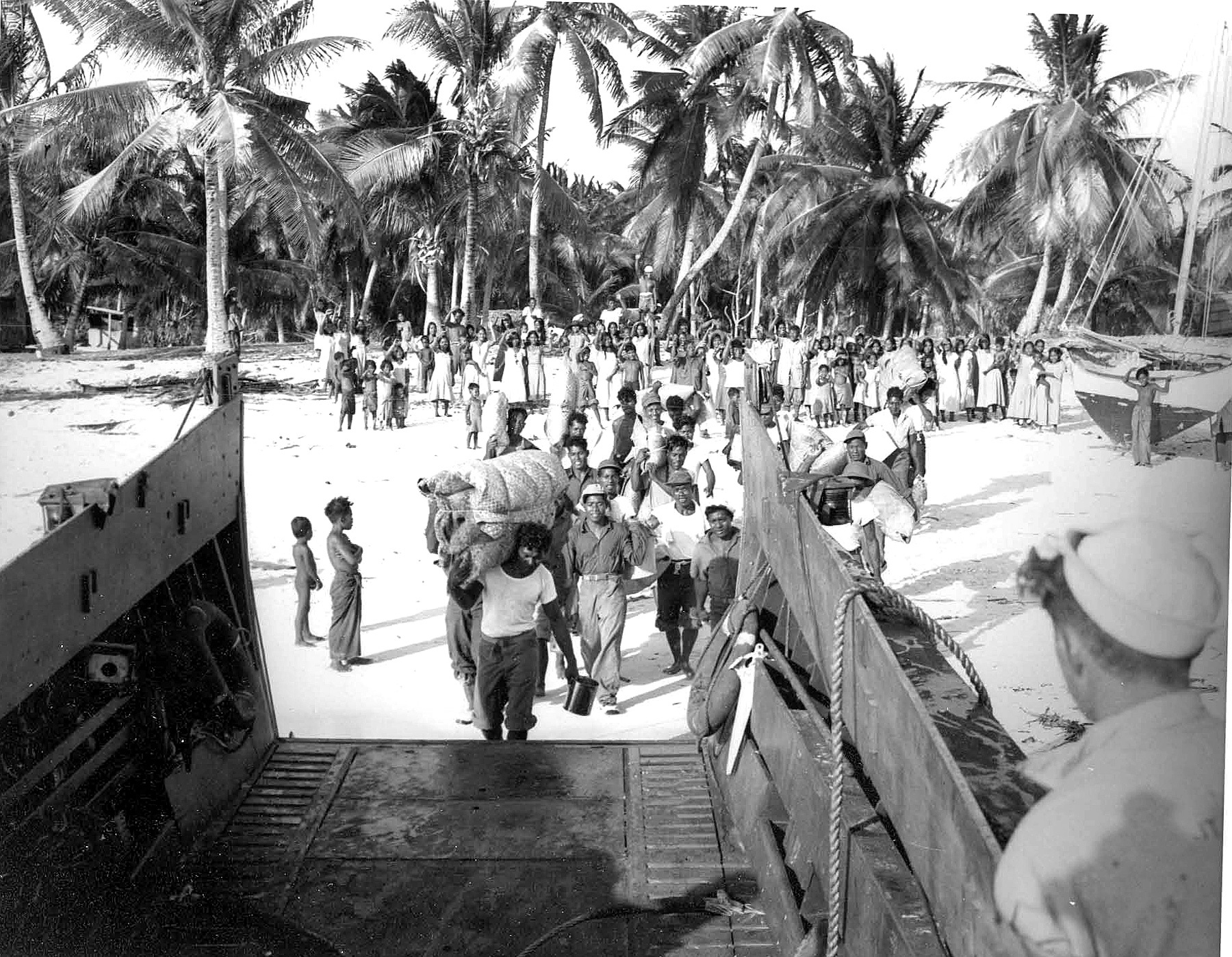
Bikini Islanders being forcibly relocated from Bikini Atoll in March 1946 before the U.S. Operation Crossroads atomic bomb testing commenced

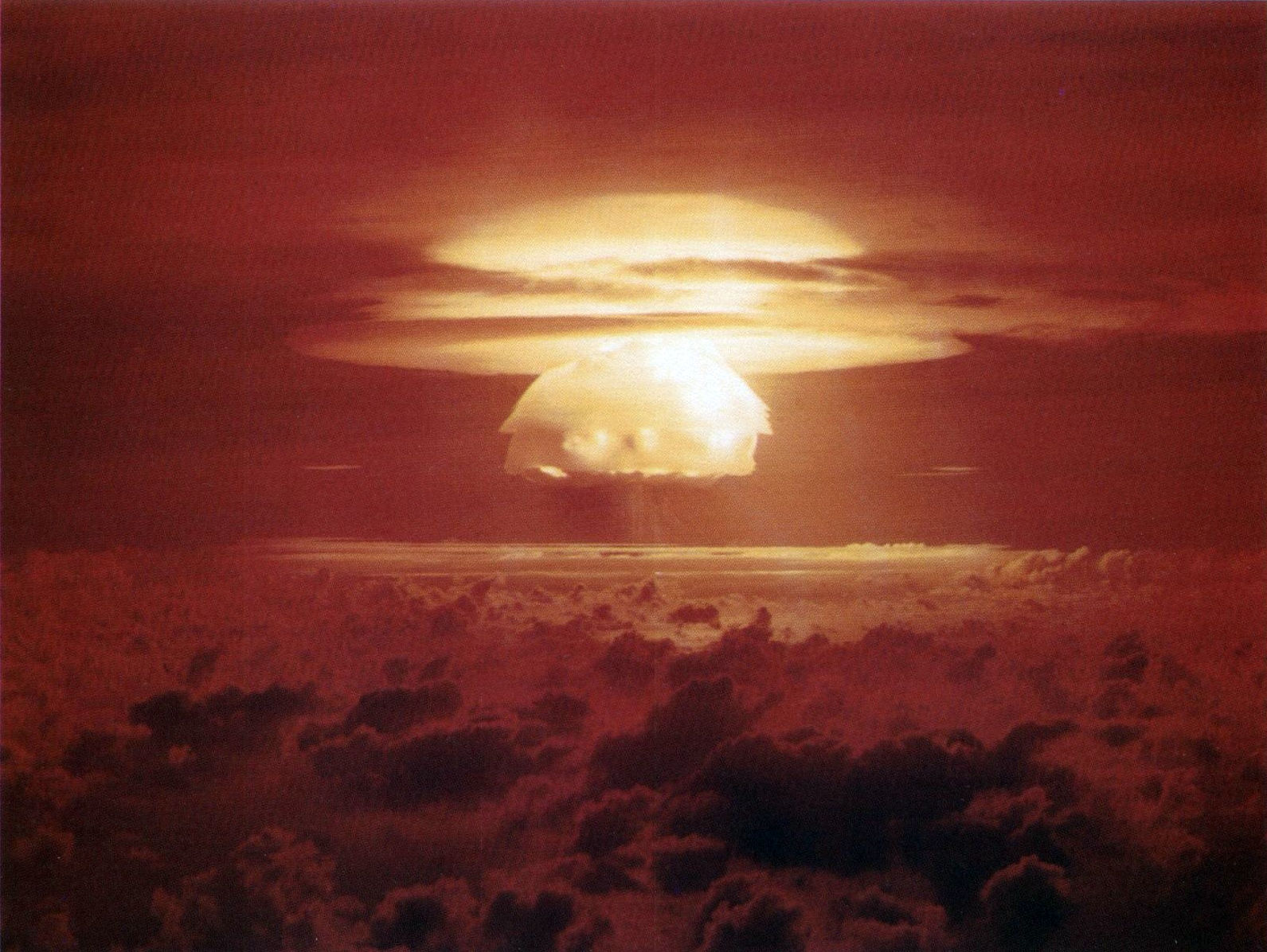
Mushroom cloud from the largest atmospheric nuclear test the United States ever conducted, Castle Bravo

In 1947, the United States entered into an agreement with the UN Security Council to administer much of Micronesia, including the Marshall Islands, as the Trust Territory of the Pacific Islands.

From 1946 to 1958, it served as the Pacific Proving Grounds for the United States and was the site of 67 nuclear tests on various atolls.

Operation Crossroads atomic bomb testing began in 1946 on Bikini Atoll after some of the residents were forcibly evacuated.

The world's first hydrogen bomb, codenamed "Mike", was tested at the Enewetak atoll in the Marshall Islands on November 1 (local date) in 1952, producing significant fallout in the region.

Only one of over 60 islands was cleaned by the U.S. government, and the 2 billion dollars in compensation assessed by the Nuclear Claims Tribunal has never been paid. Many of the islanders and their descendants still live in exile, as the islands are contaminated with high levels of radiation.

A radar installation was constructed on Kwajalein atoll.

=== Independence ===
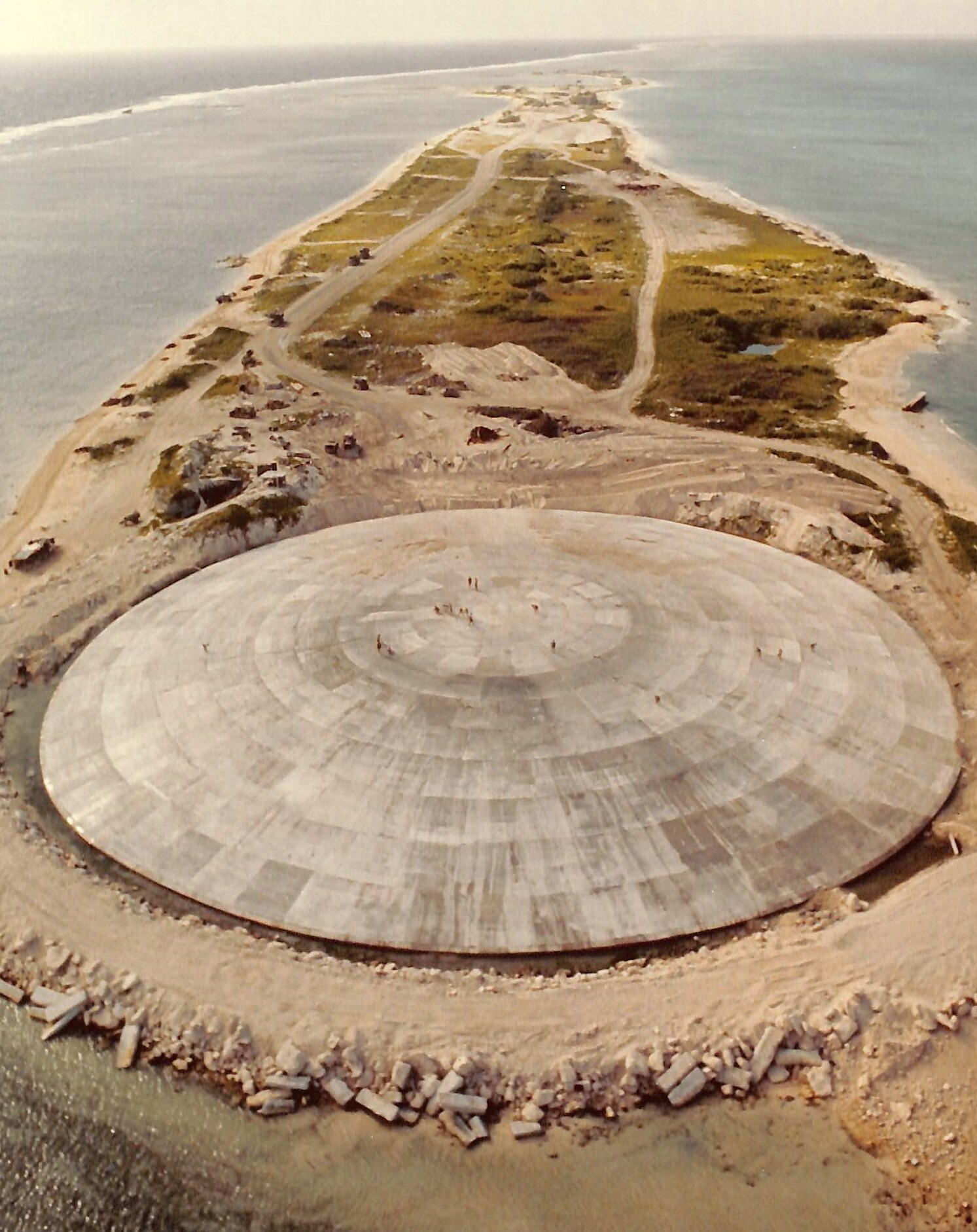
The Runit Dome, built to contain radioactive debris

On May 1, 1979, in recognition of the evolving political status of the Marshall Islands, the United States recognized the constitution of the Marshall Islands and the establishment of the Government of the Republic of the Marshall Islands. The constitution incorporates both American and British constitutional concepts.

There have been a number of local and national elections since the Republic of the Marshall Islands was founded. The United Democratic Party, running on a reform platform, won the 1999 general election, taking control of the presidency and cabinet.

The islands signed a Compact of Free Association with the United States in 1986. Trusteeship was ended under United Nations Security Council Resolution 683 of December 22, 1990. Until 1999 the islanders received US$180 million for continued American use of Kwajalein atoll, US$250 million in compensation for nuclear testing, and US$600 million in other payments under the compact.

Despite the constitution, the government was largely controlled by Iroij. It was not until 1999, following political corruption allegations, that the aristocratic government was overthrown, with Imata Kabua replaced by the commoner Kessai Note.

The Runit Dome was built on Runit Island to deposit U.S.-produced radioactive soil and debris, including lethal amounts of plutonium. There are ongoing concerns about deterioration of the waste site and a potential radioactive spill.

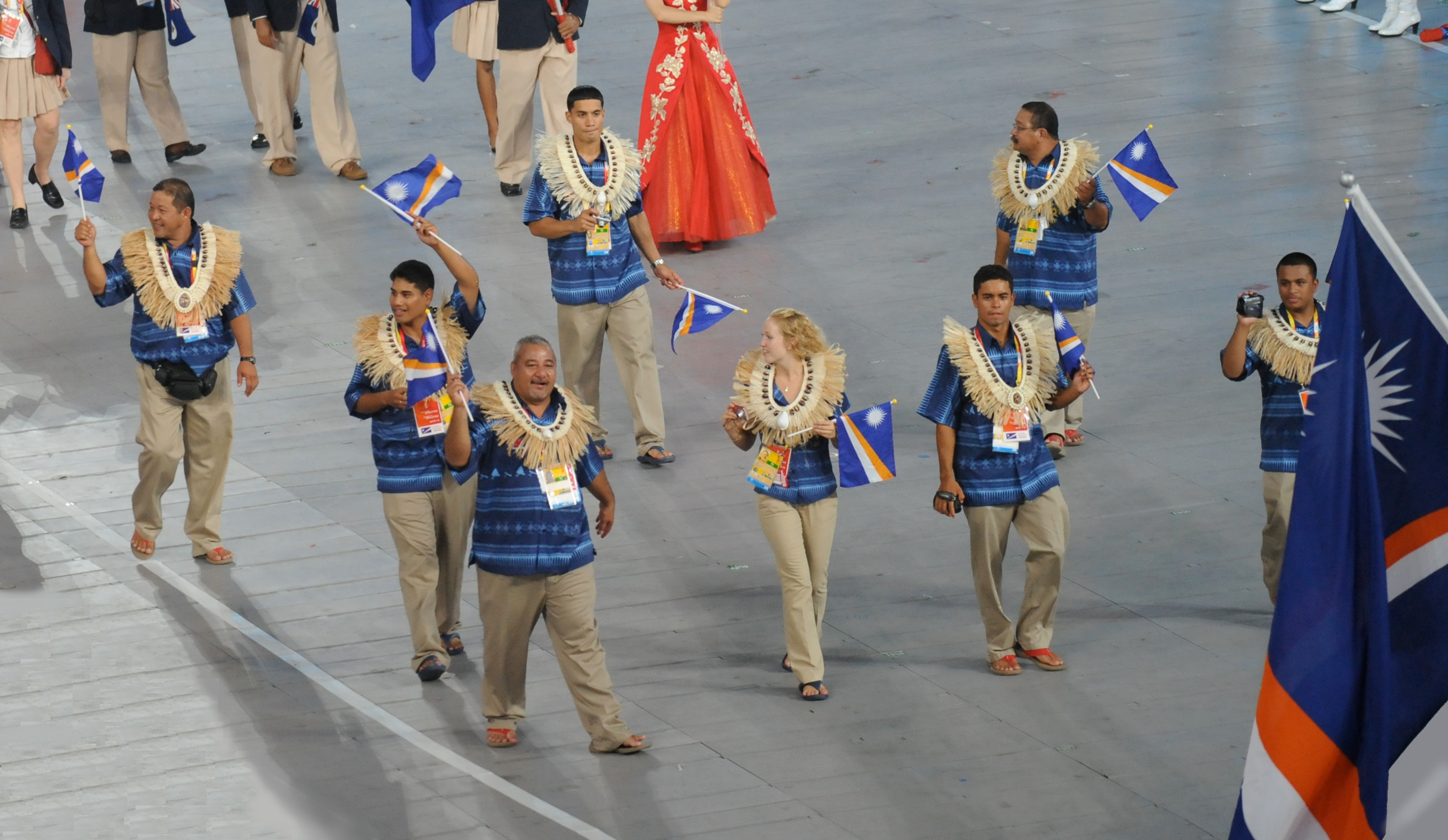
Marshallese enter the 2008 Olympic Games

In February 2018, the Marshall Islands became the first country in the world to recognize its cryptocurrency as its own legal tender for digital currency.

In a January 2020 election, David Kabua, son of founding president Amata Kabua, replaced Hilda Heine as President of the Marshall Islands.

Marshallese began migrating to the US in the late 1980s. The 2010 US Census shows over 7,000 in Hawaii and over 4,000 in Arkansas.

Following independence, the Marshall Islands continued to play a prominent role in testing and launching military and commercial missiles and rockets. All five SpaceX Falcon 1 rockets launched from Omelek Island within the Kwajalein Atoll. The fourth launch of the Falcon 1 was successful, marking the first time a privately developed, fully liquid-fueled launch vehicle achieved orbit.

== Geography ==
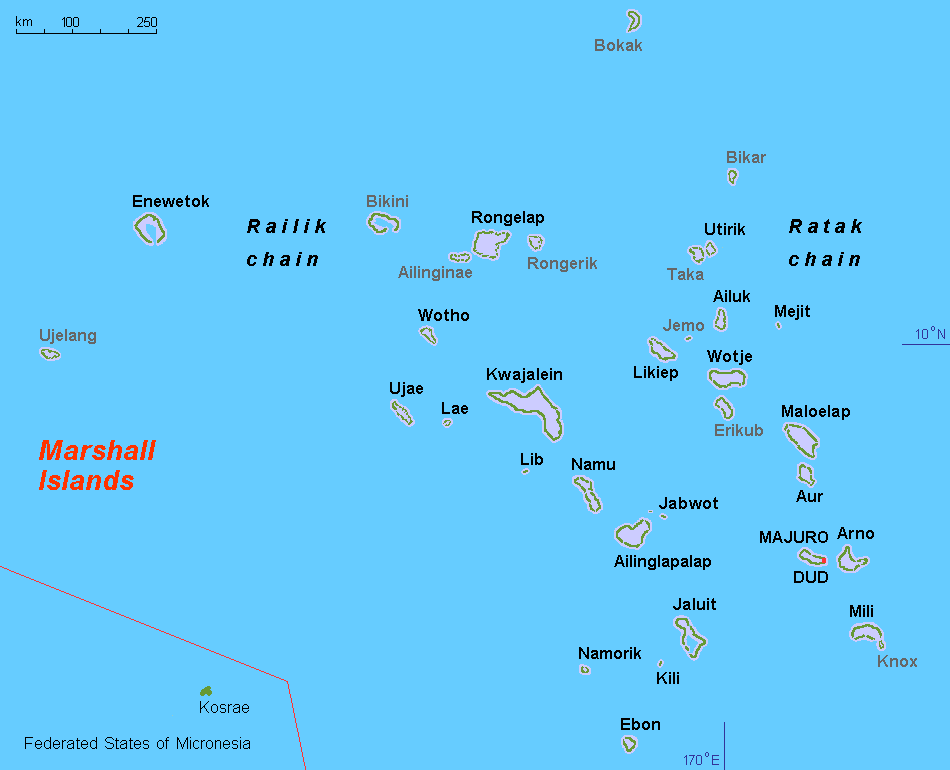
Map of the Marshall Islands

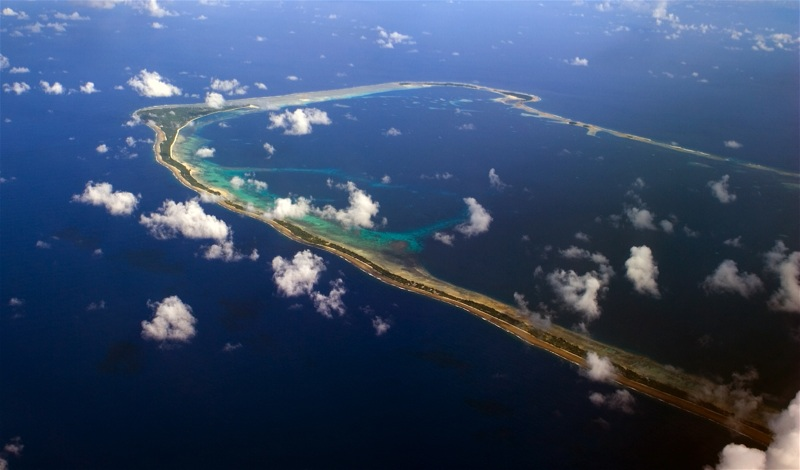
Aerial view of Majuro, one of the many atolls that make up the Marshall Islands

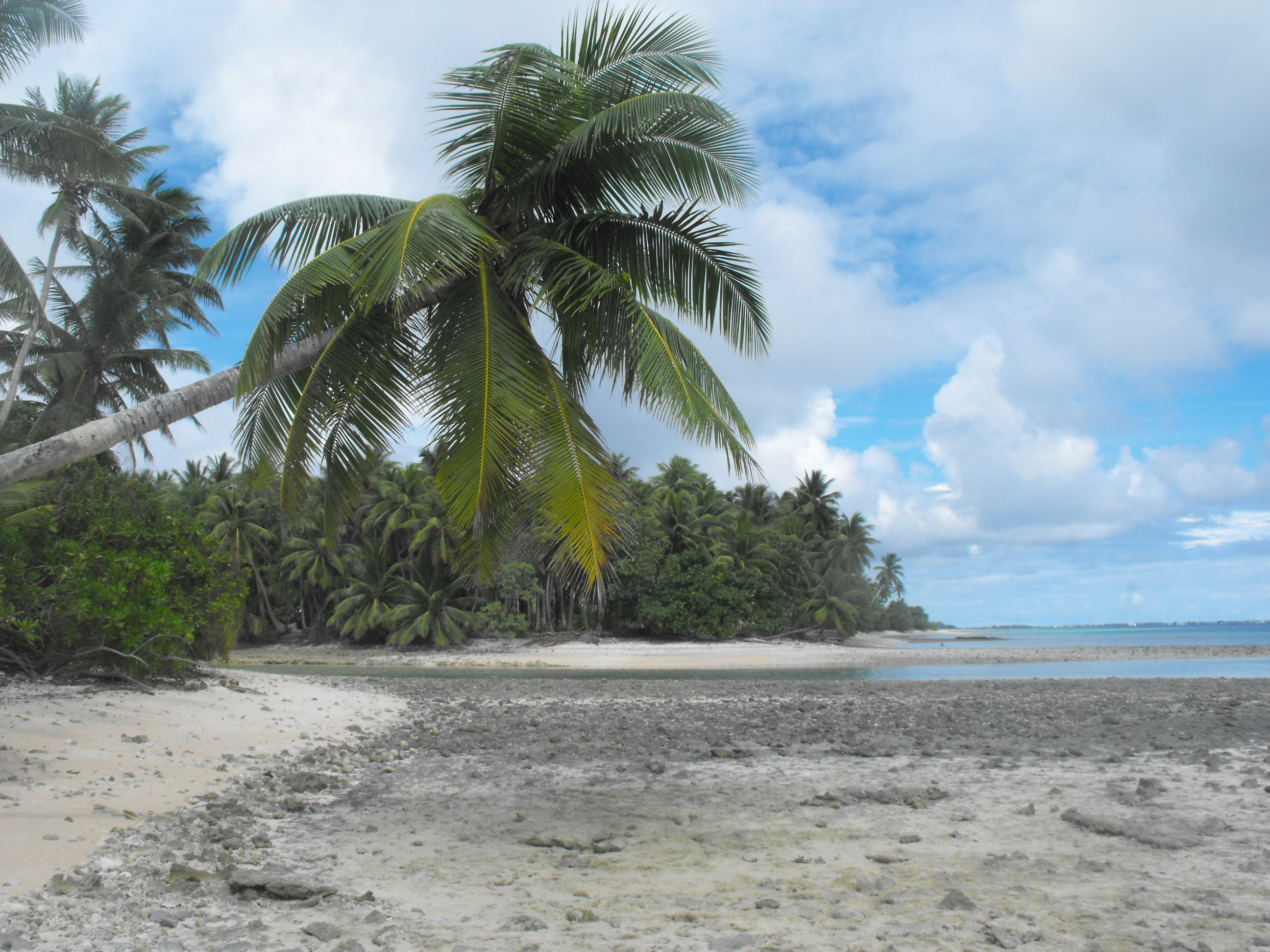
Beach scenery at the islet of Eneko, Majuro

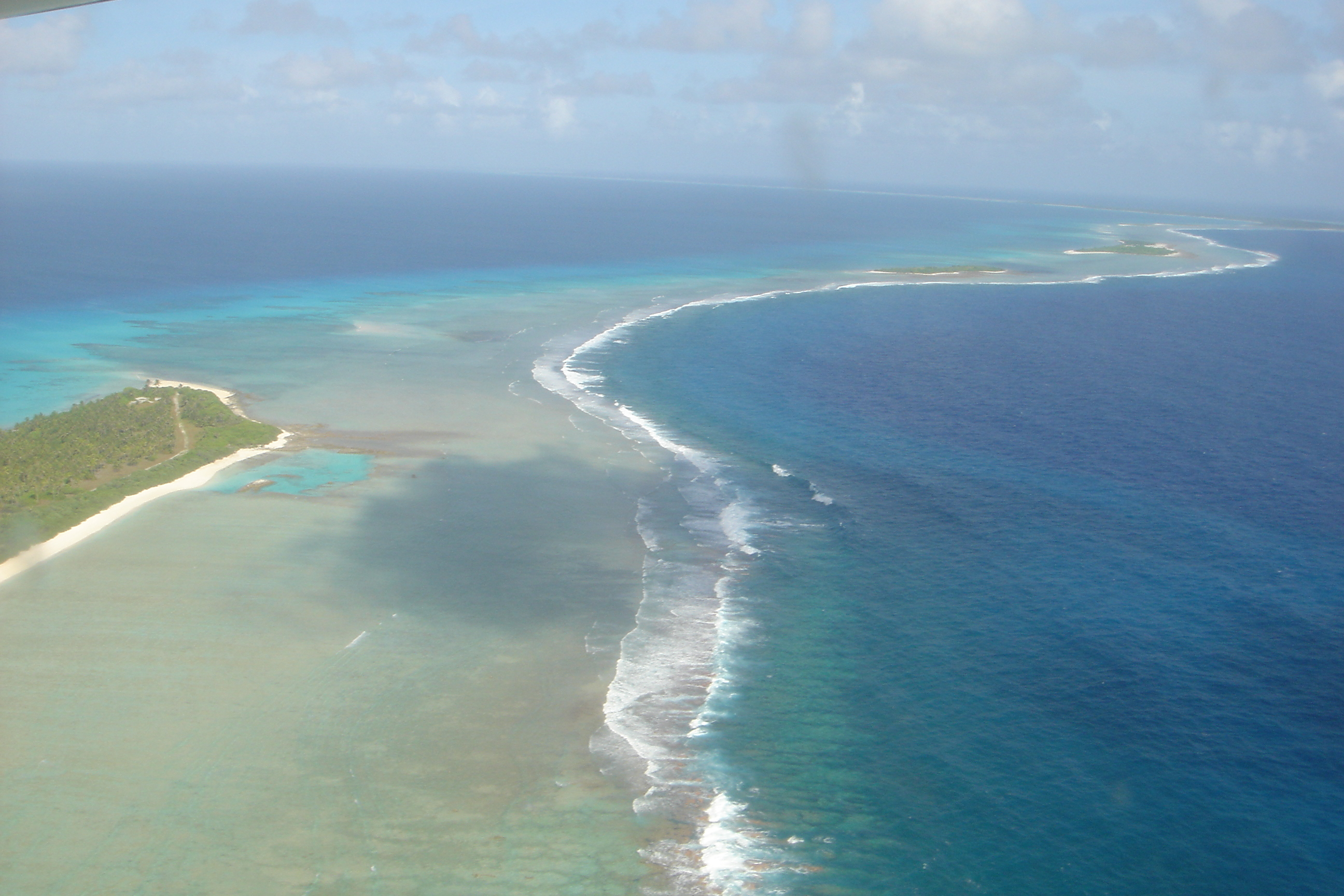
View of the coast of Bikini Atoll from above

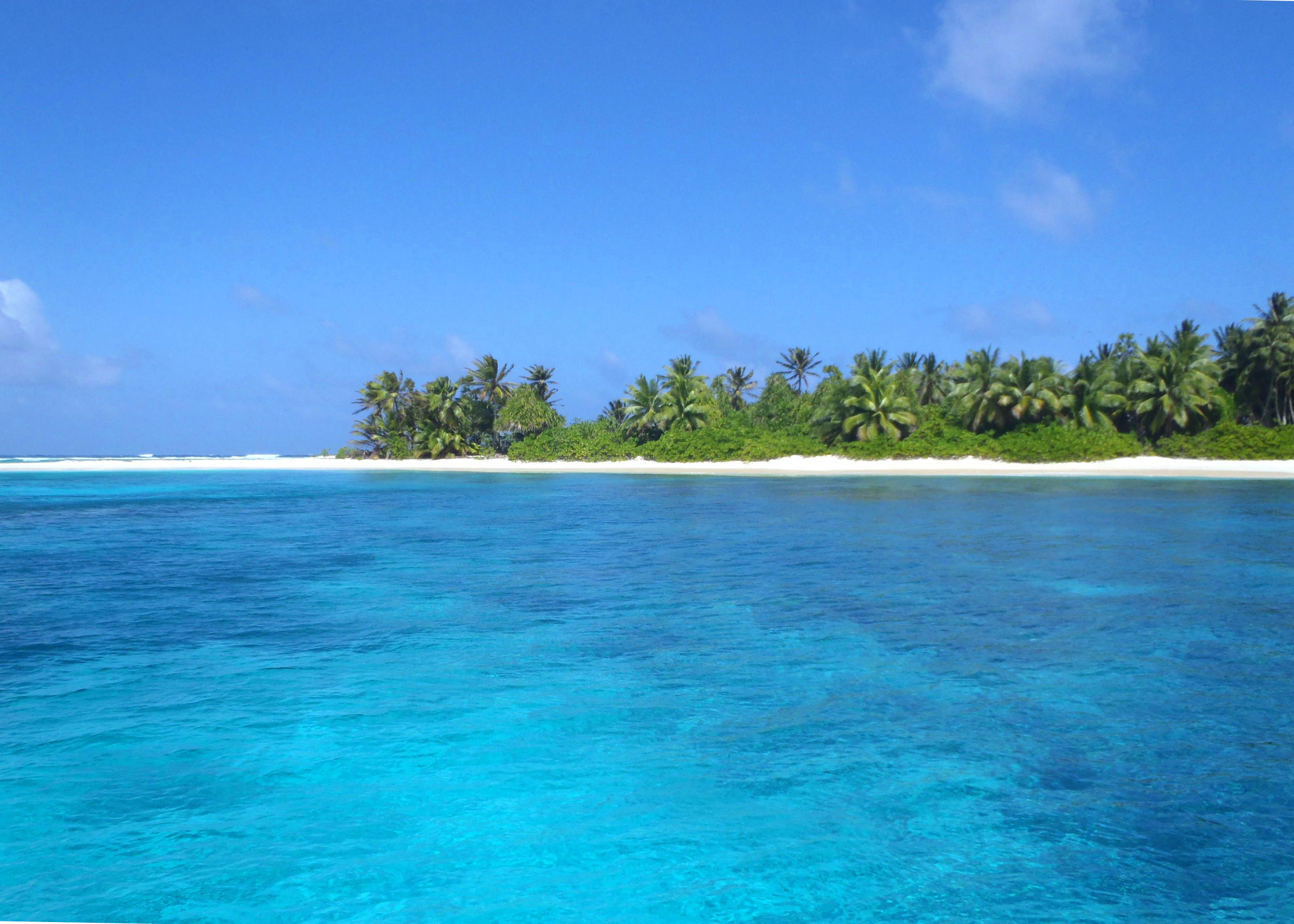
View of Marshall Islands

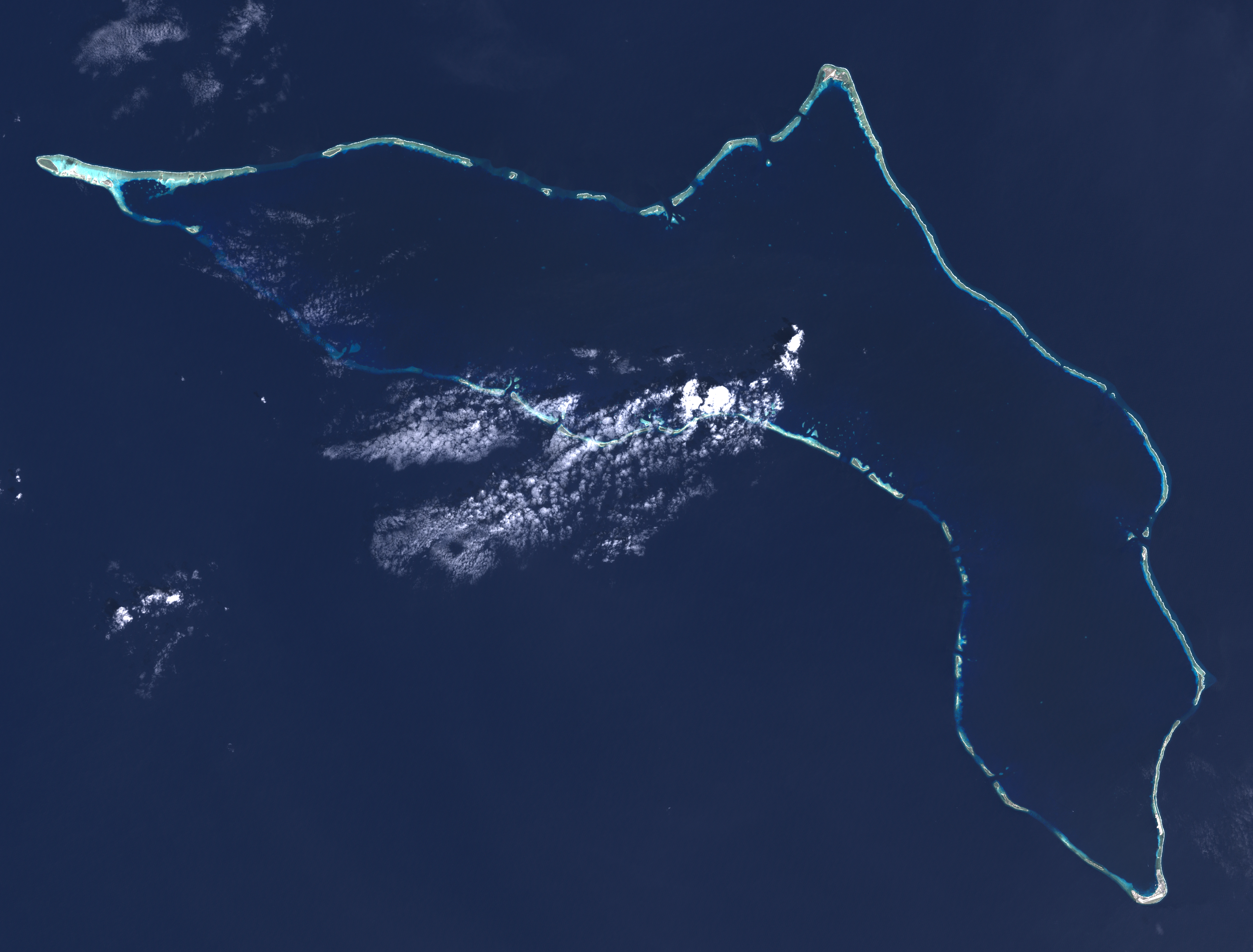
Kwajalein atoll is another important population center for the Marshall Islands.

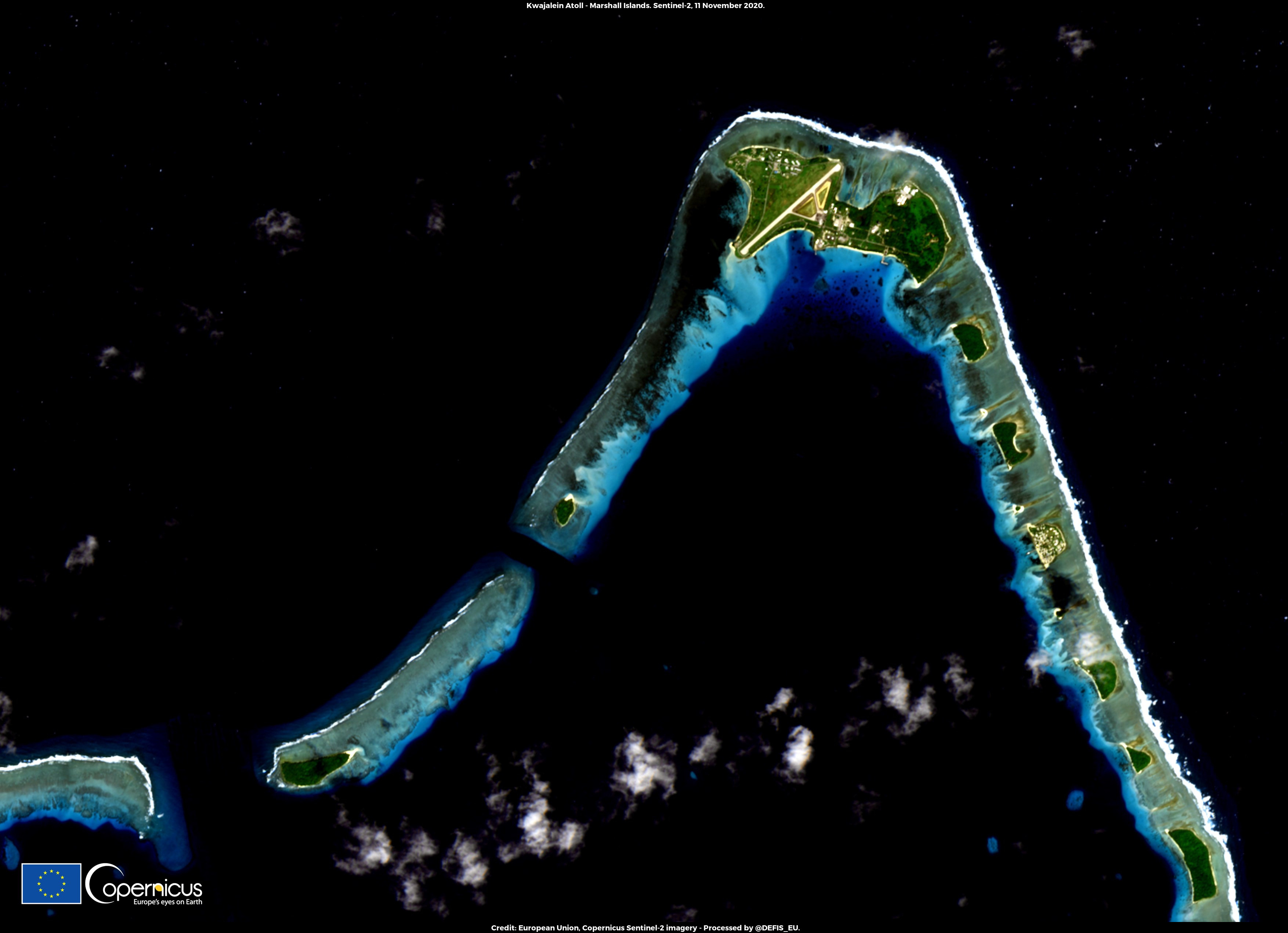
Closer view of Kwajalein atoll reveals a typical geography, the rim of the atoll is dotted with coral islands surrounding a lagoon.

The Marshall Islands sit atop ancient submerged volcanoes rising from the ocean floor, about halfway between Hawaii and Australia, north of Nauru and Kiribati, east of the Federated States of Micronesia, and south of the disputed U.S. territory of Wake Island, to which it also lays claim. The atolls and islands form two groups: the Ratak (sunrise) and the Ralik (sunset). The two island chains lie approximately parallel to one another, running northwest to southeast, comprising about 750,000 square miles (1,900,000 km^{2}) of ocean but only about 70 square miles (180 km^{2}) of land mass. Each includes 15 to 18 islands and atolls.

The country consists of a total of 29 atolls and five individual islands situated in about 180,000 square miles (470,000 km^{2}) of the Pacific. The largest atoll with a land area of 6 square miles (16 km^{2}) is Kwajalein. It surrounds a 655-square-mile (1,700 km^{2}) lagoon.

Twenty-four of the atolls and islands are inhabited. The remaining atolls are uninhabited due to poor living conditions, lack of rain, or nuclear contamination. The uninhabited atolls are:

- Ailinginae Atoll
- Bikar (Bikaar) Atoll
- Bikini Atoll
- Bokak Atoll
- Erikub Atoll
- Jemo Island
- Nadikdik Atoll
- Rongerik Atoll
- Toke Atoll
- Ujelang Atoll

The average altitude above sea level for the entire country is 7 feet (2.1 m).

=== Shark sanctuary ===
In October 2011, the government declared that an area covering nearly 2,000,000 square kilometers (772,000 sq mi) of ocean shall be reserved as a shark sanctuary. This is the world's largest shark sanctuary, extending the worldwide ocean area in which sharks are protected from 2,700,000 to 4,600,000 square kilometers (1,042,000 to 1,776,000 sq mi). In protected waters, all shark fishing is banned and all by-catch must be released. However, some have questioned the ability of the Marshall Islands to enforce this zone.

=== Territorial claim on Wake Island ===
The Marshall Islands also lays claim to Wake Island based on oral legends. While Wake Island has been administered by the United States since 1899, the Marshallese government refers to it by the name Ānen Kio (new orthography) or Enen-kio (old orthography). The United States does not recognize this claim.

=== Climate ===
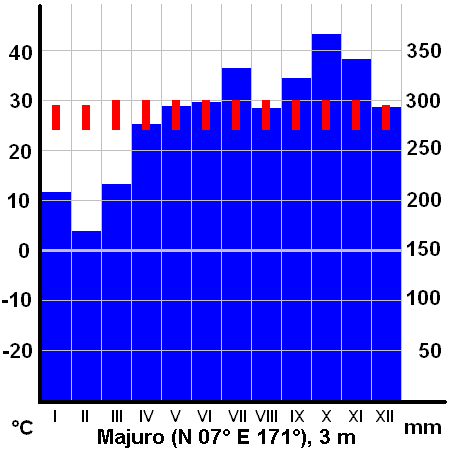
Average monthly temperatures (red) and precipitation (blue) on Majuro

The climate has a relatively dry season from December to April and a wet season from May to November. Many Pacific typhoons begin as tropical storms in the Marshall Islands region and grow stronger as they move west toward the Mariana Islands and the Philippines.

Population has outstripped the supply of fresh water, usually from rainfall. The northern atolls get 50 inches (1,300 mm) of rainfall annually; the southern atolls about twice that. The threat of drought is commonplace throughout the island chains.

==== Climate change ====
Climate change is a threat to the Marshall Islands, with typhoons becoming stronger and sea levels rising. The sea around the Pacific islands has risen 0.13 inches (3.4 mm) a year since 1993, which is more than twice the worldwide average rate. In Kwajalein, there is a high risk of permanent flooding; when sea level rises by 3.3 feet (1 m), 37% of buildings will be permanently flooded. In Ebeye, the risk from sea level rise is even higher, with 50% of buildings being permanently flooded in the same scenario. With 3.3 feet (1 m) of sea level rise, parts of the Majuro atoll will be permanently flooded and other parts will have a high risk of flooding especially the eastern part of the atoll would be significantly at risk. With 6.6 feet (2 m) sea level rise all the buildings of Majuro will be permanently flooded or will be at a high risk of being flooded.

The per capita CO_{2} emissions were 2.56 t in 2020. The government pledged to be net zero in 2050, with a decrease of 32% in GHGs in 2025, 45% in 2030 and 58% in 2035, all compared to 2010 levels.

=== Fauna ===
==== Birds ====
Most birds found in the Marshall Islands, with the exception of those few introduced by humans, are either sea birds or migratory species. There are about 70 species of birds, including 31 seabirds. 15 of these species actually nest locally. Sea birds include the black noddy and the white tern. The only land bird is the house sparrow, introduced by humans.

==== Marine ====
There are about 300 species of fish, 250 of which are reef fish.

- Turtles: green turtles, hawksbill, Leatherback sea turtles, and Olive ridley sea turtles.
- Sharks: There are at least 22 shark species including: Blue shark, Silky shark, Bigeye thresher shark, Pelagic thresher shark, Oceanic whitetip shark, and Tawny nurse shark.

==== Arthropods ====
- Scorpions: dwarf wood scorpion, and Common house scorpion. Pseudoscorpions are occasionally found.
- Spiders: Two: Dictis striatipes; and Jaluiticola, a genus of jumping spiders endemic to the Marshall Islands. Its only species is Jaluiticola hesslei.
- Amphipod: One – Talorchestia spinipalma.
- Insects: cockroaches, American cockroaches, short-horned grasshopper, crickets.
- Crabs include hermit crabs, and coconut crabs.

== Demographics ==
Population distribution in the 2010s

Historical population
Year	Pop.	±%
1920	9,800	—
1925	9,644	−1.6%
1930	10,412	+8.0%
1935	10,446	+0.3%
1958	13,928	+33.3%
1967	18,925	+35.9%
1973	24,135	+27.5%
1980	30,873	+27.9%
1988	43,380	+40.5%
1999	50,840	+17.2%
2011	53,158	+4.6%
2021	42,418	−20.2%

Ethnic groups in the Marshall Islands (2021)
Ethnic groups	percent
Marshallese	95.6%
Others	4.4%

Historical population figures for the Marshall Islands are unknown. In 1862, the population of the Islands was estimated at 10,000. In 1960, the population of the Islands was approximately 15,000. The 2021 census counted 42,418 residents, 23,156 of whom (approximately 54.6%) lived on Majuro. 77.7% of the population lived in an urban setting on Majuro or Ebeye, the country's secondary urban center. This figure excludes Marshall Islands natives who have relocated elsewhere; the Compact of Free Association allows them to freely relocate to the United States and obtain work there. Approximately 4,300 Marshall Islands natives relocated to Springdale, Arkansas, in the United States. This figure represents the largest population concentration of Marshall Islands natives outside their island home.

Most residents of the Marshall Islands are Marshallese. Marshallese people are of Micronesian origin and are believed to have migrated from Asia to the Marshall Islands several thousand years ago. A minority of the Marshallese have Asian and European ancestry such as Japanese and German. A Majority have Polynesian and Melanesian ancestry. About one-half of the nation's population lives in Majuro and Ebeye Atolls.

The official languages of the Marshall Islands are English and Marshallese. Both languages are widely spoken.

=== Religion ===
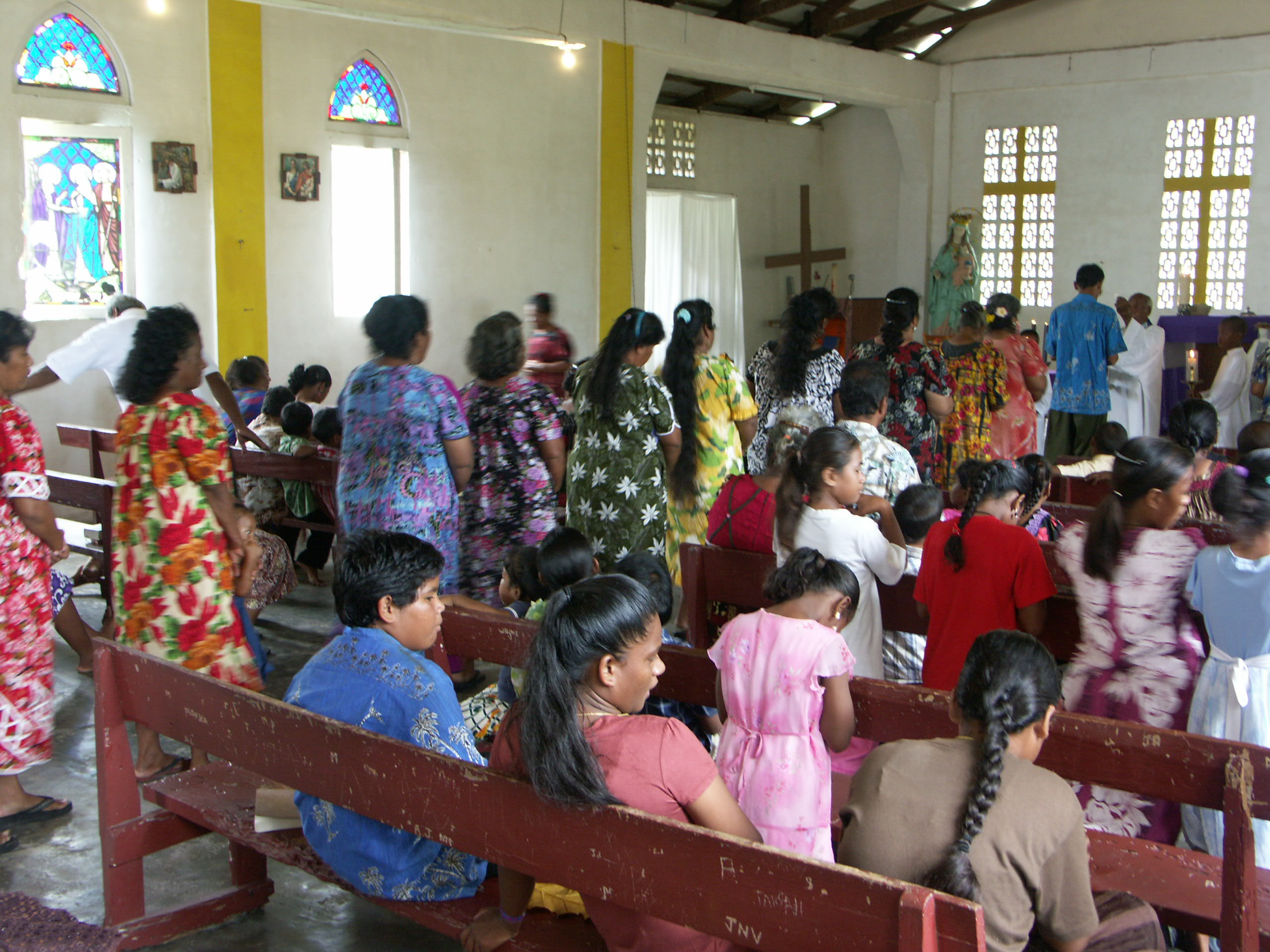
Christians in the Marshall Islands

At the September 2021 census, approximately 96.2% of the population identified with one of fourteen Christian denominations in the Marshall Islands. The denominations with more than 1,000 adherents included the United Church of Christ - Congregational in the Marshall Islands (47.9%), the Assemblies of God (14.1%), the Catholic Church (9.3%), the Church of Jesus Christ of Latter-day Saints (5.7%), the Full Gospel Church of the Marshall Islands (5%), and Bukot nan Jesus (3%).

The remainder of denominations primarily included Protestant churches as well as Jehovah's Witnesses. 1,128 people, or 2.7% of respondents identified as belonging to a religion other than one of the fourteen denominations listed on the census form. 444 people, or 1.1% of respondents claimed to be irreligious. Majuro also has a Baháʼí community and a Muslim community. The country's sole mosque is aligned with the Ahmadiyya movement.

Father A. Erdland, a Catholic priest of the Missionaries of the Sacred Heart of Hiltrup (German Empire, called in German Herz-Jesu-Missionare and in Latin Missionarii Sacratissimi Cordis), lived in Jaluit between 1904 and 1914. After doing considerable research on Marshallese culture and language, he published a 376-page monograph on the islands in 1914. Father H. Linckens, another Sacred Heart missionary, visited the Marshall Islands in 1904 and 1911 for several weeks. In 1912, he published a small work on Catholic missionary activities and the people of the Marshall Islands. The Catholics are under the responsibility of the Apostolic Prefecture of the Marshall Islands (Praefectura Apostolica Insularum Marshallensium), with headquarters at the Cathedral of the Assumption in Majuro, which was created by Pope John Paul II in 1993 through the papal bull Quo expeditius.

=== Health ===
The Castle Bravo test of the first deployable thermonuclear bomb had unforeseen additional nuclear reactions involving lithium-7 that resulted in the explosion being over twice as large as predicted resulting in much larger nuclear fallout than expected. The nuclear fallout spread eastward onto the inhabited Rongelap and Rongerik Atolls. These islands were not evacuated before the explosion. Many of the Marshall Islands natives have since suffered from radiation burns and radioactive dusting, suffering similar fates as the Japanese fishermen aboard the Daigo Fukuryū Maru, but have received little, if any, compensation from the federal government.

In 2010, it was noted the Marshallese were having a problem finding land to bury their dead due to limited land. One solution they developed was to make a double grave by burying another on the same plot.

== Government ==
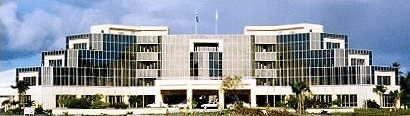
The former Marshall Islands Capitol Building

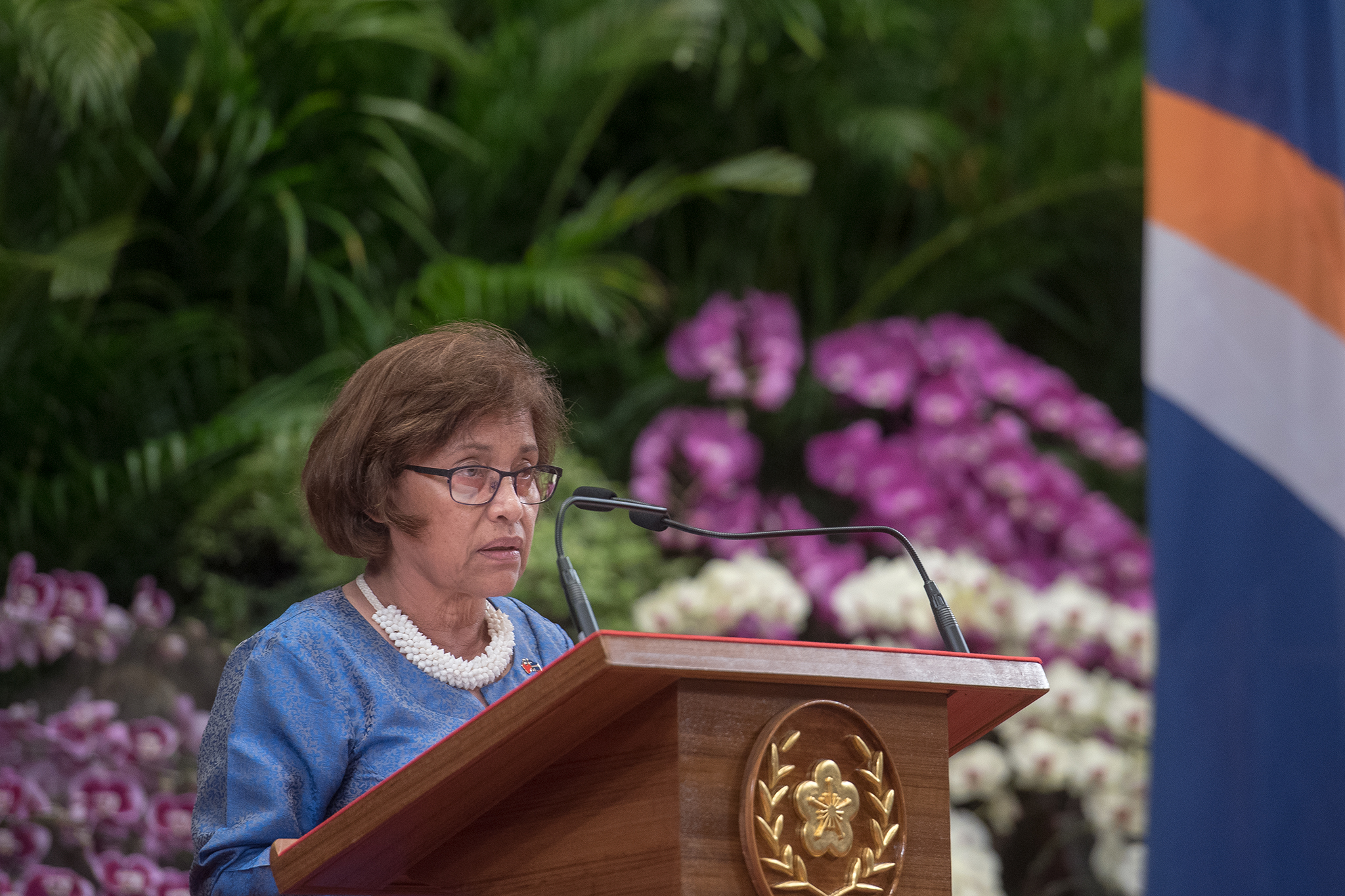
Hilda C. Heine, current and first female president of the Marshall Islands, 2018

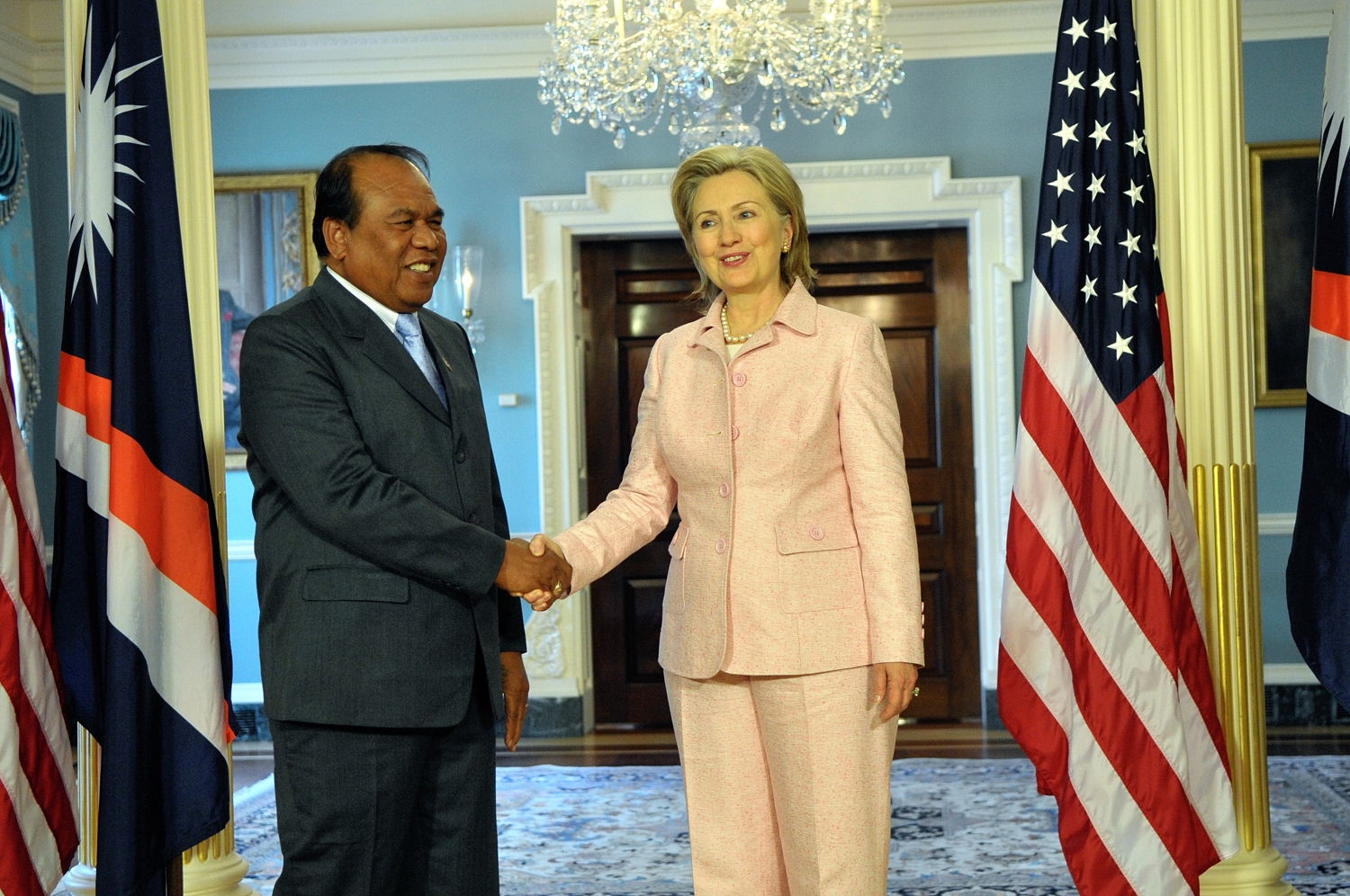
Former Marshallese President Iroij Jurelang Zedkaia meets with US Secretary of State Hillary Clinton, 2010

The government of the Marshall Islands operates under a mixed parliamentary-presidential system as set forth in its 1979 Constitution. Elections are held every four years in universal suffrage (for all citizens above 18), with each of the twenty-four constituencies electing one or more representatives (senators) to the lower house of RMI's unicameral legislature, the Nitijela. (Majuro, the capital atoll, elects five senators.) The President, who is head of state as well as head of government, is elected by the 33 senators of the Nitijela. Four of the five Marshallese presidents who have been elected since the Constitution was adopted in 1979 have been traditional paramount chiefs.

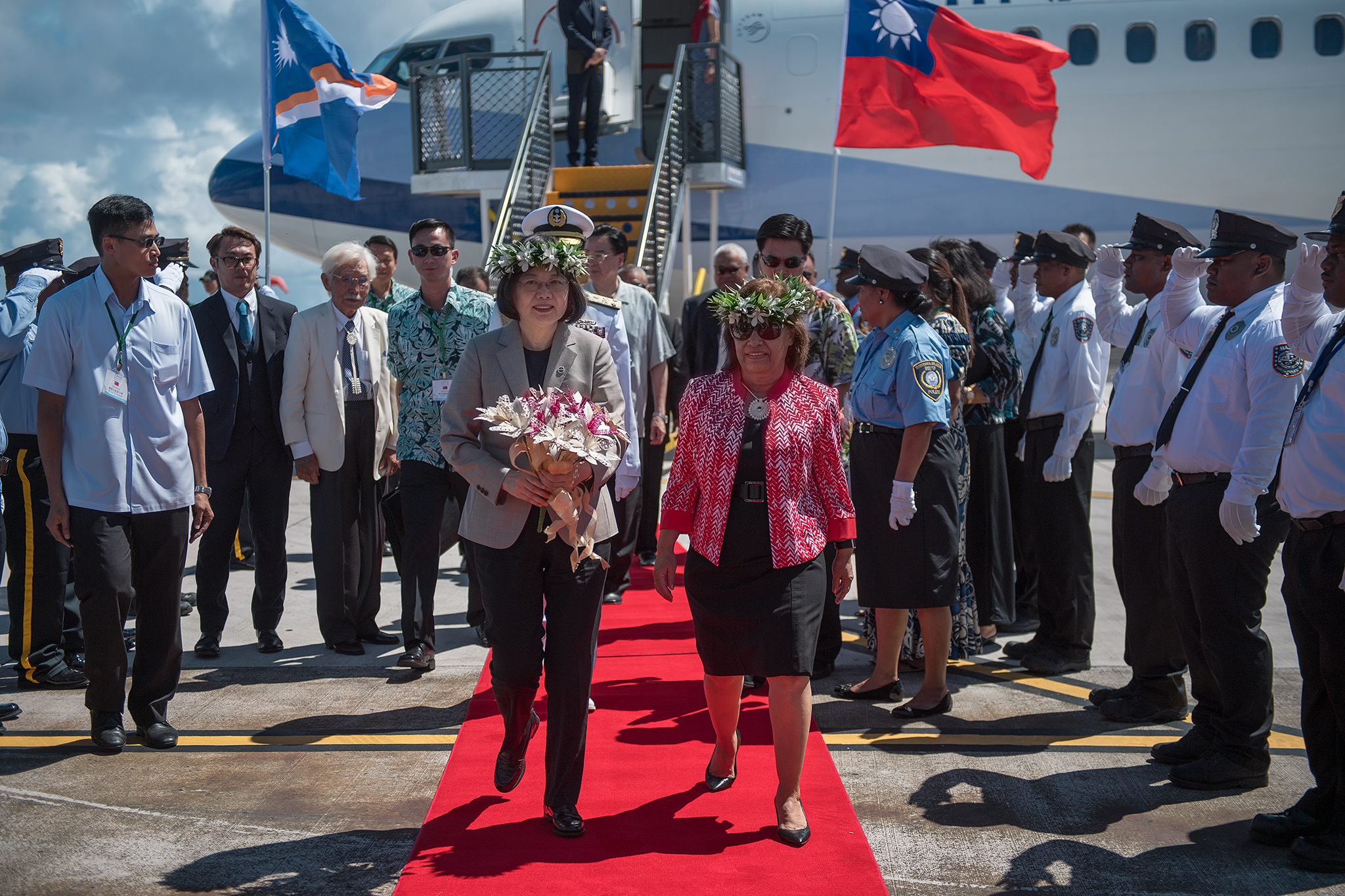
Former President Hilda Heine with Taiwan President Tsai Ing-wen in October 2017

In January 2016, senator Hilda Heine was elected by Parliament as the first female president of the Marshall Islands; previous president Casten Nemra lost office in a vote of no confidence after serving two weeks.

Legislative power lies with the Nitijela. The Council of Iroij is an advisory body comprising twelve paramount chiefs. The executive branch consists of the President and the Presidential Cabinet, which consists of ten ministers appointed by the President with the approval of the Nitijela. The twenty-four electoral districts into which the country is divided correspond to the inhabited islands and atolls. There are currently four political parties in the Marshall Islands: Aelon̄ Kein Ad (AKA), United People's Party (UPP), Kien Eo Am (KEA), and United Democratic Party (UDP). The AKA and the UDP share rulership. The following senators are in the legislative body:

- Ailinglaplap Atoll – Christopher Loeak (AKA), Alfred Alfred Jr. (IND)
- Ailuk Atoll – Maynard Alfred (UDP)
- Arno Atoll – Mike Halferty (KEA), Jejwadrik H. Anton (IND)
- Aur Atoll – Hilda Heine (AKA)
- Ebon Atoll – John M. Silk (UDP)
- Enewetak Atoll – Jack J. Ading (UPP)
- Jabat Island – Kessai Note (UDP)
- Jaluit Atoll – Casten Nemra (IND), Daisy Alik Momotaro (IND)
- Kili Island – Eldon H. Note (UDP)
- Kwajalein Atoll – Michael Kabua (AKA), David Paul (KEA), Alvin Jacklick (KEA)
- Lae Atoll – Thomas Heine (AKA)
- Lib Island – Jerakoj Jerry Bejang (AKA)
- Likiep Atoll – Leander Leander, Jr. (IND)
- Majuro Atoll – Sherwood M. Tibon (KEA), Anthony Muller (KEA), Brenson Wase (UDP), David Kramer (KEA), Kalani Kaneko (KEA)
- Maloelap Atoll – Bruce Bilimon (IND)
- Mejit Island – Dennis Momotaro (AKA)
- Mili Atoll – Wilbur Heine (AKA)
- Namdrik Atoll – Wisely Zackhras (IND)
- Namu Atoll – Tony Aiseia (AKA)
- Rongelap Atoll – Kenneth A. Kedi (IND)
- Ujae Atoll – Atbi Riklon (IND)
- Utirik Atoll – Amenta Matthew (KEA)
- Wotho Atoll – David Kabua (AKA)
- Wotje Atoll – Litokwa Tomeing (UPP)

=== Foreign affairs and defense ===
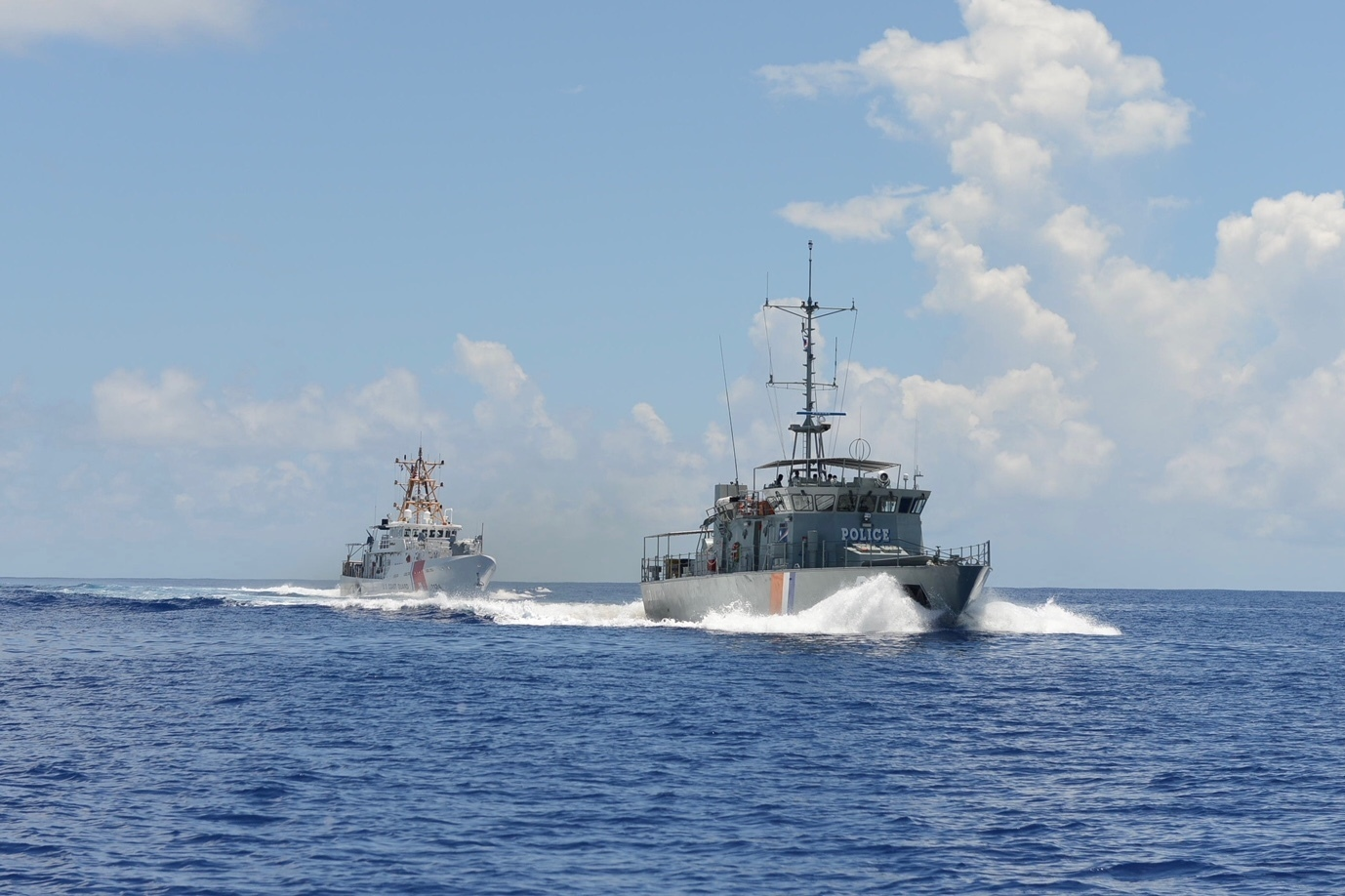
The USCGC Oliver Berry and the RMIS Lomor on a joint patrol

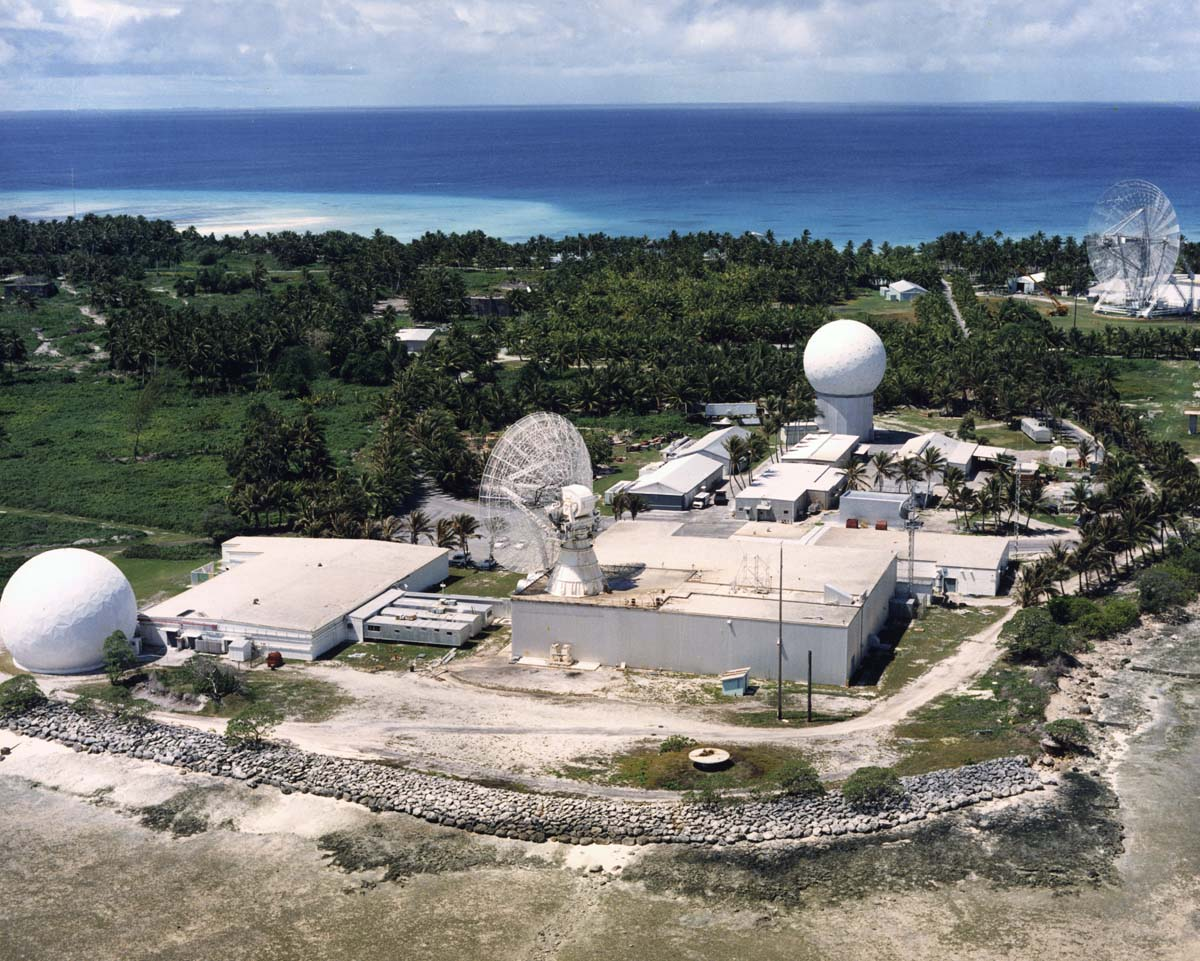
The Marshall Islands host Missile Defense Site

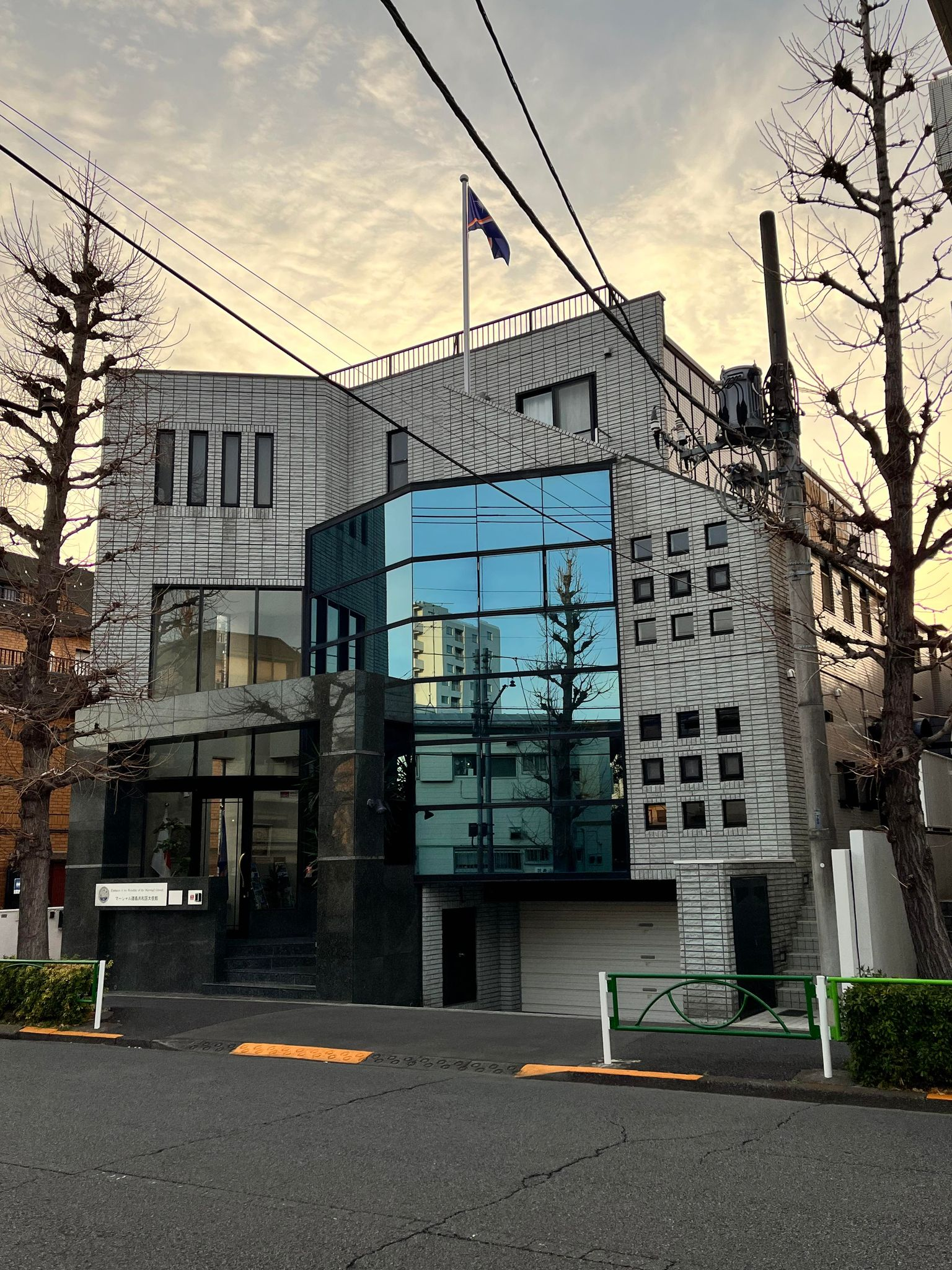
Embassy of the Republic of the Marshall Islands in Japan

The Compact of Free Association with the United States gives the U.S. sole responsibility for international defense of the Marshall Islands. It gives the islanders (the Marshallese) the right to emigrate to the United States without any visa. However, as aliens, they can be placed in removal proceedings if convicted of certain criminal offenses.

The Marshall Islands was admitted to the United Nations based on the Security Council's recommendation on August 9, 1991, in Resolution 704 and the General Assembly's approval on September 17, 1991, in Resolution 46/3. In international politics within the United Nations, the Marshall Islands has often voted consistently with the United States with respect to General Assembly resolutions.

On April 28, 2015, the Iranian navy seized the Marshall Island-flagged MV Maersk Tigris near the Strait of Hormuz. The ship had been chartered by Germany's Rickmers Ship Management, which stated that the ship contained no special cargo and no military weapons. The ship was reported to be under the control of the Iranian Revolutionary Guard according to the Pentagon. Tensions escalated in the region due to the intensifying of Saudi-led coalition attacks in Yemen. The Pentagon reported that the destroyer USS Farragut and a maritime reconnaissance aircraft were dispatched upon receiving a distress call from the ship Tigris and it was also reported that all 34 crew members were detained. US defense officials have said that they would review US defense obligations to the government of the Marshall Islands in the wake of recent events and also condemned the shots fired at the bridge as "inappropriate". It was reported in May 2015 that Tehran would release the ship after it paid a penalty.

In March 2017, at the 34th regular session of the UN Human Rights Council, Vanuatu made a joint statement on behalf of the Marshall Islands and some other Pacific nations raising human rights violations in the Western New Guinea, which has been occupied by Indonesia since 1963, and requested that the UN High Commissioner for Human Rights produce a report. Indonesia rejected allegations.

Since 1991 the Republic of Marshall Islands Sea Patrol, a division of Marshall Islands Police, has operated the 160-ton patrol vessel RMIS Lomor. Lomor is one of 22 Pacific Forum patrol vessels Australia provided to smaller nations in the Pacific Forum. While some other nations' missions for their vessels include sovereignty and protection, the terms of the Compact of Free Association restrict Lomor to civilian missions, like fishery protection and search and rescue.

In 2021, the governments of Australia and Japan decided to fund two major law enforcement developments in the Marshall Islands.

In February 2021, the Marshall Islands announced it would be formally withdrawing from the Pacific Islands Forum in a joint statement with Kiribati, Nauru, and the Federated States of Micronesia after a dispute regarding Henry Puna's election as the forum's secretary-general.

== Culture ==
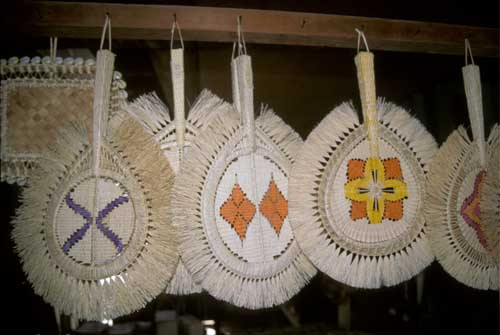
Marshallese fans

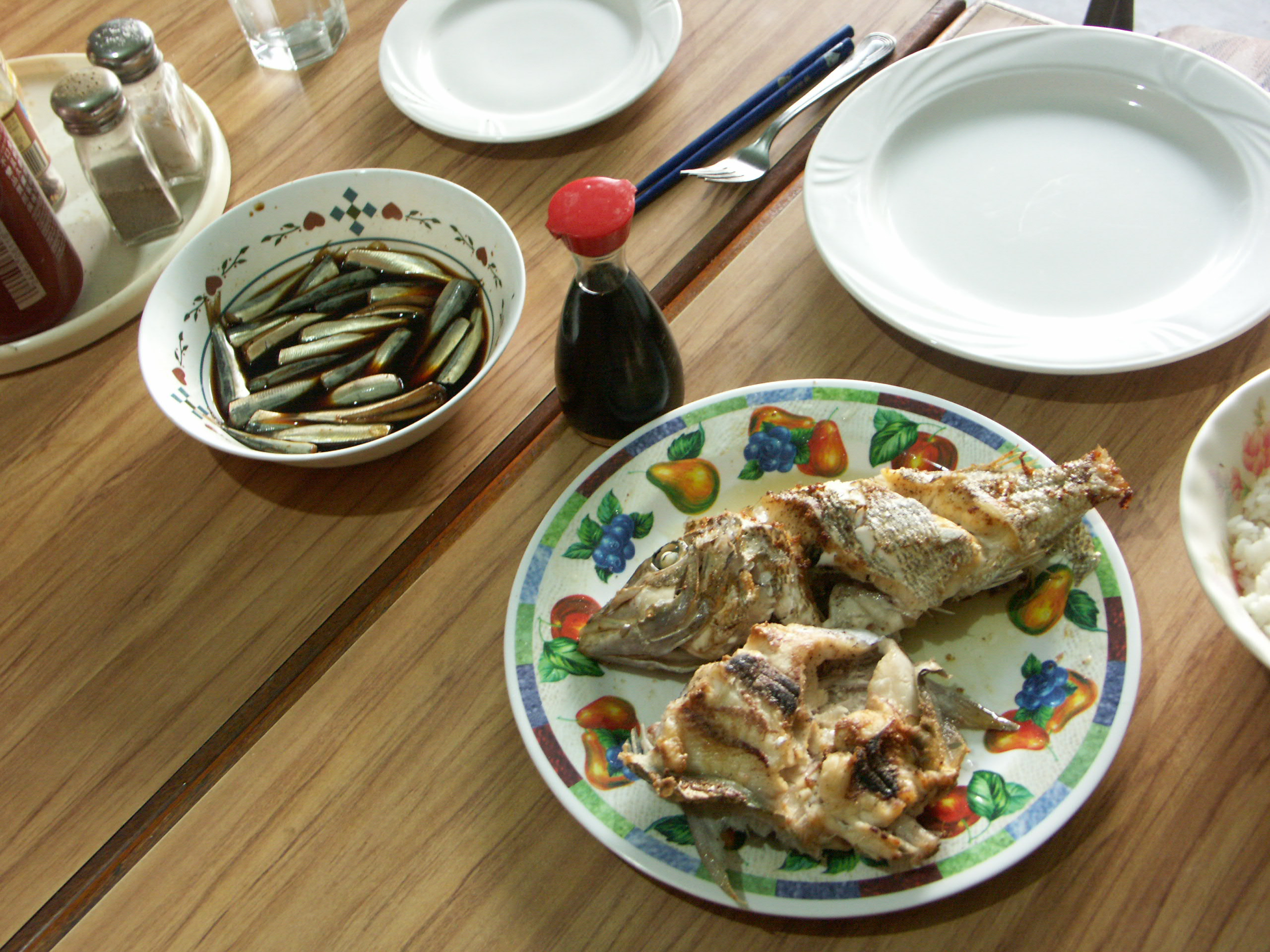
Marshalese cuisine

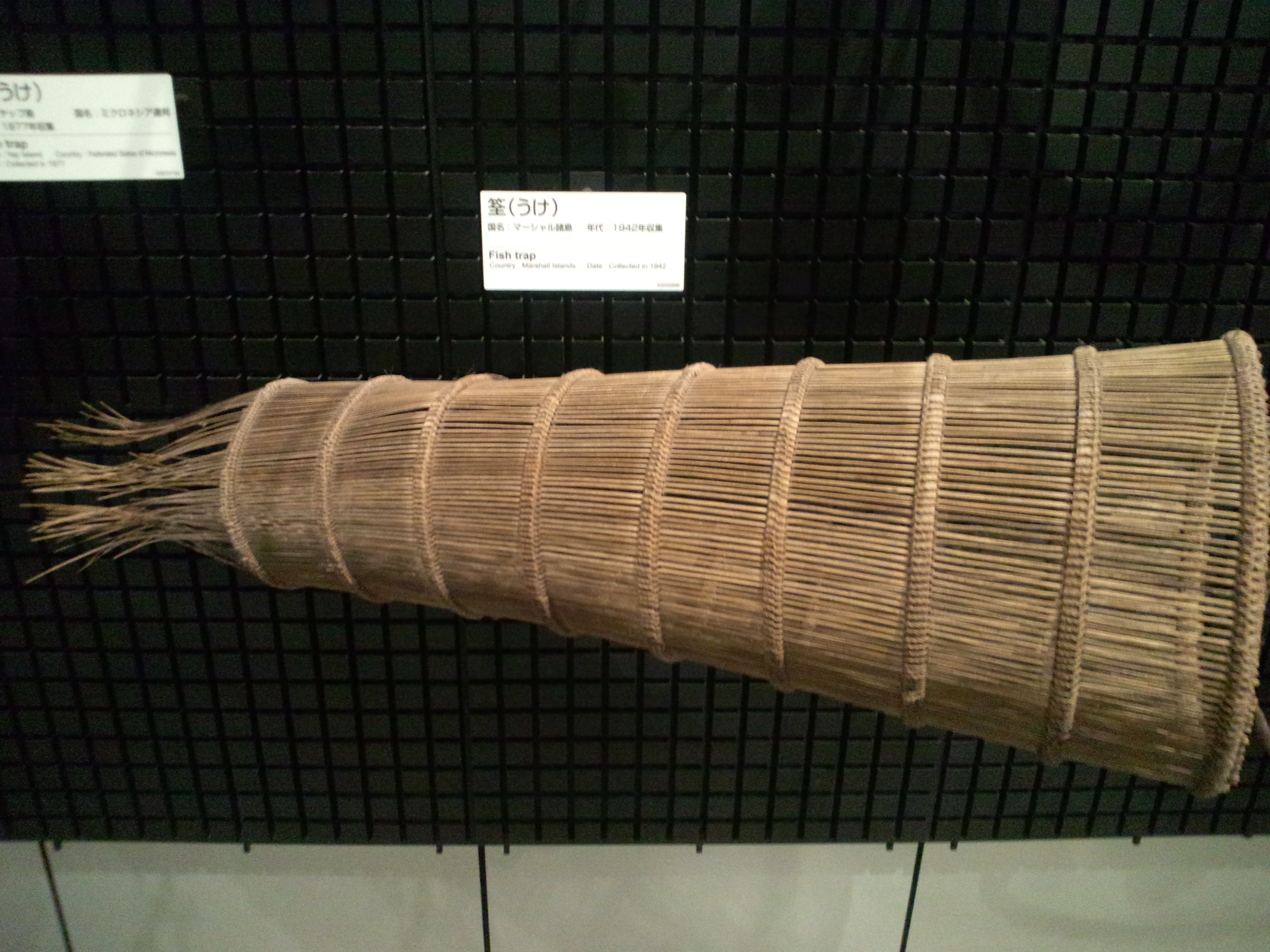
Marshall Islander fish trap, c. 1940s

The culture of the Marshall Islands forms part of the wider culture of Micronesia. It is marked by pre-Western contact and the impact of that contact on its people afterward. The Marshall Islands were relatively isolated. Inhabitants developed skilled navigators, able to navigate by the currents to other atolls. Prior to close contact with Westerners, children went naked and men and women were topless, wearing only skirts made of mats of native materials.

The land was and still remains the most important measure of a family's wealth. Land is inherited through the maternal line.

Since the arrival of Christian missionaries, the culture has shifted from a subsistence-based economy towards a more westernized economy and standard.

The people can be described as friendly and peaceful. Strangers are relatively received warmly. Consideration for others is important to the Marshallese people. Family and community are important. Concern for others is an outgrowth of their dependence on one another. They have lived for centuries on isolated coral atolls and islands. Relatives including grandparents, aunts, uncles, cousins and far-flung relatives are all considered close family. The strong family ties contribute to close-knit communities rooted in the values of caring, kindness and respect. One of the most significant family events is a child's first birthday.

The island culture was heavily impacted by the fight for Kwajalein Atoll during World War II and the United States nuclear testing program on Bikini Atoll from 1946 and 1958. Former residents and their descendants who were ousted after World War II receive compensation from the U.S. government. This dependence on aid has shifted residents' loyalty away from traditional chiefs. The island culture is heavily influenced today by the presence of about 2000 foreign personnel on the Ronald Reagan Ballistic Missile Defense Test Site, which includes rocket launch, test, and support facilities on eleven islands of the Kwajalein Atoll, along with Wake Island and Aur Atoll.

== Sports ==
Major sports played in the Marshall Islands include volleyball, basketball (primarily by men), baseball, football and a number of water sports. The Marshall Islands has been represented at the Olympics at all games since the 2008 Beijing Olympics. In the 2020 Tokyo Olympics, the Marshall Islands were represented by two swimmers. The Marshall Islands also competes in the Pacific Games every four years, winning five gold medals at the 2023 edition of the games, all in weightlifting.

=== Football ===
The Marshall Islands have a small club football league, including Kobeer as the most successful club. One tournament was held by Play Soccer Make Peace. The island of Majuro has a small football association. The Marshall Islands was the only country in the world that did not have its own national team. In 2020, the Marshall Islands Soccer Federation was founded by Shem Livai. On 14 August 2025, The Marshall Islands played their first international game against the US Virgin Islands losing 4-0 in Springdale, Arkansas during the 2025 Outrigger Challenge Cup .

=== Baseball and softball ===
Softball and baseball are held under one sports federation in the Marshall Islands. The President is Jeimata Nokko Kabua. Both sports are growing at a fast pace, with hundreds of Marshallese people behind the Marshall Islands Baseball / Softball Federation. The Marshall Islands achieved a silver medal in the Micronesian Games in 2012, as well as medals in the SPG Games.

== Economy ==
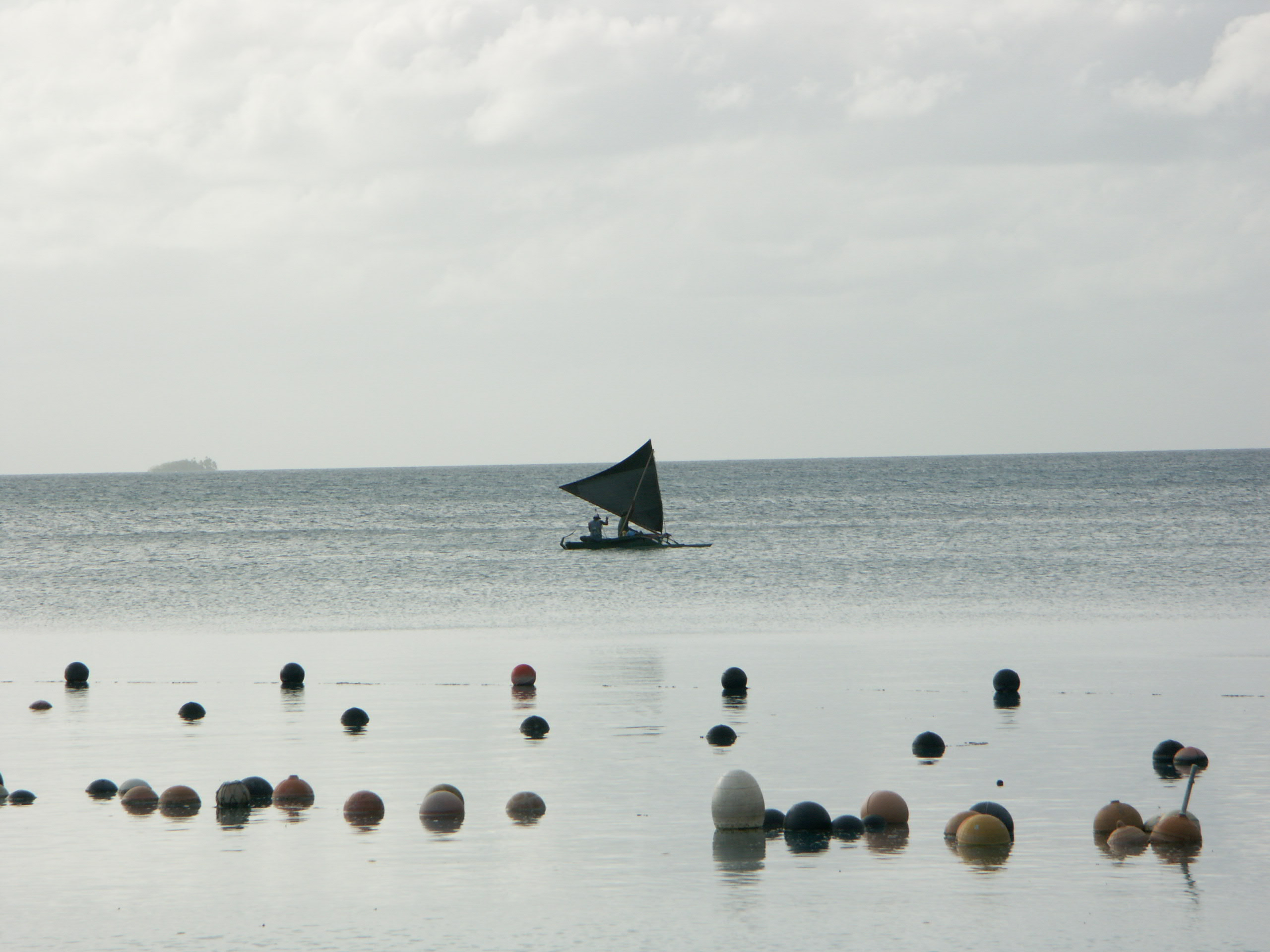
Sailboat in the Marshall Islands

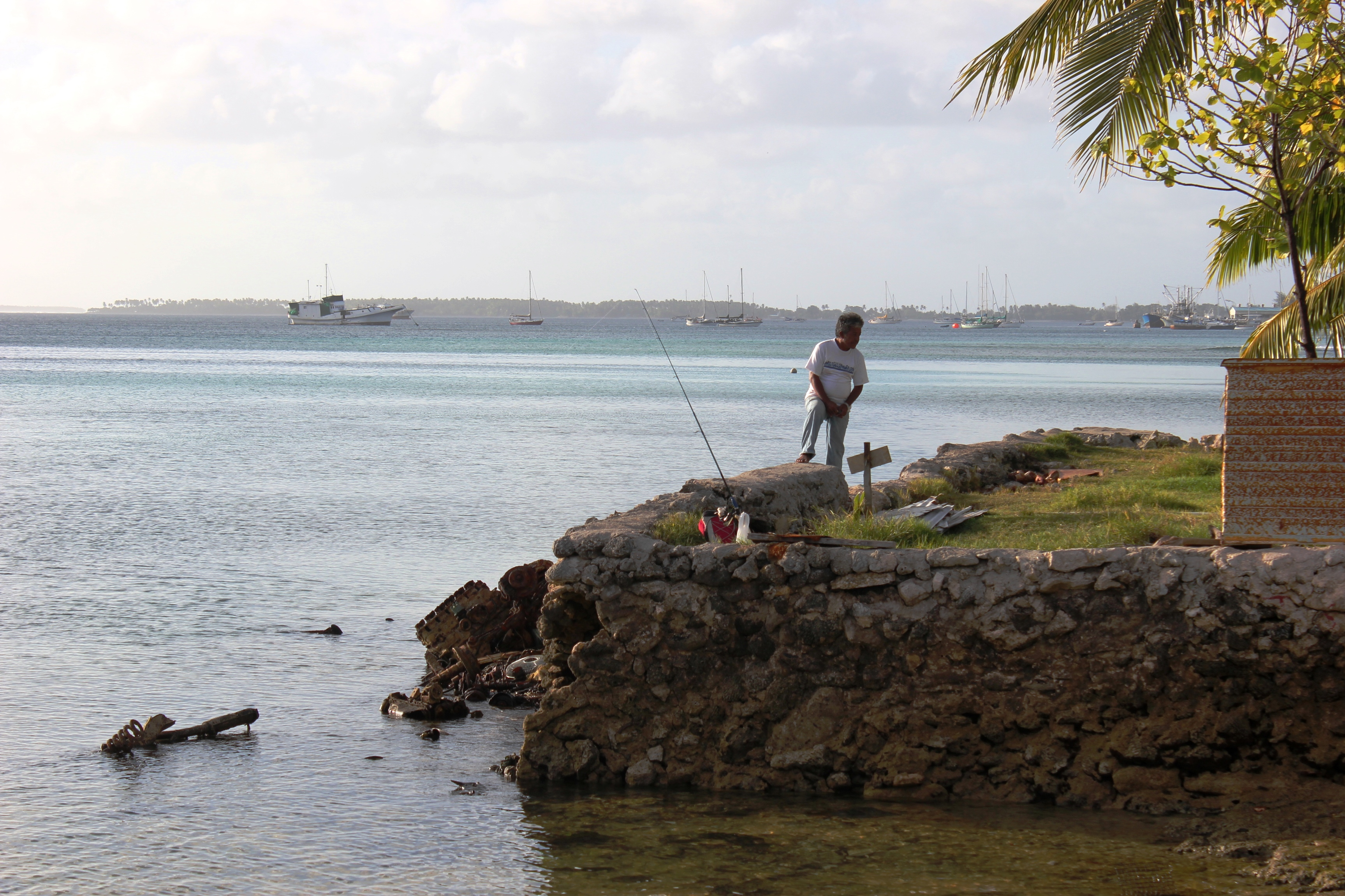
Fisherman on Majuro, 2012

The islands have few natural resources, and their imports far exceed exports. According to the CIA, the value of exports in 2013 was approximately $53.7 million while estimated imports were $133.7 million. Agricultural products include coconuts, tomatoes, melons, taro, breadfruit, fruits, pigs and chickens. Industry is made of the production of copra and craft items, tuna processing and tourism. The GDP in 2016 was an estimated $180 million, with a real growth rate of 1.7%. The GDP per capita was $3,300.

The International Monetary Fund reported in mid-2016 that the economy of the Republic had expanded by about 0.5 percent in the Fiscal Year 2015 thanks to an improved fisheries sector. A surplus of 3% of GDP was recorded "owing to record-high fishing license fees. Growth is expected to rise to about 1.5 percent and inflation to about 0.5 percent in FY2016, as the effects of the drought in earlier 2016 are offset by the resumption of infrastructure projects."

In 2018, the Republic of Marshall Islands passed the Sovereign Currency Act, which was later repealed in August 2025. This was intended to launch a sovereign cryptocurrency and certify it as legal tender.

Marshall Islands has signed a bilateral trade agreement with Taiwan in 2019, this agreement has been approved in 2023 and will take effect at a future date.

In November 2025, the Ministry of Finance announced ENRA, a universal basic income program, for disbursements of funds to citizens. Eligible citizens have the option of receiving their disbursement through direct deposits, mailed checks and, through a dedicated citizen digital wallet designed specifically for the Marshallese, called Lomalo (which translates to “shared waters” in English). Through Lomalo, qualified recipients can verify their eligibility status, receive benefits in real time, and manage their accounts. The Lomalo digital wallet will help overcome long-standing distribution barriers in the Neighboring Islands, where limited banking infrastructure has historically delayed government transfers.

A digital disbursement channel is made possible by integration with USDM1, the RMI's Digital Sovereign Bond - a U.S. dollar-denominated sovereign security fully collateralized by short-dated US Treasuries and redeemable at par in U.S. dollars. Because USDM1 is issued and recorded digitally, it enables secure, low-cost electronic distribution of benefits across the Marshall Islands, while all settlements remain in U.S. dollars through existing financial channels. USDM1 is a sovereign obligation of the Republic of the Marshall Islands, supported by the US treasuries held as collateral by a Qualified Custodian in the United States under New York law. The treasuries are purchased with proceeds from the issuance of each unit and maintained in a bankruptcy-remote reserve account. This structure mirrors the design of Brady bonds, through which more than $150 billion of sovereign debt has been issued globally over the past three decades. USDM1 is recorded in digital, book-entry form on the blockchain, enabling transparent, real-time settlement and verification while preserving the legal and prudential safeguards of traditional sovereign securities.

=== Shipping ===
The Marshall Islands plays a vital role in the international shipping industry as a flag of convenience for commercial vessels. The Marshallese registry began operations in 1990, and is managed through a joint venture with International Registries, Inc., a US-based corporation that has offices in major shipping centers worldwide. As of 2017, the Marshallese ship registry was the second largest in the world, after that of Panama.

Unlike some flag countries, there is no requirement that a Marshallese flag vessel be owned by a Marshallese individual or corporation. Following the 2015 seizure of the MV Maersk Tigris, the United States announced that its treaty obligation to defend the Marshall Islands did not extend to foreign-owned Marshallese flag vessels at sea.

As a result of ship-to-ship transfers by Marshallese flag tanker vessels, the Marshall Islands have statistically been one of the largest importers of crude oil from the United States, despite the fact that the islands have no oil refining capacity.

=== Labor ===
In 2007, the Marshall Islands joined the International Labour Organization, which means its labor laws will comply with international benchmarks. This may affect business conditions in the islands.

=== Taxation ===
The income tax has two brackets, with rates of 8% and 12%. The corporate tax is 3% of revenue.

=== Foreign assistance ===
United States government assistance is the mainstay of the economy. Under terms of the Amended Compact of Free Association, the U.S. is committed to providing US$57.7 million per year in assistance to the Marshall Islands (RMI) through 2013 and then US$62.7 million through 2023, at which time a trust fund, made up of U.S. and RMI contributions, will begin perpetual annual payouts.

The United States Army maintains the Ronald Reagan Ballistic Missile Defense Test Site on Kwajalein Atoll. Marshallese landowners receive rent for the base.

=== Agriculture ===
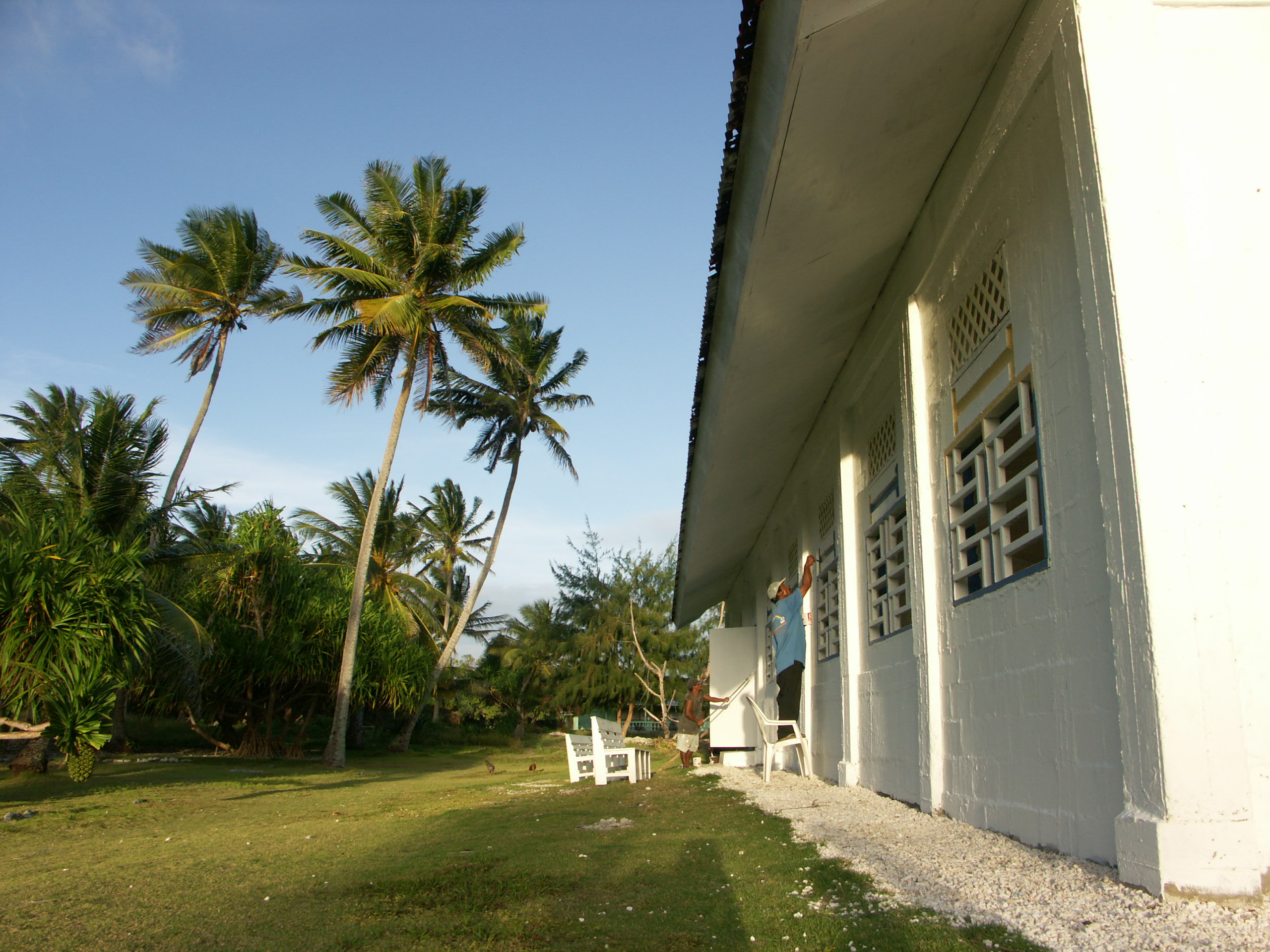
Coconut palms in the Marshall Islands

Agricultural production is concentrated on small farms. The most important commercial crop is copra, followed by coconut, breadfruit, pandanus, banana, taro and arrowroot. The livestock consists primarily of pigs and chickens.

=== Industry ===
Small-scale industry is limited to handicrafts, fish processing, and copra.

=== Fishing ===
Majuro is the world's busiest tuna transshipment port, with 704 transshipments totaling 444,393 tons in 2015. Majuro is also a tuna processing center; the Pan Pacific Foods plant exports processed tuna to a number of countries, primarily the United States under the Bumble Bee brand. Fishing license fees, primarily for tuna, provide noteworthy income for the government.

In 1999, a private company built a tuna loining plant with more than 400 employees, mostly women. But the plant closed in 2005 after a failed attempt to convert it to produce tuna steaks, a process that requires half as many employees. Operating costs exceeded revenue and the plant closed. It was taken over by the government, which had been the guarantor of a $2 million loan to the business.

=== Energy ===
Coconut trees abound in the Pacific's tropical islands. Copra, the meat of the coconut, yields 1 liter of coconut oil for every 6 to 10 coconuts. As of 2007 power authorities, private companies, and entrepreneurs on the islands had been experimenting with coconut oil as alternative to diesel fuel for vehicles, power generators, and ships. In 2009, a 57 kW solar power plant was installed, the largest in the Pacific at the time, including New Zealand. It is estimated that 330 kW of solar and 450 kW of wind power would be required to make the College of the Marshall Islands energy self-sufficient. Marshalls Energy Company (MEC), a government entity, provides the islands with electricity. In 2008, two 100-W_{p} solar home systems were installed on 420 homes on Ailinglaplap Atoll, sufficient for limited electricity use.

== Education ==
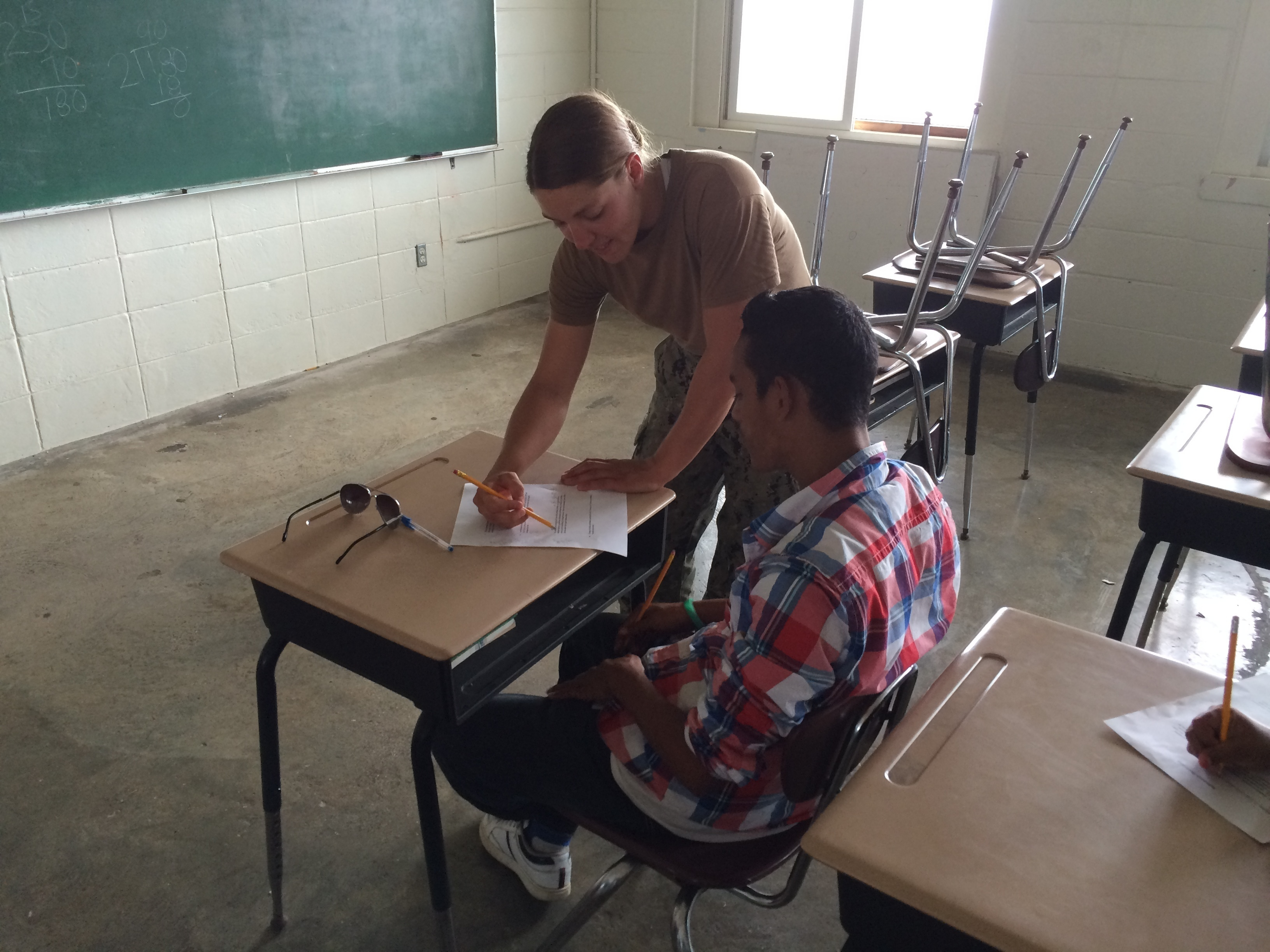
Navy sailor volunteer aids an Ebeye student with a mathematics problem at school.

The Human Rights Measurement Initiative (HRMI) finds that the Marshall Islands are fulfilling only 66.1% of what it should be fulfilling for the right to education based on the country's level of income. HRMI breaks down the right to education by looking at the rights to both primary education and secondary education. While taking into consideration the Marshall Islands' income level, the nation is achieving 65.5% of what should be possible based on its resources (income) for primary education and 66.6% for secondary education.

The Ministry of Education is the education agency of the islands. Marshall Islands Public School System operates the state schools in the Marshall Islands.

In the 1994–1995 school year the country had 103 elementary schools and 13 secondary schools. There were 27 private elementary schools and one private high school. Christian groups operated most of the private schools.

Historically the Marshallese population was taught in English first with Marshallese instruction coming later, but this was reversed in the 1990s to keep the islands' cultural heritage and so children could write in Marshallese. Now English language instruction begins in grade 3. Christine McMurray and Roy Smith wrote in Diseases of Globalization: Socioeconomic Transition and Health that this could potentially weaken the children's English skills.

There are two tertiary institutions operating in the Marshall Islands, the College of the Marshall Islands and the University of the South Pacific.

== Transportation ==
The Marshall Islands are served by the Marshall Islands International Airport in Majuro, the Bucholz Army Airfield in Kwajalein, and other small airports and airstrips. Airlines serving the country include United Airlines, Nauru Airlines, Air Marshall Islands, and Asia Pacific Airlines.

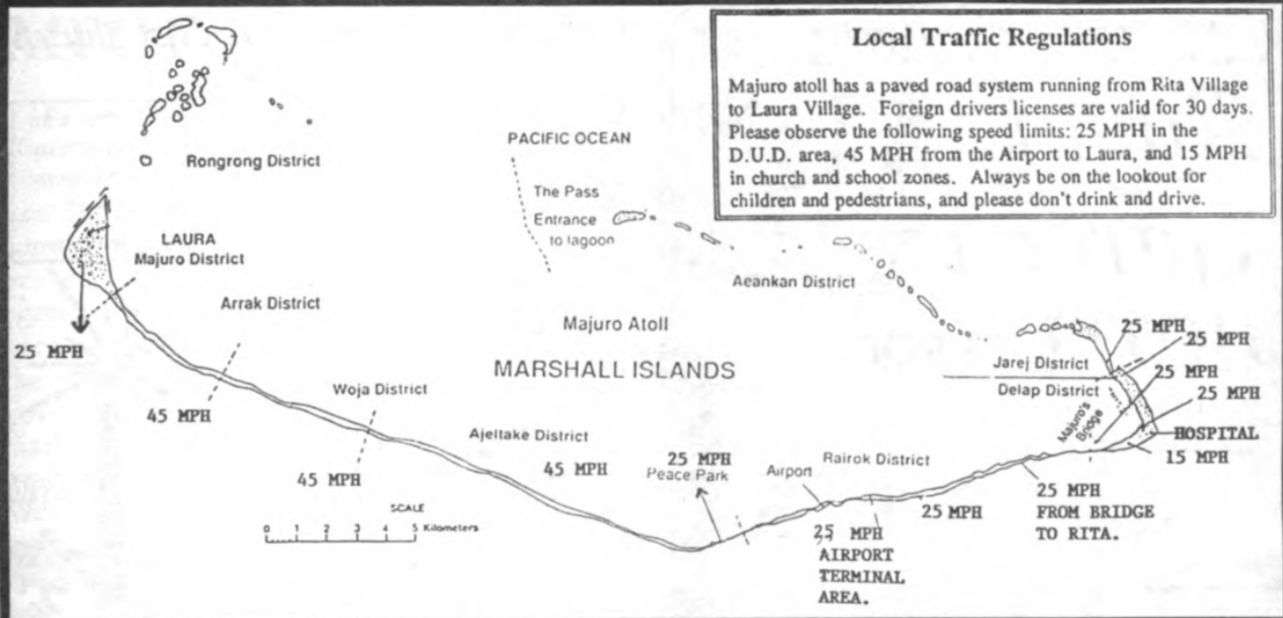
Road system on Majuro Atoll

== Media and communications ==
The Marshall Islands have several AM and FM radio stations. AM stations are 1098 5 kW V7AB Majuro (Radio Marshalls, national coverage) and 1224 AFN Kwajalein (both public radio) as well as 1557 Micronesia Heatwave. The FM stations are 97.9 V7AD Majuro, V7AA 96.3 FM Uliga and 104.1 V7AA Majuro (Baptist religious). BBC World is broadcast on 98.5 FM Majuro. The most recent station is Power 103.5 which started broadcasting in 2016.

AFRTS stations include 99.9 AFN Kwajalein (country), 101.1 AFN (adult rock) and 102.1 AFN (hot AC).

There is one broadcast television station, MBC-TV operated by the state. Cable TV is available. On cable TV, most programs are shown two weeks later than in North America but news in real time can be viewed on CNN, CNBC and BBC. American Forces Radio and Television also provides TV service to Kwajalein Atoll.

The Marshall Islands National Telecommunications Authority (NTA) provides telephone, cable TV (MHTV), FAX, cellular and Internet services. The Authority is a private corporation with significant ownership by the national government.

=== Newspapers ===
Loan Ran Kein, a Marshallese language paper, was published from 1953 to 1954. The current national newspaper is a bilingual (Marshallese and English) weekly, The Marshall Islands Journal. It has been published since 1980.

== See also ==
- Outline of the Marshall Islands
- Index of Marshall Islands–related articles
- List of islands of the Marshall Islands
- Pacific Proving Grounds
- List of island countries
- The Plutonium Files
- Visa policy of the Marshall Islands
- Naval Base Marshall Islands

== Bibliography ==
- Finney, Ben (1998). "13: Nautical Cartography and Traditional Navigation in Oceania" (PDF). In Woodward, David; Lewis, G. Malcolm (eds.). The History of Cartography. Vol. 2.3: Cartography in the Traditional African, American, Arctic, Australian, and Pacific Societies. Chicago: University of Chicago Press. pp. 443–492. ISBN 9780226907284. Archived (PDF) from the original on October 4, 2021.
- Firth, Stewart (1973). "German Firms in the Western Pacific Islands, 1857-1914". The Journal of Pacific History. 8. Taylor & Francis: 10–28. doi:10.1080/00223347308572220. JSTOR 25168133.
- Firth, Stewart (1978). "German Labour Policy in Nauru and Angaur, 1906–1914". The Journal of Pacific History. 13 (1): 36–52. doi:10.1080/00223347808572337. JSTOR 25168311.
- Fitzpatrick, Matthew P. (2022). "11: The Kaiser's Birthday Present". The Kaiser and the Colonies: Monarchy in the Age of Empire. Oxford: Oxford University Press. doi:10.1093/oso/9780192897039.003.0012. ISBN 9780192897039. Archived from the original on August 8, 2023.
- Fortune, Kate (2000). "The Marshall Islands". In Lai, Brij V.; Fortune, Kate (eds.). The Pacific Islands: An Encyclopedia. University of Hawaii Press. pp. 586–588. ISBN 9780824822651.
- Hiery, Hermann (1995). The Neglected War: The German South Pacific and the Influence of World War I. Honolulu: University of Hawaii Press. ISBN 9780824816681.
- Hezel, Francis X. (1983). The First Taint of Civilization: A History of the Caroline and Marshall Islands in Pre-colonial Days, 1521–1885. Pacific Islands Monograph Series. Honolulu: University of Hawaii Press. ISBN 9780824816438.
- Hezel, Francis X. (2003). Strangers in Their Own Land: A Century of Colonial Rule in the Caroline and Marshall Islands. Pacific Islands Monograph Series. Honolulu: University of Hawaii Press. ISBN 9780824828042.
- Kirch, P. V.; Weisler, M. I. (1994). "Archaeology in the Pacific Islands: An Appraisal of Recent Research". Journal of Archaeological Research. 2 (4): 285–328. doi:10.1007/BF02231482. JSTOR 41053094. S2CID 144401071.
- Peattie, Mark R. (1984). "Chapter 4: The Nan'yō: Japan in the South Pacific, 1885–1945". In Myers, Ramon H.; Peattie, Mark R. (eds.). The Japanese Colonial Empire, 1895-1945. Princeton University Press. doi:10.2307/j.ctv10crf6c. ISBN 9780691102221. JSTOR j.ctv10crf6c.
- Peattie, Mark R. (1992). Nan'yō: The Rise and Fall of the Japanese in Micronesia, 1885–1945. Pacific Islands Monograph Series. Honolulu: University of Hawaii Press. ISBN 9780824814809.
- Purcell, David C. (1976). "The Economics of Exploitation: The Japanese in the Mariana, Caroline and Marshall Islands, 1915-1940". The Journal of Pacific History. 11 (3): 189–211. doi:10.1080/00223347608572301. JSTOR 25168262.
- Reséndez, Andrés (2021). Conquering the Pacific: An Unknown Mariner and the Final Great Voyage of the Age of Discovery. Boston: Houghton Mifflin Harcourt. ISBN 9781328515971.
- Sharp, Andrew (1960). The Discovery of the Pacific Islands. London: Oxford University Press. ISBN 9780198215196.
- Storr, Cait (2020). International Status in the Shadow of Empire: Nauru and the Histories of International Law. Cambridge Studies in International and Comparative Law. Cambridge: Cambridge University Press. doi:10.1017/9781108682602. ISBN 9781108682602. S2CID 225252547.
- Streck, Charles F. (1990). "Prehistoric Settlement in Eastern Micronesia: Archaeology on Bikini Atoll, Republic of the Marshall Islands" (PDF). Micronesica. Suppl. 2: 247–260. Archived (PDF) from the original on August 4, 2023.
- Weisler, Marshall I. (2000). "Burial Artifacts from the Marshall Islands: Description, Dating and Evidence for Extra-archipelago Contacts" (PDF). Micronesica. 33 (1/2): 111–136. Archived (PDF) from the original on December 3, 2023.
