= Providence Island =

Providence Island may refer to:

- Providencia Island, part of the Archipelago of San Andres, Providencia and Santa Catalina in Colombia, which was settled by the Providence Island Company
- Providence Island colony, the English settlement on this island
- Providence Island, Seychelles in Providence Atoll in Seychelles
- Ujelang Atoll, which the captain of the British merchant vessel Providence rediscovered in 1811 and named after his vessel
- Providence Island, one of the roughly 80 islands of Lake Champlain in North America
- Providence Island, Liberia is the island on coast of Liberia where American freedmen first colonized.
