= O'Hegarty =

O'Hegarty is a surname. Notable people with the surname include:

- Diarmuid O'Hegarty (1892-1958), Irish civil servant and revolutionary
- P. S. O'Hegarty (1879-1955), Irish writer and editor
- Seán O'Hegarty (1881-1963), Irish Republican Army member
