= Daniel O'Donovan (Irish republican) =

Irish republican

Daniel "Sandow" O'Donovan (1890, in Cork (city) – 31 July 1975, in Mallow, County Cork, Ireland), was a leading member of the Irish Republican Army during the Irish War of Independence.

== Early life ==
Dan O'Donovan was an early recruit to the Irish Volunteers and paraded with the Cork Volunteers at the funeral of Jeremiah O'Donovan Rossa at Glasnevin Cemetery, Dublin, in 1915, at which Patrick Pearse gave his famous oration ending with "Ireland unfree shall never be at peace".

== War of Independence ==
He was later a prominent officer of Cork's No. 1 Brigade of the Irish Republican Army during the Irish War of Independence. On 3 September 1917 he led a successful raid for arms at Cork Grammar School, a school for the children of the Anglo-Irish gentry, which maintained its own armoury for training potential British Army officers. O'Donovan acquired the nickname "Sandow" around this time because of his resemblance to famous German bodybuilder Eugen Sandow.

O'Donovan led or participated in many daring raids against British forces in County Cork, including the capture of Blarney's Royal Irish Constabulary barracks on 1 June 1920. O'Donovan was also in command of the six-man IRA unit that carried out the assassination of RIC District Inspector Gerald Bryce Ferguson Smyth at the Cork and County social club on the evening of 17 July 1920. Some weeks earlier Smyth had gained notoriety when RIC Constables in Listowel, County Kerry mutinied rather than listen to his orders to "shoot to kill" all persons who were suspected of Irish republicanism. For this reason, O'Donovan is alleged to have called out before the hit team opened fire, "Colonel, were not your orders to shoot on sight? Well you are in sight now, so prepare." According to historians Tom Mahon and James Gillogly, "Smyth was the most senior police officer killed in the conflict."

Under the command of Seán O'Hegarty, O'Donovan and others organised the Coolavokig Ambush near Macroom in February 1921. He was also involved in the seizure of a large cache of guns and ammunition from the British Royal Navy tender, Upnor, off the coast of County Cork, after first commandeering a smaller vessel at Queenstown. According to historians Tom Mahon and James Gillogly, "The IRA operatives seized so much arms and ammunition that they're reported to have needed 200 lorries to cart it all away."

== Civil War ==
After the signing of the Anglo-Irish Treaty of 1921, O'Donovan took the anti-treaty side in the Irish Civil War. He was involved in an attack on Royal Navy personnel at the Treaty Port at Spike Island, County Cork, this time using IRA men dressed in Irish Army uniforms in an attempt to start a war between the Irish Free State and the British Empire. Both Governments, however, realized almost immediately who had really carried out the attack. As a result, a reward of £10,000 was offered for information leading to the capture of O'Donovan and five other named republicans.

On 22 August 1922, O'Donovan chaired a meeting of surviving IRA officers in Long's Bar (The Diamond), Béal na Bláth, County Cork. Present were senior national figures including Liam Deasy, Tom Barry and Éamon de Valera. Later the same day General Michael Collins, Commander-in-Chief of the Irish Army and Chairman of the Provisional Government of the Irish Free State was killed by a sniper in an ambush a half mile away.

== Post-war years ==
During the aftermath of the Civil War, in return for badly needed funding, the IRA's intelligence arm covertly acquired classified information in both Great Britain and the United States of America, which was then sold to the Soviet Union. The IRA's main spymaster in America during this era was based in New York City and is referred to only as "Mr. Jones" in recently decrypted IRA messages from the era. After careful research, historians Tom Mahon and James J. Gillogly have identified "Mr. Jones" as O'Donovan. According to both historians, while living in America, O'Donovan covertly acquired and sold to the Soviet Union's military intelligence service, the GRU, "reports of the army’s chemical weapons service, state-of-the-art gas masks, machine-gun and aeroplane engine specifications, and reports from the navy, air service and army".

Also according to Mahon and Gillogly, "Mr. Jones" was also involved in efforts to acquire the ability to build chemical weapons for both the GRU and for the IRA, which hoped to use mustard gas against the military and police forces of the Irish Free State. The Soviet Union was more successful than the IRA in using O'Donovan's information to manufacture chemical weapons and Red Army Marshal of the Soviet Union Mikhail Tukhachevsky was a pioneer in the use of poison gas against peasant uprisings. Despite this, historians Tom Mahon and James J. Gillogly have praised O'Donovan as, "A true Irish James Bond!"

In later years O'Donovan worked with the Irish Sugar Company in North Cork where he managed Ballybeg Quarry, near Buttevant, which the company owned.

Dan "Sandow" O'Donovan died in 1975 and was interred in a family plot at St. Finbarr's Cemetery, Cork City.

O'Donovan is often erroneously referred in history books of the period as "Donovan".
