= Lope Martín =

Portuguese maritime pilot (marooned 1566)

- Born: Lagos, Portugal
- Disappeared: 21 July 1566; Ujelang Atoll
- Occupation: Maritime pilot
- Known for: First to complete the west–east voyage across the Pacific
- Criminal charges: Desertion; mutiny; embezzlement

Lope Martín (fl. 1564–1566) was a Portuguese maritime pilot who successfully navigated across the Pacific Ocean east–west and then west–east, becoming the first to complete the return voyage from Asia to the Americas. Martín was from Lagos, Portugal, and became a licensed pilot in Spain. He was contracted for Miguel López de Legazpi's expedition from Mexico to the Philippines and was designated the sole pilot of a patache called the San Lucas. Martín and the San Lucas separated from the rest of the fleet after ten days and sailed through the Marshall Islands and the Caroline Islands before arriving at the Philippines in January 1565. Without the rest of the fleet, Martín then embarked upon the return voyage from Asia to the Americas, which had been attempted but never completed; the San Lucas arrived in Mexico in August 1565.

In spite of Martín's accomplishments, the Real Audiencia of Mexico soon ordered him to return to the Philippines and appear before Legazpi, who was expected to execute him for having allegedly deserted the rest of his fleet. Martín's ship, the San Jerónimo, departed Mexico in May 1566; recognizing the danger that he faced, Martín led two successive mutinies and took command of the ship. He anchored the San Jerónimo at Ujelang Atoll in July 1566, intending to maroon any members of the crew who were not loyal to him; instead, Martín and 26 other men were left behind and never seen again.

== Early life ==
Martín was born in Lagos, Portugal. He was a free mulatto of Portuguese and African descent whose African ancestors were brought to Portugal as slaves. He was a skilled sailor and navigator; he was a licensed maritime pilot in Spain, a position that required much navigational and technical expertise. He was also one of the very few pilots of African descent in Spain in that era. Pilots were expected to be Spanish nationals; Martín probably claimed to be from the town of Ayamonte, near the Spanish and Portuguese border, since many of his contemporaries wrongly believed him to be from the town. Martín also stated that he had a wife living in the town.

== Legazpi expedition ==
In 1557, King Philip II of Spain ordered Luis de Velasco, the viceroy of New Spain, to send a fleet to the East Indies and establish a colony there. At the port of Navidad (now the town of Barra de Navidad, Mexico), four ships were constructed for the expedition and 380 men, including sailors, soldiers, scribes, and friars, were gathered to crew them. Martín was one of six pilots contracted for the expedition. He was to receive a payment of 700 ducats for the voyage, 300 fewer than the lead pilot Esteban Rodríguez; for reference, a laborer's yearly wage around that time was roughly 30 to 40 ducats.

Martín was designated the sole pilot of one of the four ships, the San Lucas, a three-masted patache (a small ship with shallow sides). The smallest of the four, the San Lucas was 40 tons and around 29 feet (8.8 m) long. It had a crew of ten sailors and ten soldiers and carried just eight barrels containing around 1,000 gallons (3,600 L) of water, even though the vessel would need to travel roughly 8,000 miles (13,000 km) to its eventual destination, the Philippines. In comparison, the fleet's flagship, the San Pedro, was 550 tons (roughly five times larger than Ferdinand Magellan's ship, Trinidad) and carried 200 barrels of water, 100 soldiers, two pilots, three friars, and all of the expedition's leadership. When the San Lucas's original captain, Hernán Sánchez Muñón, refused to travel to Navidad, the fleet commander Miguel López de Legazpi appointed the nobleman Alonso de Arellano in his stead. Arellano did not have any nautical training.

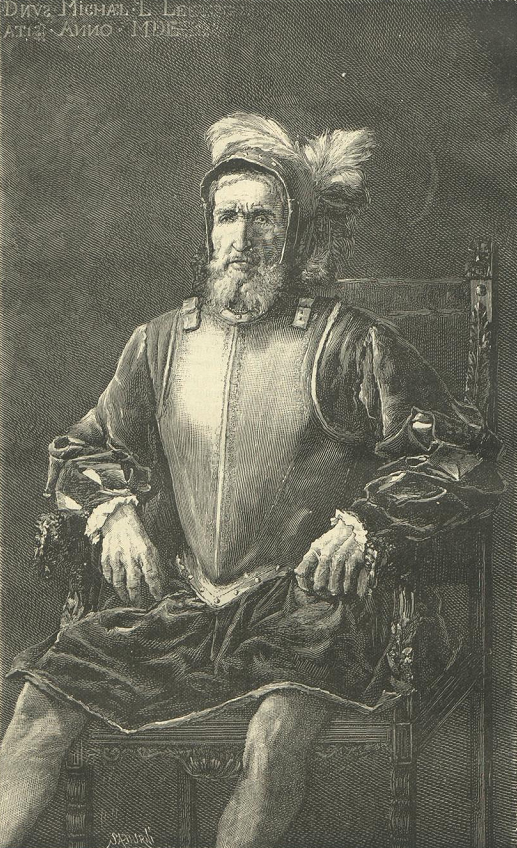
Legazpi

Following years of preparation and multiple delays, the four ships departed Navidad in the early morning of 21 November 1564 with Legazpi as their commander and the experienced sailor Andrés de Urdaneta as his advisor. Four days into the voyage, Legazpi called for a meeting on the San Pedro. During the meeting, which was attended by the fleet's highest-ranking officers and pilots including Lope Martín, Legazpi revealed that although the fleet had previously received instructions to travel to New Guinea, the Real Audiencia of Mexico, Mexico's high court, covertly ordered Legazpi to instead direct the fleet to the Philippines and establish a colony on the islands. The Audiencia had also ordered him to keep these instructions secret until the fleet had already departed and sailed 100 leagues (Note: Although not always consistent, a Spanish league was generally equivalent to anywhere from 4.19 kilometres (2.26 nmi) to 6.35 kilometres (3.43 nmi).) from the port, as Spanish colonization of the Philippines would be an open violation of the Treaty of Tordesillas and the Treaty of Zaragoza. According to the treaties, the Philippines belonged entirely to Portugal.

Martín's navigational equipment during the voyage included a compass, a table showing the Sun's declination, and a now-lost chart of the North Pacific. He was also capable of calculating longitude by finding the difference between magnetic north and true north, called magnetic declination. At this time, such a skill was rare among pilots. For parts of the journey, Martín had sailed without any reference, and some of his estimates and measurements are known to be inaccurate; it is therefore impossible to plot the San Lucas's exact course.

=== Separation and voyage to the Philippines ===
After the meeting, Legazpi ordered the San Lucas to take the San Pedro's position at the front of the fleet, where its crew would be responsible for scouting for hazards. They also established a signal system that used flags during the day and lanterns in the dark. As the San Lucas began to stray further from the fleet, at some points separating itself by two leagues, Legazpi ordered Martín to maintain his ship within half a league from the rest of the vessels. On 1 December 1564, a tempest formed, and Arellano ordered the crew to hang lanterns on the mainmast and stern. The flagship signaled to the rest of the ships to slow down, but Martín explained to Arellano that the San Lucas could not reduce its speed during the storm without its deck flooding due to the vessel's shallow sides. Thus, despite the signal and Legazpi's orders to remain within half a league, the San Lucas continued forward and disappeared from the view of the rest of the squadron.

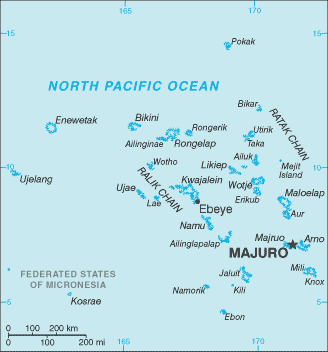
The Marshall Islands

Separated, the San Lucas spent over a month on the open ocean before encountering the Marshall Islands. The islands, which comprise 29 atolls and 5 coral islands, pose a threat because they are surrounded by coral that can breach a vessel's hull. They are low-lying, making them difficult to detect during approach. It is also difficult to anchor at an atoll due to both the risk of breaching and the great depth of the ocean surrounding them. On the night of 5 January 1565, crewmembers of the San Lucas recognized that the ship was headed directly towards one of the Marshall Islands' atolls (possibly Likiep) after they heard crashing waves. Martín quickly ordered the sails lowered as the San Lucas's helmsman turned the vessel hard to port. Pushed by a strong breeze, the ship narrowly avoided crashing into the atoll and instead entered a shallow body of water. While standing on the deck and searching for a way to reenter the open sea, Martín was swept off of the ship by a wave. He managed to cling onto a rope with a single hand and reboard the vessel.

Two days after avoiding the atoll, the San Lucas's crew spotted a canoe piloted by three inhabitants of the islands. The sailors helped the three natives, two grown men and one boy, board the ship and gave them beads, a knife, toy bells, and a shirt in exchange for fish, coconuts, and water. The natives then led ten of the crewmembers—among them Martín and Arellano—to their families and their homes, which they had built on the shoreline of an island amid the coral reefs (possibly Kwajalein Atoll). Martín called the island "the Island of the Two Neighbors", referring to the two families that lived there.

The following day, 8 January, the sailors of the San Lucas encountered a well-populated island whose inhabitants swam out more than one league to meet the vessel; Arellano named it "the Island of the Swimmers". Before the voyage, Legazpi had developed a contingency plan in the event a ship split from the rest of the fleet: the ship was to wait at the next island for ten days and wait for the others; if it recorded no sight of the others or failed to find land, the crew was to leave a cross and a letter explaining where they would go before proceeding. According to Arellano, the San Lucas failed to stop at any point in the Marshall Islands because they could not find anchorage in the coral reefs.

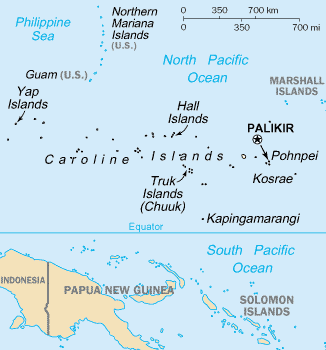
The Caroline Islands

Having successfully navigated through the Marshall Islands, the San Lucas proceeded to the Caroline Islands, barely avoiding a reef on 15 January and arriving on 17 January at what was most likely Chuuk Lagoon. After the inhabitants of Chuuk invited the San Lucas to sail into an inlet within the atoll, they launched an assault on the vessel with spears and clubs. The sailors attempted to withdraw as Arellano ordered a musket volley to frighten the natives away. Martín considered that in the dark it would be impossible to exit the atoll by the same route they had entered; he instead marked the bearing of a nearby shoal for reference and had the leadsman search for anchorage. As the ship moved slowly along the shoal, the leadsman located a bottom at thirty fathoms, and the San Lucas managed to anchor for the night. They departed Chuuk the following morning, and although about a dozen canoes followed them, a sailor scared them off with a shot from a culverin, a medieval-era light cannon.

The next day, the San Lucas anchored at Pulap Atoll, in desperate need of wood and water. After a sailor sailed to and from the atoll on one of the inhabitant's canoes, returning with jars of water, Martín and Arellano planned to row to the island with eight other men. They departed in their boat, but worried that the reef would tear a hole in the bottom and disconcerted by the sight of islanders hiding behind trees holding spears, Martín and Arellano reversed course and returned to the San Lucas. Instead, three more sailors boarded canoes and went towards the island, where the natives clubbed the first two to death. The third managed to fight off the natives who were bringing him to the island and was rescued by his crewmates. The San Lucas departed with its crew reduced to just eight sailors and ten soldiers.

On 22 January, the San Lucas coasted near an atoll—probably Sorol—when two canoes met them out at sea. Martín threw a red jacket into the water for the natives; as they drew near, a soldier seized a boy from the canoe by the hair and dragged him onto the ship while the rest fired muskets and a culverin at both canoes. The wounded men abandoned their canoes and swam back to the island. The crew of the San Lucas captured the canoes and broke them down for firewood. As for the boy, the crew cut his hair, clothed him, and named him Vicente. They passed by another atoll, likely Ngulu, the following night.

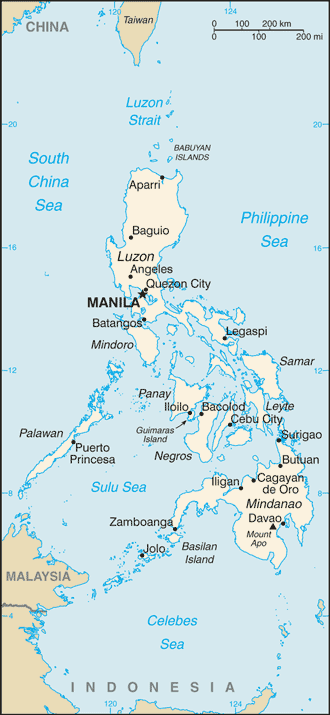
The Philippines

Martín and the crew of the San Lucas were the first of the fleet to reach the Philippines, spotting the islands on 29 January, seventy days after departing from Mexico. That evening, the wind changed and began to push them towards the shore. Threatened with the ship's grounding, the crew lowered the rowboat, aiming to use it to tow the ship out of danger; instead, the wind hurled the boat into the ship, damaging both craft. By 02:00 the next morning, the crew had accepted that the San Lucas would run aground, which it did, and began preparing to unload the ship. Then the wind shifted once more, freeing the ship. Martín suggested to Arellano that, like Ruy López de Villalobos who had led an expedition to the Philippines two decades earlier, they would be unable to sail north along Mindanao due to a current; accordingly, it would be better to travel south to the Davao Gulf. Arellano agreed and the San Lucas cruised to the gulf, where its crew brought it to rest in a sheltered cove near modern-day Surigao.

On the morning of 30 January, Martín and four sailors rowed to shore to meet with three Filipinos who had called out to them. The Filipinos left and returned that afternoon with thirty or forty warriors. Arellano and Martín rowed back to the island to reconvene with them; together, the groups embraced and drank alcohol. The San Lucas remained anchored in the cove for the entirety of February. A minor mutiny began there as four discontented men absconded with the ship's rowboat, a flint stone, and some arquebuses (a type of long gun), and made a camp on the island. Tied to the ship with rope, Martín swam as close as he could to the shore and appealed to the men, but still they refused to return. One night, Martín led Arellano and three men to the mutineers' camp, where he shot their lookout with an arquebus while the rest of the men apprehended the sleeping campers. Arellano brought all four mutineers to the ship and arranged their execution, but just before the men could be hanged, Martín intervened and claimed they would be unable to depart with such a diminished crew. Arellano relented, allowing them to rejoin the crew and planning to allow Legazpi to punish them when the San Lucas rejoined the main fleet.

=== Return voyage ===
Repaired, the San Lucas left the cove on 4 March and continued west around Mindanao, their departure apparently motivated by an impending Filipino attack. Before they left, the men of the San Lucas had left crosses and a jar of letters detailing their path, hoping the rest of the fleet would find them. They cruised around the center of the Philippines and passed the islands of Mindanao, Cebu, Bohol, and Leyte with the intent of locating Legazpi and the fleet, but did not find them. Martín deftly piloted the ship around a shoal and through the San Bernardino Strait, reentering the open ocean on 21 April. Advising Arellano, Martín recommended that they sail northeast back to Mexico, avoiding the Portuguese Spice Islands, and they set out to do so the following day. Before them, Magellan, Loaísa, Álvaro de Saavedra, and López de Villalobos had all attempted to sail the Pacific west to east to America; each had failed.

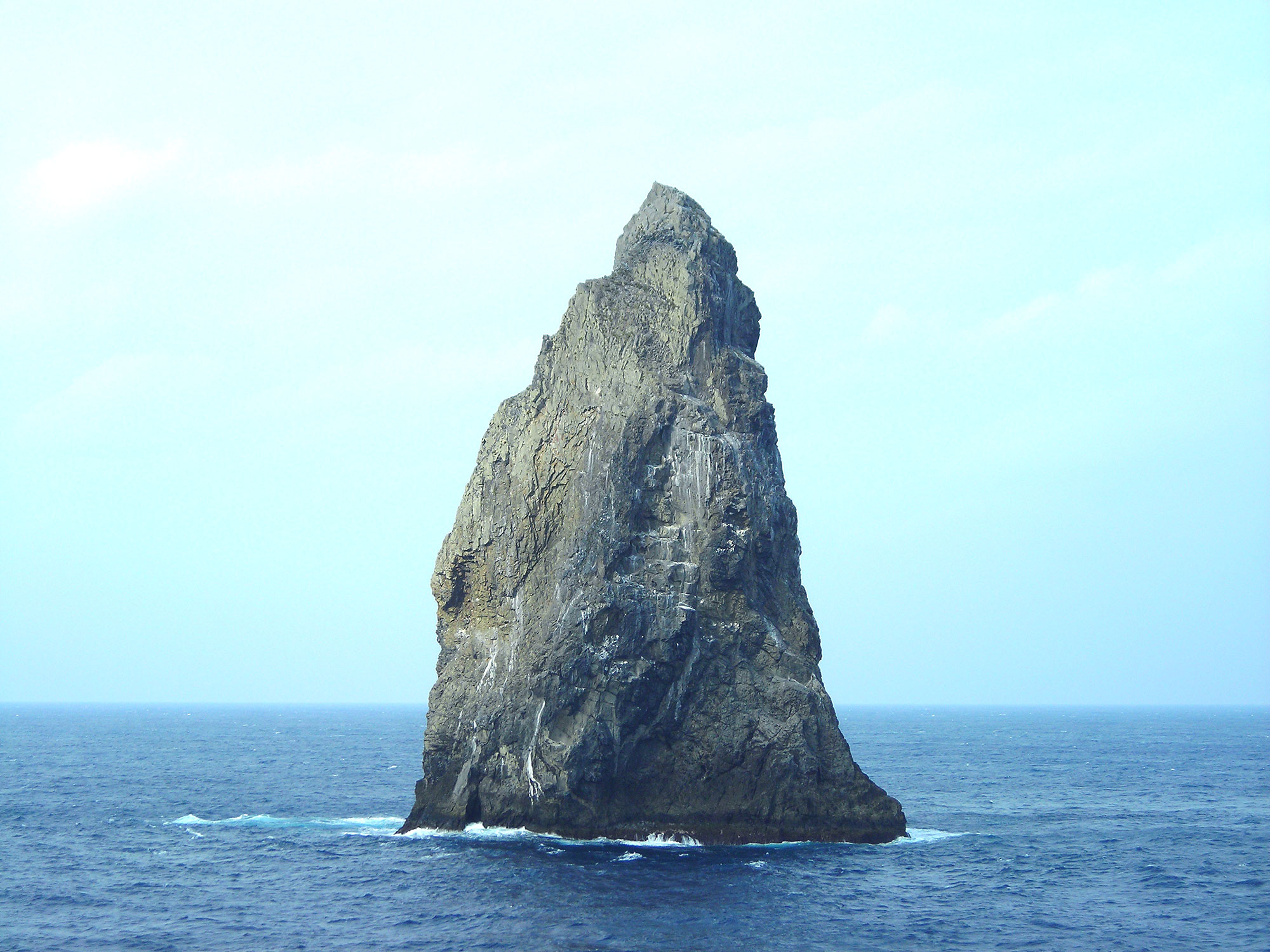
Lot's Wife

Martín intended to first navigate to Japan and stop for supplies before attempting the crossing, but the San Lucas never landed in Japan due to a misleading map. In fact, the only land the crew would see between the Philippines and North America was Lot's Wife, 400 miles (640 km) south of Tokyo. The San Lucas continued north past the 43rd parallel until Martín, worried that they were close enough to China to run aground, directed the ship to the east. By that time, they were so far north that on 11 June, snow fell on the ship and their lamp oil froze; no European had traveled as far north in the Pacific before them. During the journey, the ship's men developed scurvy and were forced to use their own clothing to patch the sails. They also had to deal with rats gnawing into their casks of water and spilling their contents; the rodents were so numerous that according to Arellano, the crew "killed between twenty and thirty every night". At one point in the journey, to combat insubordination among the crew, Arellano and Martín had two men thrown overboard.

After changing to a more southeasterly course, the crew of the San Lucas spotted North America for the first time on 16 July; Martín surmised that they were seeing Cedros Island off the coast of Baja California. On 28 July, just a few hundred miles from Navidad, two sizable waves struck the vessel, tipping it over, flooding it with water, and carrying away its helmsman. The sailors could hardly attend to Martín's orders to right the ship due to their fatigue, hunger, and the disorientation caused by the waves. Navigating with just their foresail, the crew experienced calmer weather thereafter and reached their departure port of Navidad on 9 August 1565, three months and twenty days after leaving the Philippines. Martín, Arellano, and their remaining crew of 15 became the first men to make the west–east return voyage from Asia to the Americas.

Approximation of Martín's route during the return voyage according to Andrés Reséndez. Martín left the Philippines on 21 April and arrived in Navidad on 9 August.

Martín and the voyagers of the San Lucas were celebrated in Mexico for their accomplishment and made plans to travel to Spain for a meeting with King Philip II. This period of celebration was interrupted on 8 October 1565 when the fleet's flagship, the San Pedro, returned to Mexico, having also completed the return voyage. Legazpi's grandson, Felipe de Salcedo, had served as its captain, with Urdaneta as his advisor. The San Pedro had departed Cebu on 1 June and also followed a northerly route, though they never sailed much higher than the 41st parallel and sometimes dipped below the 38th parallel.

Legazpi and his advisor Urdaneta were both highly suspicious of Arellano and Martín, believing they had deliberately separated the San Lucas from the rest of the fleet. Legazpi's legal representative Gabriel Díez worked quickly to prevent Arellano and Martín from sailing to Spain and ordered them to appear before Legazpi himself, who had remained in a newly established Philippine colony. To the Real Audiencia of Mexico, Gabriel Díez presented charges against Arellano and Martín for disobedience, desertion, and the murder of the two sailors that they threw overboard. The Audiencia heard Arellano's testimony on 22 November, which Martín and Arellano both signed.

The Real Audiencia dismissed Legazpi's charges, as there were multiple pieces of evidence indicating their innocence: multiple pilots had noted a storm when the San Lucas separated; the crew of the San Lucas had sailed around the Philippines searching for the rest of the fleet and had left crosses and a jar of letters; and they had returned directly to Navidad instead of the Spice Islands, where they could have acquired spices and silk and sold them for personal profit, or any other location.

== Final expedition ==
The Real Audiencia of Mexico permitted Arellano to sail to Spain but ordered Martín to lead a voyage back to the Philippines to resupply Legazpi's colony. Martín understood that this was a punishment for his alleged desertion and that Legazpi would have him executed as soon as he arrived. To convince Martín to carry out the expedition, and possibly to gain leverage on him, the Audiencia granted him 11,000 ducats to purchase a ship and contract a crew. Martín and his associates soon squandered the money and were imprisoned for embezzlement. The Audiencia selected a ship and captain for Martín and released him from prison; separately, they ordered Legazpi to hang Martín upon his arrival.

Martín's ship, the San Jerónimo, departed Acapulco on 1 May 1566. There is no consensus for the size of its crew, which included many allies of Martín; estimates range from 100 to 170. Soon after setting sail, Martín informed his captain, Pero Sánchez Pericón, that he had no intention of sailing to Legazpi's colony in Cebu and offered to navigate to Japan or Mindanao, where they could enrich themselves. Pericón refused, leading Martín to conspire against him. He began by inciting the sailors to kill Pericón's prized horse, which they did. Enraged, the captain offered a reward of 1,000 pesos for information on anyone conspiring against him and one for 400 pesos for information on whoever killed his horse. Nobody claimed these rewards, and Pericón and his son were left with few allies. At this point, Martín had a large number of co-conspirators against Pericón, including the sergeants Juan Ortiz de Mosquera—who hated Pericón due to his mistreatment of the soldiers and his son's lack of discipline—and Pedro Núñez de Solorzano; the sailor Bartolomé de Lara; the scribe Juan de Zaldivar; and the soldier Felipe del Campo.

On the night of 3 June, Mosquera and Lara broke into the captain's quarters and stabbed Pericón and his son to death; Martín stood outside with a sword and shield to prevent anyone from intervening. Mosquera, popular among the men of the ship, was named the new captain and announced his plan to continue to Cebu. He was suspicious of Martín and watched him closely, even considering hanging him preemptively, but on 21 June, Martín successfully orchestrated Mosquera's murder. While Mosquera, Martín, and others were eating breakfast, sailors accosted Mosquera and bound his hands and feet. Martín informed Mosquera that he was to be executed for murdering Pericón and had him thrown into the ocean, still alive. Martín also justified the execution afterwards by labeling Mosquera a sodomite.

=== Marooning ===
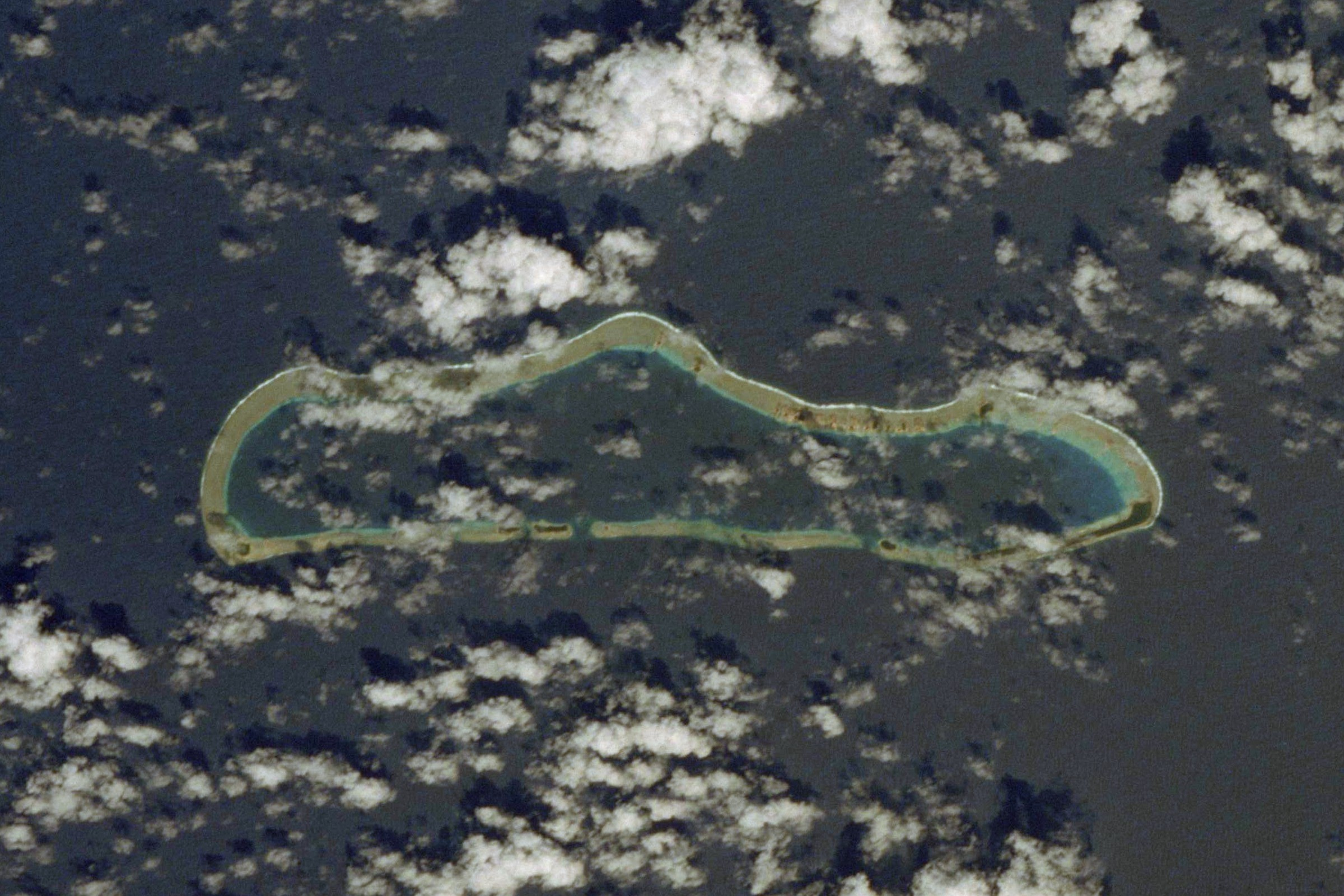
Ujelang Atoll

The San Jerónimo arrived at the Marshall Islands on 29 June, with Martín establishing himself as the vessel's leader. After a week, the San Jerónimo nearly wrecked against a reef before the sailor Lara, contrary to Martín's orders, took control of the ship and led it into a channel, where the crew dropped anchor safely; they were inside Ujelang Atoll. Martín, intending to maroon those disloyal to him, ordered nearly everyone to leave the ship on the pretext that it needed to be repaired. He then spent days on Ujelang speaking to the San Jerónimo's men and attempting to gain their loyalty.

On 16 July, inspired by the exhortations of the ship's chaplain, Juan de Viveros, a group of dissenters led by the boatswain Rodrigo del Angle rowed to the San Jerónimo, wounded Martín's guards, and took command. Martín, still ashore, was confident that his men on the vessel would regain control and doubted the ship would be able to travel far without sails or navigational instruments, which had been removed. However, a growing number of men began abandoning Martín and swimming to the San Jerónimo to avoid being marooned. Martín ordered his followers to also swim to the ship to retake it, causing the men aboard the vessel to attempt to depart; the strong current pushed the ship, which lacked sails, back into the atoll. At this point, Martín's followers and the men aboard the ship negotiated. Knowing they had no chance of recapturing the ship, Martín's group accepted four days' worth of food in return for supplying the sails and navigational tools. The San Jerónimo then departed on 21 July, marooning Martín and 26 of his associates. The ship reached Cebu, a voyage of 2000 nautical miles and three months, on 15 October 1566 in terrible condition and without encountering en route the relief that had been hoped for.

After the marooning, there was no confirmed sighting of Martín and his men. In 1568, Álvaro de Mendaña de Neira stopped at an island in the Marshall Islands. Based on the presence of a rope and chisel on the island, he believed that Martín and the marooners had been there. In 1721, despite the Caroline Islands lying at least 250 miles from Ujelang, the missionary Juan Antonio Cantova theorized that the fair skin of some inhabitants of the Carolines was a trait passed by the marooners, suggesting that Martín and his associates left descendants there.

== Legacy ==
=== Achievements ===
Martín and the crew aboard the San Lucas became the first men to sail across the Pacific and then make the west–east return voyage from Asia to the Americas. Before him, numerous European explorers had sailed from the Americas to Asia but none had managed to return west to east. For example, López de Villalobos was forced to turn back halfway between the Philippines and Hawaii and eventually surrendered to the Portuguese, while the survivors of the Magellan expedition were only able to return to Europe by passing through the Indian and Atlantic Oceans. Additionally, although there is evidence that Polynesian mariners may have reached the Americas, Martín's voyage was still unique in being the first to originate in the Americas, arrive in Asia, and then make a successful return.

The northerly routes that Martín and Urdaneta pioneered during their returns proved that a west–east crossing was possible. For two centuries, Spanish ships followed their paths, sailing at much higher latitudes when crossing west–east compared to their east–west voyages. The historian Andrés Reséndez credits Martín with permanently linking Asia with the Americas and causing the emergence of a transpacific exchange of crops, animals, and precious metals. Martín and his men were also the first Europeans to spot a number of islands, among them Chuuk Lagoon, Pulap Atoll, and Sorol. Due to Arellano and Martín's alleged desertion and untrustworthiness, the veracity of their accomplishments has been questioned by some historians; Pierre Chaunu described their voyage as "merely anecdotal", while Harry Kelsey doubted that the San Lucas ever reached the Philippines.

=== Character ===
Whether Martín deliberately separated the San Lucas from the Legazpi fleet is uncertain. Legazpi, Urdaneta, and others on the voyage believed that he had done so intentionally; the mid-20th century writers José de Arteche and Mairin Mitchell concurred. Conversely, Reséndez described the belief that Martín had intentionally separated the San Lucas from the other ships as "at least excessive and quite likely unfounded", basing this assessment on the evidence laid out in Martín's defense before the Real Audiencia of Mexico.

Regardless, the circumstances of both of Martín's expeditions have led to him generally being characterised as treacherous and conniving. The author Andrew Sharp referred to him as "notorious" and a "plotter", writing that he "was born to be in mischief". The writer William Lytle Schurz called him "faithless" and noted that "the character of [Martín] ... lent color to the suspicions of Legazpi". The Filipino historian Junald Dawa Ango, while discussing the San Jerónimo expedition, labeled Martín a "treacherous pilot".

== Map ==
A representative selection of the places visited by Martín during his initial voyage to the Philippines (purple), his return voyage to Mexico (orange), and his final expedition (yellow), as well as other places mentioned in this article (cyan).

== Works cited ==
- Ango, Junald Dawa (June 2010). "The Cebu-Acapulco Galleon Trade". Philippine Quarterly of Culture and Society. 38 (2). University of San Carlos Publications: 147–173. JSTOR 29792703. Archived from the original on 14 November 2020.
- Arteche Aramburu, José de (2020) [1943]. Urdaneta: el dominador de los espacios del océano Pacífico [Urdaneta: Dominator of the Pacific Ocean] (in Spanish). ePubLibre.
- Casey, James (21 June 1999). Early Modern Spain: A Social History. Taylor & Francis. doi:10.4324/9780203026434. ISBN 9780203026434.
- "Culverin". Encyclopædia Britannica. 2 March 2015. Archived from the original on 13 September 2025.
- "Harquebus". Encyclopædia Britannica. 17 May 2024. Archived from the original on 25 March 2019.
- Kelsey, Harry (April 1986). "Finding the Way Home: Spanish Exploration of the Round-Trip Route across the Pacific Ocean". Western Historical Quarterly. 17 (2): 145–164. doi:10.2307/969278. JSTOR 969278. Archived from the original on 26 August 2024.
- Kiste, Robert C. (21 February 2025). "Marshall Islands". Encyclopedia Britannica. Archived from the original on 19 June 2022.
- Landín Carrasco, Amancio (1992). "Los hallazgos españoles en el Pacífico" [Spanish Discoveries in the Pacific]. Revista Española del Pacífico (in Spanish). 2 (2): 13–37. ISSN 1131-6284.
- Lessa, William A. (1975). Drake's Island of Thieves. University of Hawaii Press. doi:10.1515/9780824886165-006.
- López Urrutia, Carlos (June 1988). "La Isla de los Barbudos" [The Island of the Bearded Ones] (PDF). Revista de Marina (in Spanish). 3 (88): 315–320. ISSN 0719-4129. Archived (PDF) from the original on 9 May 2025.
- Mitchell, Mairin (December 1964). Friar Andres de Urdaneta, O.S.A. Macdonald and Evans.
- Moreno-Mayar, J. Víctor; et al. (3 November 2014). "Genome-wide Ancestry Patterns in Rapanui Suggest Pre-European Admixture with Native Americans". Current Biology. 24 (21): 2518–2525. Bibcode:2014CBio...24.2518M. doi:10.1016/j.cub.2014.09.057. PMID 25447991. Archived from the original on 13 November 2024.
- Nowell, Charles E. (May 1962). "Arellano versus Urdaneta". Pacific Historical Review. 31 (2). University of California Press: 111–120. doi:10.2307/3636569. JSTOR 3636569. Archived from the original on 9 September 2022.
- Reséndez, Andrés (18 October 2021). "How History Erased the Black Mariner Who 'Opened' the Pacific". Time. Archived from the original on 24 March 2025.
- Reséndez, Andrés (27 September 2022). Conquering the Pacific. Mariner Books. ISBN 9780063269064.
- Sánchez Granel, Álvaro; Jiménez, Claudia; Cappa, Cristina (2023). "Antecedentes cartográficos de los primeros asentamientos españoles en el Río de la Plata" [Cartographic Backgrounds of the First Spanish Settlements in the Río de la Plata]. Boletín de la Real Sociedad Geográfica (in Spanish). CLX. Real Sociedad Geográfica: 89–112. ISSN 2603-6010.
- Schreurs, Peter (March 1985). "Castilla, Castilla, Cabalian: Amigos, Amigos! A Chapter in the History of Discovery". Philippine Quarterly of Culture and Society. 13 (1). University of San Carlos Publications: 14–33. JSTOR 29791843.
- Schurz, William Lytle (1939). The Manila Galleon. E. P. Dutton.
- Sharp, Andrew (1960). The Discovery of the Pacific Islands. Clarendon Press.
- Sharp, Andrew (1961). Adventurous Armada. Whitcombe and Tombs.
- Sierra de la Calle, Blas (September 2022). "Fr. Andrés de Urdaneta y su legado: el Santo Niño de Cebú, el Tornaviaje, el Galeón de Manila, la evangelización de Filipinas" [Fr. Andrés de Urdaneta and his legacy: The Santo Niño de Cebú, the Return Voyage, the Manila Galleon, the evangelization of the Philippines] (PDF). Archivo Agustiniano (in Spanish). 105 (223): 301–502. doi:10.53111/aa.v105i223.1072. Archived (PDF) from the original on 16 May 2025.
- St. John, Harold (April 1948). "Report on the Flora of Pingelap Atoll, Caroline Islands, Micronesia, and Observations on the Vocabulary of the Native Inhabitants: Pacific Plant Studies". Pacific Science. 2 (2). University of Hawaii Press: 97–113. Archived from the original on 8 October 2025.
- Suter, Max (January 2019). "The 1563 MI 8 Puerto de la Navidad Subduction-Zone and 1567 Mw 7.2 Ameca Crustal Earthquakes (Western Mexico): New Insights from Sixteenth-Century Sources". Seismological Research Letters. 90 (1). Seismological Society of America: 366–375. Bibcode:2019SeiRL..90..366S. doi:10.1785/0220180304. Archived from the original on 28 December 2022.
- Williams, Mary Wilhelmine (February 1922). "The Treaty of Tordesillas and the Argentine–Brazilian Boundary Settlement". The Hispanic American Historical Review. 5 (1). Duke University Press: 3–23. doi:10.2307/2505977. JSTOR 2505977. Archived from the original on 21 April 2024.
