= Erikub Atoll =

Coral atoll in the Marshall Islands

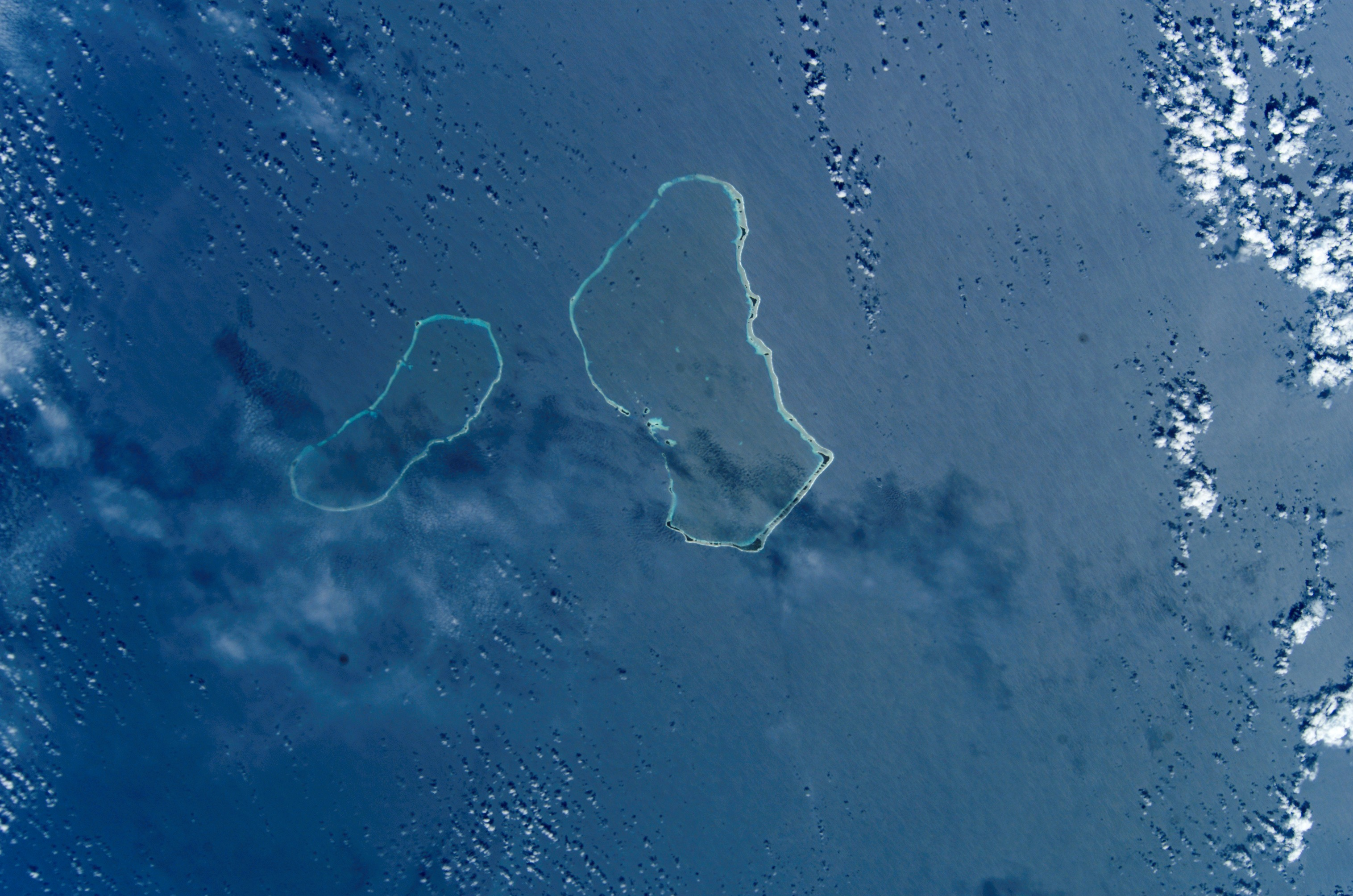
- NASA picture of Erikub Atoll on the left (south) and Wotje on the right (north)

- Location within Marshall Islands

Geography
- Location: North Pacific
- Coordinates: 09°08′30″N 170°00′00″E
- Archipelago: Ratak
- Total islands: 14
- Area: 1.53 km^{2} (0.59 sq mi)
- Highest elevation: 3 m (10 ft)

Administration
- Marshall Islands

Demographics
- Population: 0
- Ethnic groups: Marshallese

Erikub Atoll (Marshallese: Ādkup, [ærʲ(u)ɡʷupʲ]) is an uninhabited coral atoll of fourteen islands in the Pacific Ocean, located in the Ratak Chain of the Marshall Islands. Its total land area is only 1.53 square kilometers (0.59 sq mi), but it encloses a lagoon with an area of 230 square kilometers (89 sq mi). It is located slightly south of Wotje.

== History ==
The first recorded sighting of Erikub Atoll by Europeans was on 29 June 1566 by the Spanish galleon San Jerónimo then commanded by pilot Lope Martín. However, it is likely that it had already been previously sighted by the Spanish expedition of Ruy López de Villalobos between December 1542 and January 1543. Lope Martín, who had been pilot of the patache San Lucas on its voyage from New Spain to the Philippines the previous year, had on this occasion mutinied with a gang of twenty six sailors and soldiers and murdered the San Jerónimo's captain, Pero Sánchez Pericón. The conspirators, including Martín, were later marooned on the Namonuito Atoll.

Erikub Atoll was claimed by the German Empire along with the rest of the Marshall Islands in 1885. After World War I, the island came under the South Seas Mandate of the Empire of Japan. The base became part of the vast US Naval Base Marshall Islands. Following the end of World War II, Erikub came under the control of the United States as part of the Trust Territory of the Pacific Islands. The island has been part of the independent Republic of the Marshall Islands since 1986.

== Ecology ==
Loj island, within the atoll, is a nesting site of the green turtle.

== See also ==
- Desert island
- List of islands
