= Holy Cross Priory =

Holy Cross Priory may refer to:

- Holy Cross Priory, Cross-in-Hand, East Sussex, England
- Holy Cross Priory, Dalby, Sweden
- Holy Cross Priory, Leicester, England
- Priory of the Holy Cross, Rathfran, Ireland
