= José Luis Martín Descalzo =

Spanish priest, journalist and writer

José Luis Martín Descalzo (1930–1991) was a Spanish priest, journalist and writer. A prolific author, he published more than 50 books in a wide range of genres - novels, short stories, plays, poetry, as well as numerous volumes of essays. He won the Premio Nadal for his novel La frontera de Dios.

== Works ==
=== Novels ===
- El hombre que no sabía pecar (as Martín Azcárate)
- Diálogo para cuatro muertos (Oviedo, 1953)
- La frontera de Dios (1956)
- Lobos, perros y corderos (1978)
- El demonio de media tarde (1982)

=== Non-fiction ===
- Un periodista en el concilio, 1962-1965
- Razones para la esperanza (1984)
- Un cura se confiesa (1955)
- Siempre es Viernes Santo
- Razones para la alegría
- Razones para el amor
- Razones para vivir
- Razones desde la otra orilla
- Razones para la esperanza
- Las razones de su vida
- Vida y misterio de Jesús de Nazaret
  - I. Los comienzos
  - II. El mensaje
  - III. La cruz y la gloria
- Apócrifo de María
- Por un mundo menos malo
- Jesucristo (Edit. Urbión, seven volumes)
- El verdadero rostro de María Rafols
- El sermón de las siete palabras
- Tarancón, el cardenal del cambio
- Reconciliación entre españoles
- El misterio de la caridad de Juana de Arco
- Folletos de Mundo Cristiano
- El Concilio de Juan y Pablo
- La Iglesia, nuestra hija
- Reflexiones de un enfermo en torno al dolor
- Las razones de su vida

=== Verse ===
- Fábulas con Dios al fondo (1957)
- Camino de la cruz (1959)
- Querido mundo terrible (1970)
- Apócrifo (1975)
- Apócrifo del domingo (1982)

=== Plays ===
- La hoguera feliz (1962)
- A dos barajas (1972)
- Godspell (1974), translation
- El segundo juicio de Galileo (1978)
- Fuenteovejuna, by Lope de Vega
- Las prostitutas os precederán en el reino de los cielos (1986)
- El peregrino (2001)

=== Stories ===
- Paco y su gata
- San José García
- Dios es alegre

=== Other ===
- Testamento del pájaro solitario
- Fábulas con Dios de fondo
- Lo que María guardaba en su corazón
- Diálogos de pasión
- El joven Dios
- Fragmentos de una confesión
- Nacido de mujer

== Selected works in English ==
- A Priest Confesses, translated into English by Rita Goldberg, ed. Mairin Mitchell (The Catholic Book Club, 1962)
