= Ujlān volcanic complex =

Seamount in the Pacific Ocean

Location
- Location: Marshall Islands

Geology
- Type: Volcanic complex

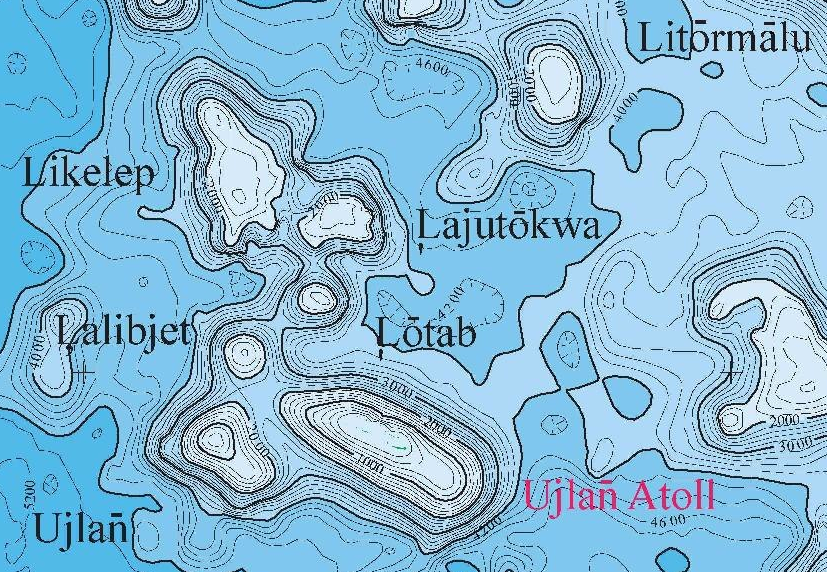
Seamounts and an atoll in the volcanic complex

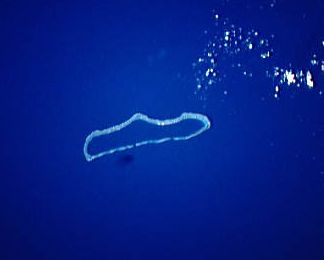
Ujelan atoll

Ujlān volcanic complex is a group of seamounts in the Marshall Islands. The complex consists of the seamounts Ļajutōkwa, Ļalibjet, Likelep, Ļotāb and Ujlān which with a minimum depth of 1,250 metres (4,100 ft) is the shallowest part of the complex; sometimes Ujelang Atoll is also considered to be a part of the complex; Eniwetok atoll and Lo-En seamount form a cluster together with this volcanic complex.

These are simple single-peaked seamounts with the exception of the three-peaked Ujlān and there appear to be two rift zones associated with the complex. Between the seamounts the seafloor is covered with debris while the seamounts themselves are covered with varying thicknesses of pelagic sediments; however in general volcanic rocks and mostly breccia are the dominant components. Minerals found in samples from the volcanic complex include biotite, hornblende and plagioclase. Video observation has noted sediment deposits with ferromanganese knolls on some of the seamounts. There is little evidence of reefs but most seamounts were affected by slumps; in addition there are frequently terraces and volcanic cones on the seamounts.

The volcanic complex and neighbouring structures may be of Cretaceous age but with some scatter. Likelep features probably Campanian-age rocks and radiometric dating has yielded an age of 81.4–82.8 million years ago for Ļalibjet, 81.2 ± 0.5 for Ļajutōkwa, 82.5 ± 0.2 for Likelep, 79.7 ± 0.4 for Ļotāb and 80.1 ± 0.5 for Ujlān. The complex is also known as the Ujlān seamount trail and its formation of this complex may be related to the Rarotonga hotspot while the geochemistry shows affinities to the Samoa hotspot.

The seamount complex is located within the exclusive economic zone of the Marshall Islands, and Ļalibjet has been considered a site for cobalt mining. The names of the seamounts come from Marshallese; Ļajutōkwa was the first navigator chief in the northern Marshall Islands, Ļalibjet is a sea god, Likelep is a place on Ujlān and Ļotāb like his ancestor Litōrmalū is a legendary navigator. One source has given Ļalibjet as the old name for Likelep.
