= Eleanor Berwick =

Retired English vintner

Eleanor Muriel Berwick (born 4 November 1943), previously Knowles, is a retired English wine-grower.

Born in 1943 at Mengo, in British East Africa, Eleanor Knowles was the daughter of Robert Knowles OBE, Commissioner of Trade and Customs, by his marriage to Phyllis Muriel Jarrett. In 1947, the family moved to North Borneo. She returned to Britain to be educated at St Winifred's School, Llanfairfechan, Kendal Girls High School, Westmorland, and Newnham College, Cambridge. On leaving Cambridge in 1964, she married Ian Berwick MBE; they have two sons.

In 1974, after retiring from the rubber industry, Eleanor and Ian Berwick planted Bruisyard, a ten-acre vineyard at the village of the same name near Saxmundham in Suffolk, unusually deciding to plant only Müller-Thurgau vines. By 1984 they were among the most successful of English wine growers, and at a time of renewed interest in wine-growing helped to spread the news that establishing commercial vineyards in Britain was now possible. In 1997 Ian Berwick was chairman of the United Kingdom Vineyards Association. In 2005, Eleanor Berwick was a member of the Bruisyard Parish Plan Committee.

The Bruisyard vineyard continued to produce wine following the retirement of the couple, becoming also a herb centre.
