= Nesta Roberts =

Welsh journalist and author

Nesta Roberts (10 January 1913 – 16 January 2009) was a Welsh journalist and author, the first woman to be in charge of the news desk on a British national newspaper. She served as Paris correspondent of The Guardian from 1965 to 1972.

== Early life ==
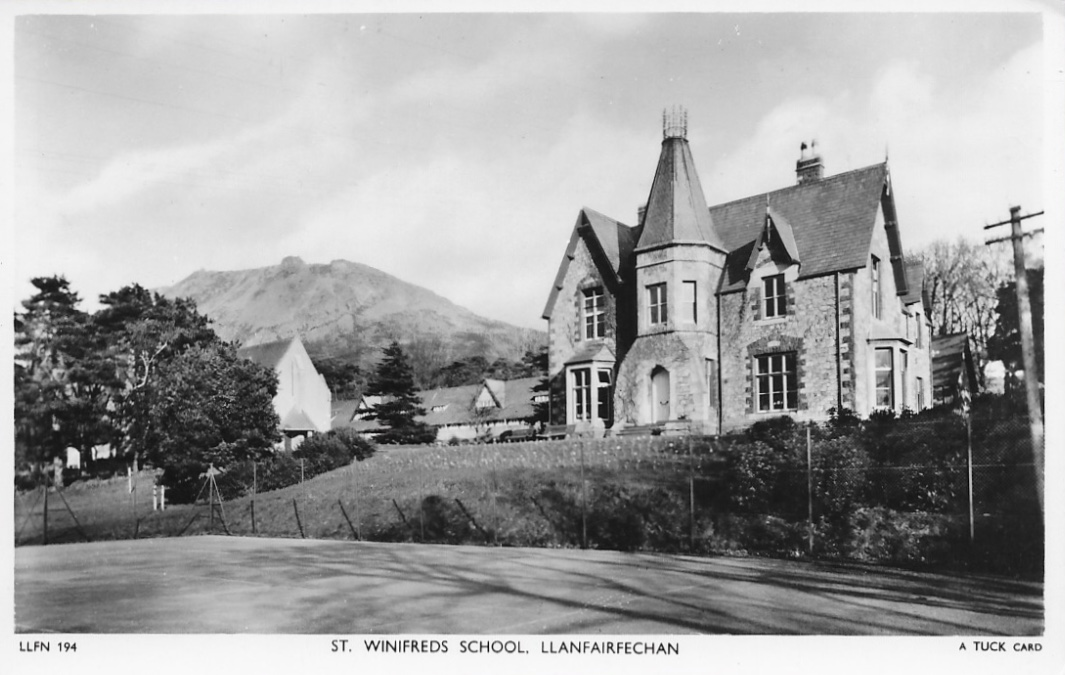
St Winifred's School, c. 1923

The daughter of a merchant seaman, Roberts grew up in North Wales, speaking both English and Welsh, and was educated at St Winifred's School, Llanfairfechan.

== Career ==
Roberts began work as a journalist on a weekly newspaper in South Wales and pursued her career in Lincolnshire. At the age of nineteen, she made her first contributions to what was then The Manchester Guardian, writing articles called "backpagers" at three guineas each.

In 1937, Roberts's first book appeared, a history of the first fifty years of her old school, St Winifred's.

An article called "Single to Manchester" led to Roberts joining the staff of The Manchester Guardian in May 1947. She later joined the news room staff in Manchester, remaining there for eleven years and becoming deputy news editor. When the newspaper began to be printed in London in 1961, Roberts was appointed as its first news editor there, becoming the first woman to hold such a position on a British national newspaper. However, as she had no experience of organizing specialist reporters, she saw herself as an odd choice by the editor, Alastair Hetherington who was to go on working in Manchester. After two years, she was succeeded as news editor by John Cole and went back to writing articles on health and welfare. She also wrote books on healthcare.

In 1965, Roberts was sent to Paris to cover for the sickness of the Paris correspondent Darsie Gillie. She soon became the permanent post-holder and held the job for seven years, which proved to be her last with The Guardian.

In April 1968, Roberts raised concerns about a marked fall in the birth-rate in France, proposing that higher family allowances would encourage larger families. During the May 68 upheavals, her radical political instincts led her to support the students.

After retiring from working for The Guardian full-time, Roberts stayed in France, contributing an occasional column called "Letters from Paris". She called the French "the least boring people in Europe", and was the author of The Face of France (1976) and Companion Guide to Normandy (1980).

== Retirement ==
On her return from France, Roberts retired to live in Louth, in Lincolnshire, attracted by the High Anglicanism of its parish church. Conservative in everything except politics, she loved medieval churches, travelled everywhere by train and bus, and never married, dying in 2009 at the age of ninety-six. An obituary noted that "She was full of exuberance, seriousness, good judgment and wit."

== Selected publications ==
- S. Winifred's, Llanfairfechan. The story of fifty years, 1887–1937 (Shrewsbury: Wilding & Son, 1937)
- In Search of a Quiet Holiday (Manchester Guardian & Evening News, 1960)
- Everybody's Business: The 1959 Mental Health Act and the Community (National Association for Mental Health, 1960)
- "Not in My Perfect Mind": The Care of Mentally Frail Old People (National Association for Mental Health, 1963)
- To Tell the Truth: Mental Hospitals Today (National Association for Mental Health, 1966)
- Mental Health and Mental Illness (London: Routledge & Kegan Paul, 1967)
- Cheadle Royal Hospital: A bicentenary history (1967)
- Our Future Selves: Care of the Elderly (London: Allen & Unwin, 2 April 1970)
- A Doctor in Practice, with Geoffrey Hale (London, Routledge & Kegan Paul, 1974, ISBN 0-7100-7745-9)
- The Face of France (London: Hodder and Stoughton, 1976)
- Le tour de la France par une anglaise (Paris: Buchet/Chastel, 1979)
- The Companion Guide to Normandy (Prentice-Hall, 1983)
