= Storm over Spain =

1937 book by Mairin Mitchell

- Author: Mairin Mitchell
- Language: English
- Genre: Politics
- Publisher: Fredric Warburg as Secker & Warburg
- Publication date: 1937
- Publication place: United Kingdom
- Media type: Print, 271 pages
- Followed by: Atlantic Battle and the Future of Ireland (1941)

Storm over Spain is a book by Mairin Mitchell, a pacifist commentary on the Spanish Civil War published in 1937, during the war.

Mitchell was a British and Irish journalist and author of articles and books on political and naval matters.

== Background ==
Mitchell, a journalist based in England, was a frequent traveller on the continent and had made visits to Spain, studying Catalonia in particular. A Roman Catholic, and the daughter of an Irish doctor, in her youth she had been a member of an anarchist circle in London. With a Hungarian friend, Mitchell made a long visit to Andalusia in the early summer of 1936, during a period of strikes, shortly before the civil war broke out.

== Themes ==
Mitchell's book analyses the background to the civil war and the elements of the struggle, in particular setting out the history of anarchism in Spain, in the context of the revolutionary nature of the ongoing war. Mitchell writes of her travels through Spain with a friend during the strike period of 1936, giving a picture of the workers in the towns and villages of Andalusia shortly before the civil war broke out and drawing parallels between the condition of agriculture in Spain and of industry in Ireland. She aims to show that war as waged in the 1930s was useless as a way of resolving such conflicts. The dust jacket of the book offers a quotation from the work of the Irish playwright Terence MacSwiney:

"Our enemies are brothers from whom we are estranged."

== Reception ==
While he was writing his Homage to Catalonia, George Orwell reviewed Storm over Spain for Time and Tide and recommended it, commending its well-informed analysis and stating that it was "written by a Catholic, but very sympathetic to the Spanish Anarchists". Orwell notes

The Anarchists and Syndicalists have been persistently misrepresented in England, and the average English person still retains his eighteen-ninetyish notion that Anarchism is the same thing as anarchy… the pity is that so much of what the Anarchists achieved (in Spain, especially in Catalonia) has already been undone.

In the same review, Orwell savaged Spanish Rehearsal by Arnold Lunn. Mitchell wrote to Orwell to thank him for his review but added that she had read The Road to Wigan Pier, and in politics they were on different sides. She also stated that she was Irish, rather than English, as he had supposed.

The New Statesman said of the book that it would add fuel to no political controversies, as its author was almost excessively even-handed between left and right, but it concluded that "Books such as hers, because of the direct observation they contain, are of value".

The Ireland To-day reviewer thought Storm over Spain was unlucky to appear at the same moment as Elliot Paul’s The Life and Death of a Spanish Town, which it compared with The Story of San Michele.

Fredric Warburg, the publisher of Storm over Spain, admitted in his autobiography that the book had been "a flop", but added that it was "the only pacifist study I ever read of the Spanish War".

In 2021, Katrina Goldstone commented in the Dublin Review of Books on the reprinting of a work by Peadar O'Donnell

For anyone interested in history and cultural memory as regards the Spanish Civil War, or indeed the Irish social history of the Thirties, it will provide a window onto that contested era. Salud! An Irishman in Spain stands within that small body of Spanish Civil War writing by Irish men and women ‑ Ewart Milne, Charles Donnelly, Blanaid Salkeld, Mairin Mitchell, Leslie Daiken – whose poems and texts also performed acts of witness, solidarity and elegy.
