= Coolavokig ambush =

1921 IRA ambush during the Irish War of Independence

- Part of the Irish War of Independence
Date	25 February 1921
Location	Coolavokig, County Cork, Ireland 51.925°N 9.105°W
Result	IRA victory

Belligerents
Irish Republican Army (1st Cork Brigade)	(United Kingdom of Great Britain and Ireland) Royal Irish Constabulary (Auxiliary Division)

Commanders and leaders
Seán O'Hegarty	(United Kingdom of Great Britain and Ireland) Major Seafield Grant †

Strength
62 volunteers 2 Lewis guns	70 soldiers 7 constables

Casualties and losses
None	3 dead (RIC sources); 14–16 Auxiliaries dead (IRA sources)
- Location within island of Ireland

The Coolavokig ambush (Irish: Luíochán Chúil an Bhuacaigh) was carried out by the Irish Republican Army (IRA) on 25 February 1921, during the Irish War of Independence. It took place at Coolavokig, on the road between Macroom and Ballyvourney, County Cork. A 60-man flying column of the IRA's 1st Cork Brigade under Seán O'Hegarty, ambushed a 70-man convoy of the Auxiliary Division under Major Seafield Grant, sparking a four-hour battle. Ten Auxiliaries were killed, including Major Grant, and others wounded. The IRA column left the area when British reinforcements arrived. After the ambush, British forces stopped carrying out raids and patrols in the area.

== Preparations ==
The IRA flying column had been attempting to ambush the Auxiliaries for two weeks but had always missed them. As they occupied the ambush position over a few days, their position became known and a force of 70 Auxiliaries and 7 RIC constables moved against them, heavily armed with rifles, machine-guns and grenades. The sixty-two IRA volunteers included units from the 1st, 7th, and 8th battalions of the 1st Cork Brigade, and was divided into four sections. Apart from commander Seán O'Hegarty, the main IRA officers were Dan "Sandow" O'Donovan and Dan Corkery. The IRA was armed with sixty rifles, several shotguns and revolvers, and two Lewis guns, but significantly, no grenades. The British forces, travelling in eight lorries and two cars, also carried four Irish hostages with them.

== Battle ==
Around 8am on 25 February, IRA scouts signalled the approach of the British force. They were forewarned about the IRA position however, and approached with caution, when a republican leaving his post turned to run back, and was seen from the leading lorry. When half of the lorries came into the ambush position the IRA opened fire. According to An Cosantóir, one lorry immediately turned around and sped back to Macroom.

Rifles and a Lewis machine-gun from the IRA's no.1 section, and ten rifles from no.4 section, opened fire, as they were the only republican units that had a field of fire on the lorries. They then dropped to the ground to avoid return fire. Sections no.2 and no.3 swung round to the east, on a hillside, in an attempt to encircle the British northern flank, but they could get no closer than 500 yards.

The Auxiliaries were quickly losing ground and taking casualties. Major Grant was killed while rallying his forces. The British forces retreated into two nearby cottages. The IRA closed in and as they were preparing to bomb the cottages, large numbers of RIC reinforcements approached and began encircling the area. After fighting a half-hour rear guard action the IRA flying column retreated towards the north-west. The engagement at Coolavokig lasted four hours, until soldiers of the Manchester Regiment arrived.

== Aftermath ==
It later transpired that the Auxiliary forces were just part of a large round-up operation planned for that day which included 600 British Army troops from Cork, Ballincollig, Bandon, Clonakilty, Skibbereen, Bantry, Dunmanway, Millstreet, Macroom, and Killarney. After the ambush, British forces ceased raiding and patrolling the area west of Macroom, effectively handing it over to IRA control. They were reluctant to enter the area, and only did so later with a strong force of 2,000 men.

The IRA suffered no casualties. However, the number of British casualties has been disputed to this day. The British claimed that only Major (Auxiliary Commandant) James Seafield-Grant was killed during the ambush, and that two other Auxiliaries later died of their wounds. The IRA claimed that between 14 and 16 members of the British force were killed. The Digest of Service for the 1st Battalion, Manchester Regiment recorded that on 18 March 1921, a party proceeded to Coolavokig to destroy houses believed to have been used by the IRA.
