= Irish Freedom =

- Type: Former monthly newspaper
- Founded: November 1910
- Ceased publication: 1914
- Political alignment: Irish republican

Irish Freedom was launched in November 1910, as an Irish monthly publication of the Irish Republican Brotherhood movement. It lasted for four years until suppressed in 1914 by the British administration in Ireland.

It was founded in by Tom Clarke in 1910 with financial help from John Daly and Patrick McCartan.

The title was refounded in 1939, again as a monthly publication, by the Connolly Club and published in London.

The newspaper Saoirse Irish Freedom which replaced the Republican Bulletin, the official paper of the Republican Sinn Féin in May 1987 takes its name from the newspaper.

== Notable contributors ==
Contributors included:

- Bulmer Hobson
- P. S. O'Hegarty
- Terence MacSwiney
- Patrick Pearse
- Ernest Blythe
- Piaras Béaslaí
- Roger Casement
- Patrick McCartan
- Brian O'Higgins
- Mairin Mitchell
