= St Winifred's School =

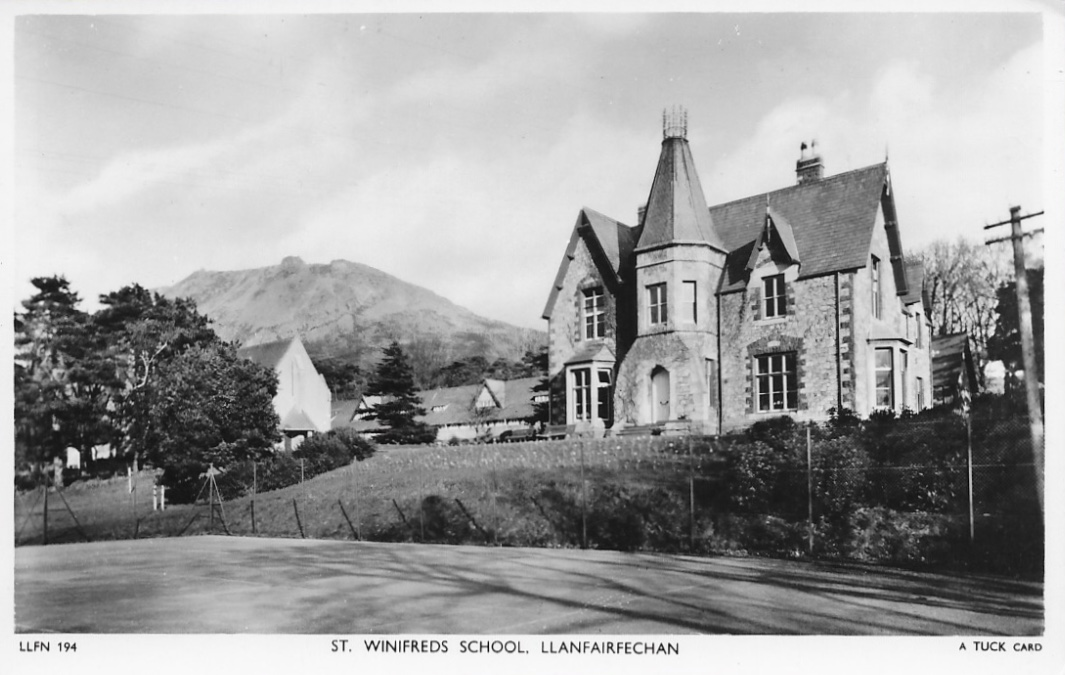
- St Winifred's School, Llanfairfechan

Location
- Llanfairfechan, Conwy County Borough; Wales
- Coordinates: 53.253°N 3.976°W

Information
- Type: Boarding and Day School
- Established: 1887
- Founder: Eleanor Douglas Pennant
- Closed: 1968
- Gender: Girls

St Winifred's School was a school for girls in Llanfairfechan, Conwy County Borough, Wales.

== History ==
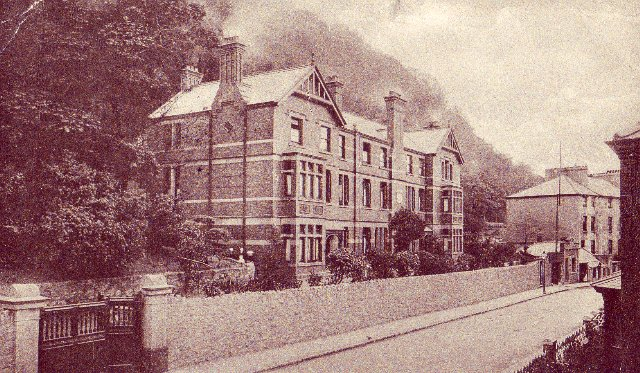
Bron Castell, High Street, Bangor c1905

St. Winifred's was founded on 3 May 1887 and named after the 7th-century Welsh saint, Winefride. Its driving force and primary sponsor was the Honourable Eleanor Douglas Pennant, one of the daughters of Lord Penrhyn, at a time when there was little high-quality secondary education available for girls. Most pupils were boarders, with a small number of day girls, mostly from a middle-class background. Initially occupying buildings in Bangor, north-west Wales, in 1922 the school moved to the small coastal town of Llanfairfechan, eight miles east of Bangor.

Tuition was holistic: 'to provide, upon a sound and accurate system, a religious and useful education for the daughters of clergymen and professional men of limited means, and the agricultural and commercial classes generally'.

The school became a member of the Midland Division of the Woodard Schools, a grouping established by Canon Nathaniel Woodard to support teaching in an Anglican context.

The school closed in 1968, when it was described as “a Church of England Public School of about 160 girls, belonging to the Midland Division of the Woodard Corporation”.

== Location ==
The school was initially situated in three houses in Garfield Terrace along Garth Road, expanding to five as pupil numbers rose. The houses were not designed as or suited to being school accommodation, so the school subsequently moved to the grander 'Bron Castell' on the High Street. The continued success of the school resulted in the purchase of two houses opposite the site (known as Saint Cybi's and Saint Beuno's). The census records that on 2 April 1911 there were three schoolmistresses in residence, together with thirty-one girls aged between eight and seventeen, a cook, a waitress, a housemaid, and a kitchen maid.

Further increasing numbers resulted in a move to a purpose-built site in Llanfairfechan in September 1922, which consisted of separate accommodation, teaching facilities and chapel. The site of the school near the centre of the town is now occupied by modern housing, but is preserved in the name St Winifred's Close.

== Notable pupils ==
- Berta Ruck (1878–1978), author
- Christine Chaundler (1887–1972), writer of children’s books
- Mairin Mitchell (1895–1986), author
- Evelyn Bowen (1911–1994), actress and writer
- Nesta Roberts (1913–2009), journalist and author
- Heather Sears (1935–1994), actress
- Eleanor Berwick (born 1943), wine-grower

== Notable staff ==
- Alwyn Rice Jones (1934–2007), later Archbishop of Wales, was the St Winifred's school chaplain in the 1960s.
