= Mairin Mitchell =

Anglo-Irish journalist, author and translator

- Mitchell in 1920
- Born: Marian Houghton Mitchell; 20 May 1895; Darlington, County Durham, England
- Died: 5 October 1986 (aged 91); Holy Cross Priory, Cross-in-Hand
- Education: St Winifred's School; Bedford College, London
- Occupations: Journalist, author, and translator

Signature
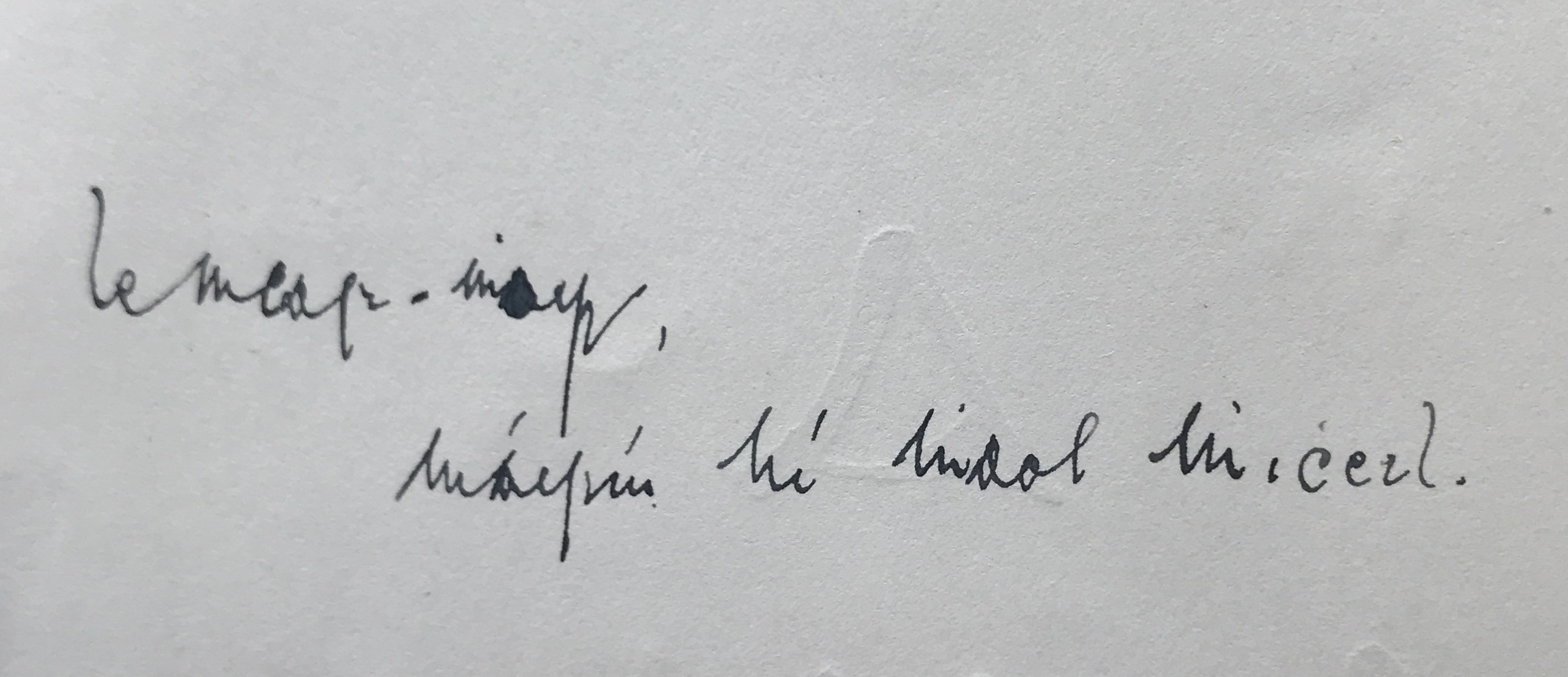

Mairin Marian Mitchell FRGS (20 May 1895 – 5 October 1986), registered at birth as Marian Houghton Mitchell, was a British and Irish journalist and author, mostly on political, naval, and historical subjects. She was also a translator from Spanish to English.

== Early life ==
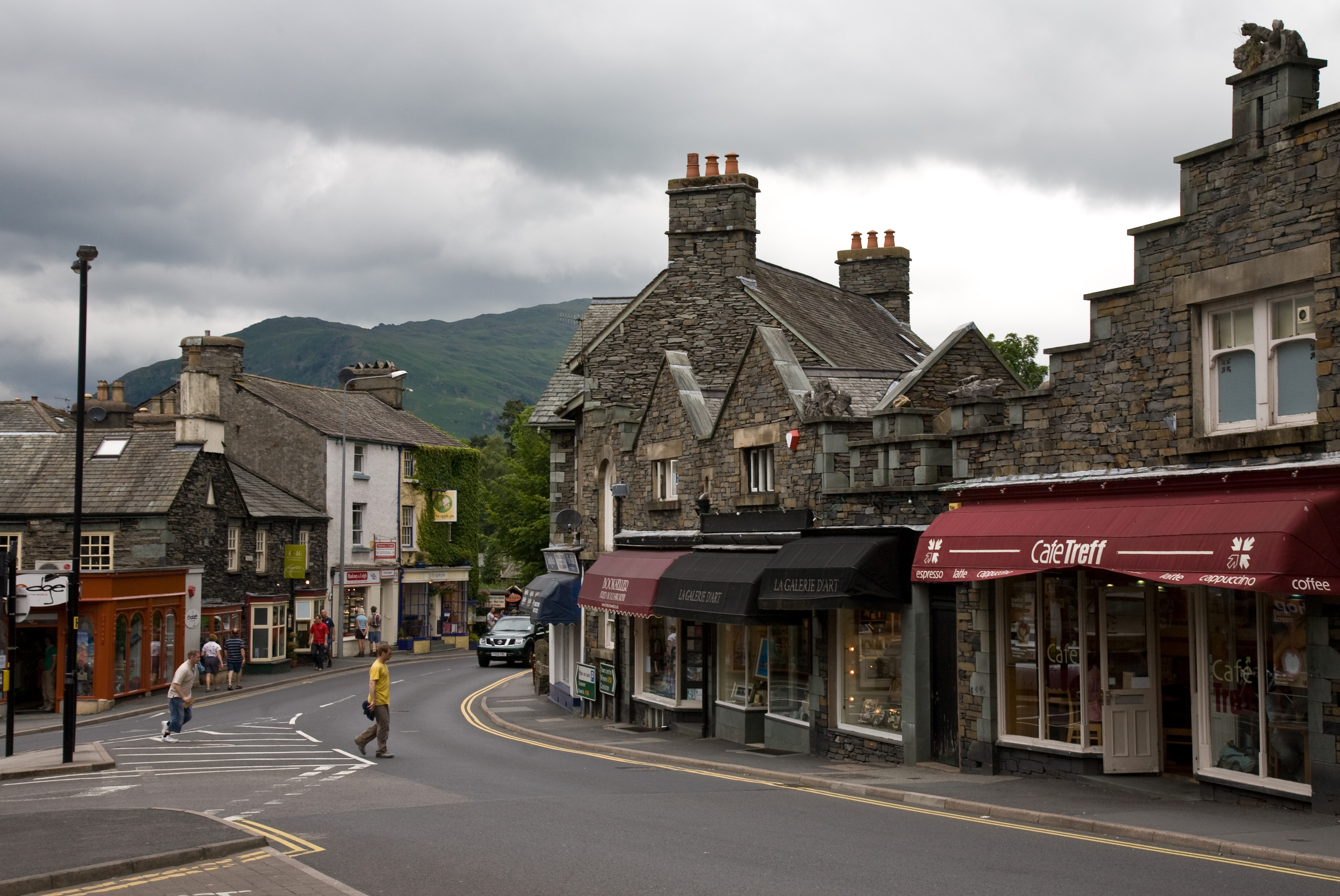
Ambleside

Born at Darlington, County Durham, Mitchell was the daughter of an Irish-born general practitioner at Ambleside, Westmorland, Dr Thomas Houghton Mitchell, and his wife Gertrude Emily Pease. They had married at Darlington in June 1894. His wife's father, Edward Thomas Pease, was a wine and spirit merchant at Darlington and died in 1897, leaving a substantial fortune.

Dr Mitchell had two brothers who were also doctors. In 1901, his older brother Adam G. Mitchell was a GP at Kinnitty, King's County, Ireland. Their Church of Ireland father, Adam Mitchell, Esq., of Parsonstown, was Sessional Crown Solicitor for King's County.

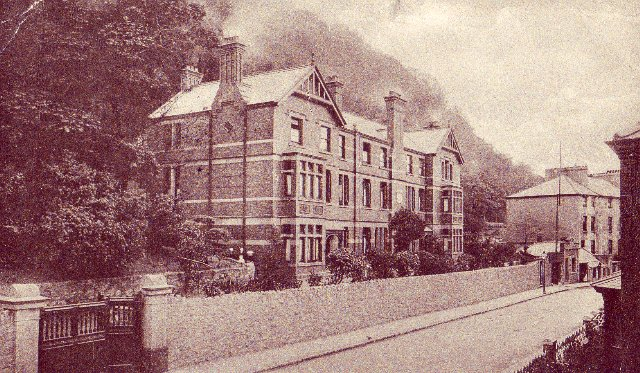
St Winifred's, Bron Castell, Bangor

The oldest of her parents’ four children, Mitchell had twin sisters, Edith and Gertrude, and a brother, Edward Pease Houghton Mitchell. She was educated away from home at St Winifred's, a boarding school for girls in Bangor, North Wales, and at Bedford College, London.

Mitchell's brother Edward passed out of Sandhurst in 1916 and died near the end of the First World War, while serving as a Second Lieutenant in the Royal Air Force. Her mother died in 1935, leaving some £5,500, and her father in 1946.

== Career ==
Soon after the end of the First World War, Mitchell, an aspiring writer, was living in London and was a member of a circle of anarchists. She later recalled an evening on a rooftop talking of Marx, Hegelian dialectic, communalism, and the future of Ireland, and commented on it "Better in youth the endless talk, even the “isms” that show the divine discontent, than the young who do not question and who never rebel."

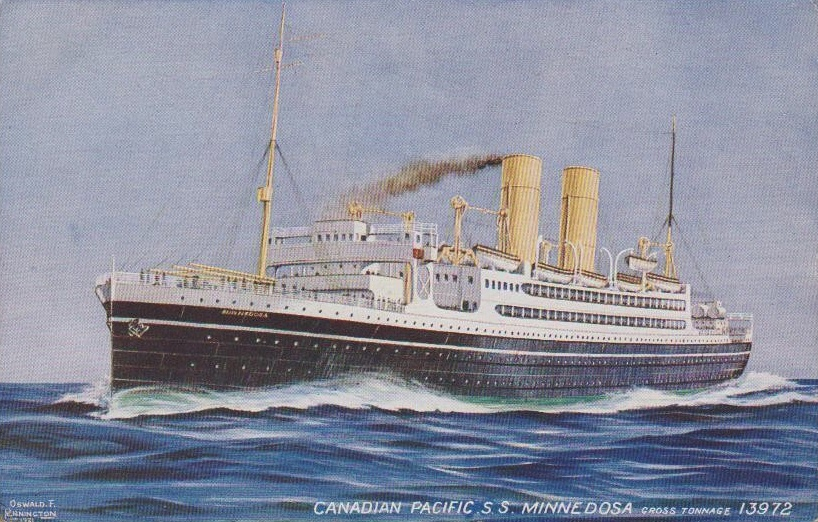
SS Minnedosa in 1921

On a whim, Mitchell took a job as a ship's stenographer on the Canadian Pacific liner SS Minnedosa, which took her to Canada. There, she was initiated into the Iroquois at Kahnawake, before returning to England with Minnedosa. She did further work for Canadian Pacific.

Mitchell became a journalist and London correspondent for Irish newspapers. She also wrote poems and books, choosing to use the Irish form of her first name. In a copy of her A Shuiler Sings (1932) she wrote an inscription in Irish and signed her name as "Máirín Ní Mhaol Mhicheil".

In the 1930s, Mitchell was corresponding with Hanna Sheehy-Skeffington about arrangements for meetings of the Women Writers’ Club and the Roger Casement Committee, and about other matters, such as infiltration of the political system in the Irish Free State by fascist and reactionary ideas. The two met many times, and in 1946 Mitchell wrote an obituary of Sheehy-Skeffington for the Connolly Association’s Irish Democrat, concluding that "... her loss to the London-Irish is as great as that to those at home."

In 1935, Mitchell’s book Traveller in Time, set in Ireland in 1942, explores a fantastic development of the age of television in the context of Irish history. Colm MacColgan, her traveller, uses his invention of "Tempevision" to tune in to events at different times and places in the past, observing the impacts of the Irish around Europe and beyond. A glowing review of the work in An Gaedheal reported that Mitchell was one of the most enthusiastic members of the Gaelic League in London and urged its readers "GAELS, read this book!" In the same year, Mitchell wrote of a visit to Budapest in "An Irishwoman in Hungary".

While he was writing Homage to Catalonia, George Orwell reviewed Mitchell's Storm over Spain (1937) for Time and Tide and commended its well-informed analysis, adding that it was "written by a Catholic, but very sympathetic to the Spanish Anarchists". Mitchell wrote to Orwell to thank him for his review but added that she had read The Road to Wigan Pier, and in politics they were on different sides. She also stated that she was Irish, rather than English, as he had supposed. Fredric Warburg, the publisher of Storm Over Spain, later wrote that the book had been "a flop", but added that it was "the only pacifist study I ever read of the Spanish War".

In 1939, Mitchell was highly critical of the Irish leftists for their views on the Molotov–Ribbentrop Pact and wrote to Desmond Ryan in September "Brian O'Neill, Bloomsbury, and Daiken will sing Russia right or wrong."

From 1937 to 1939 Mitchell travelled in Europe, visiting France, Germany, Italy, Switzerland, Scandinavia, and Liechtenstein, and her Back to England (1940) describes her travels and adds her thoughts on conditions in Britain in 1940. It was later republished by the Right Book Club as its book of the month. In Liechtenstein in 1937 she gave the head of government a copy of the new Constitution of Ireland. Martin Tyrrell has described Mitchell's political views as being similar to the distributism associated with Hilaire Belloc and G. K. Chesterton.

During the Second World War, Mitchell worked in sea ports as an interpreter.

In April 1940, an article appeared in Irish Freedom under Mitchell's name, praising Betsy Gray and urging Irish women to follow her example and support the Irish Republican and Labour movement. In the next month's issue, an apology was printed which made it clear that Mitchell had not written the article and that her name had been printed in error.

Mitchell's Atlantic Battle and the Future of Ireland (1941) was written while she was serving at sea. In this, Mitchell described herself as a British citizen of Irish parentage. She praised de Valera and his policy of neutrality, but foresaw great impacts on Ireland from the outcome of the war in the Atlantic. She wished to see "a Federation of the British and American Commonwealths", based on sea power, and an end to the partition of Ireland, with a reunited Ireland joining an Atlantic alliance with Britain and the United States.

By 1946, Mitchell was elected a Fellow of the Royal Geographical Society and she also became a contributor to Encyclopædia Britannica.

Of Mitchell's The Maritime History of Russia 848–1948 (1949), the Naval Review said "This is history in unusual form, if form it is, or indeed if history it is. The author holds firmly to the central idea that Russia has, mainly from the time of Peter the Great, been forcing her way outwards to become an oceanic animal as well as a land animal." The book was also published in French and Turkish.

In November 1953, The London Gazette recorded Miss Marian Houghton Mitchell as the personal representative of James Garrett Peacocke, deceased, retired merchant seaman, of Walworth, who had died in September of that year.

After the Second World War, Mitchell lived for long periods in Tolosa and Zumaia in the Basque Country and became a friend of leading Basques, including José de Arteche, Koldo Mitxelena, and Manuel de Irujo. She relied largely on work by Arteche for her two biographies of Basques on Pacific voyages of discovery, Juan Sebastián Elcano and Andrés de Urdaneta. Of her Elcano the First Circumnavigator (1958) the British Book News said that while written for the general reader, it was the result of wide reading and research in Spanish archives. Her Friar Andrés de Urdaneta, O.S.A. did not appear until 1964. Meanwhile, her The Bridge of San Miguel (1960) was a fictionalized account of the first European sighting of the Pacific Ocean by Vasco Nunez de Balboa in 1513, with a map of the Isthmus of Panama showing the route taken by Balboa. Her last book, published in 1986, was a study of Berengaria of Navarre, the Basque queen of Richard I of England.

In 1960, Mitchell moved from Highgate Avenue, London N6, to Claygate in Surrey. In 1981, she was living at Dawes House, Burwash, East Sussex, and died at Holy Cross Priory, Cross-in-Hand, on 5 October 1986, aged 91. She was cremated in Kent on 10 October.

== Commemoration ==
Running from March 2022 to February 2023, a Mairin Mitchell exhibition was arranged by the Biscay Provincial Council at the Basque Country Museum in Guernica, curated by Xabier Armendariz, to celebrate Mitchell’s influence in the Basque Country. In reporting on it, the Irish Examiner noted that Mitchell was "honoured abroad but unknown at home".

== Selected works ==
Books

- Songs of the South, The Hidden Land, Pedlar’s Pieces, Road Rhymes (verse)
- A Shuiler Sings (London: M. Michael, The Columbia Press, 1932), a collection of short poems dealing with Ireland.
- Traveller in Time (London: Sheed & Ward, 1935)
- Storm over Spain (London: Secker & Warburg, 1937)
- Atlantic Battle and the Future of Ireland (London: F. Muller Ltd. 1941)
- Back to England: an Account of the Author's Travels on the Continent from 1937 to 1939 and Her Observations on Wartime Conditions in Britain in 1940 (London: Frederick Muller, 1941; London: Right Book Club, 1942)
- The Red Fleet and the Royal Navy (London: Hodder & Stoughton, 1942)
- We Can Keep the Peace (London: Grout Publishing Co., 1945)
- The Maritime History of Russia 848–1948 (London: Sidgwick & Jackson, 1949 ASIN B0006D95RU)
- The Odyssey of Acurio who sailed with Magellan (London: Heinemann, 1956); also published in German as Die Odyssee des Juan de Acurio: der Roman der ersten Weltanschauung (Wiesbaden: Rheinische Verlagsanstalt)
- Elcano the First Circumnavigator (London: Herder, 1958)
- The Bridge of San Miguel (London: Herder, 1960, ASIN B0000CKV0C)
- Friar Andrés de Urdaneta, O.S.A. (1508–1568) Pioneer of Pacific Navigation from West to East (London: Macdonald and Evans, 1964)
- Berengaria: Enigmatic Queen of England (Burwash Weald, East Sussex: A. Wright, 1986, ISBN 0951181505)

Articles

- "Catalonia and her People", The Irish Press, 17 October 1934, p. 6
- "An Irishwoman in Hungary", The Irish Press, 21 September 1935
- "Eire of the Swift Ships", in Irish Freedom No. 50, February 1943
- "A Great Irishwoman", tribute to Hanna Sheehy-Skeffington in The Irish Democrat No. 19, July 1946, p. 5
- "Ferdinand Magellan, Portuguese explorer", in Encyclopædia Britannica

== Translations ==
- José de Arteche, The Cardinal of Africa, Charles Lavigerie, Founder of the White Fathers translated by Mairin Mitchell (London: Sands & Co., 1964; Catholic Book Club, 1964)
- Fray Maria Pablo Garcia Gorriz, The Visigothic Basilica of San Juan De Banos and Visigothic Art, English version by Mairin Mitchell (Diario-Dia, 1973, ASIN B00A0N101U) a study of the Church of San Juan Bautista, Baños de Cerrato
- Mairin Mitchell, Histoire maritime de la Russie (Paris: Editions Deux Rives, 1952), translated into French by René Jouan
- Mairin Mitchell, Die Odyssee des Juan de Acurio: Der Roman d. ersten Weltumseglung (Wiesbaden: Rheinische Verlags-Anstalt, 1958), translated into German by Margaretha von Reischach-Scheffel
- Mairin Mitchell, Rusyanın denizcilik tarihi (Istanbul: Deniz Basımevi, 1974), The Maritime History of Russia translated into Turkish by Sermet Gökdeniz

== As editor ==
- José Luis Martín Descalzo, A Priest Confesses, translated into English by Rita Goldberg, ed. Mairin Mitchell (The Catholic Book Club, 1962)
