= Cross-in-Hand =

Village in East Sussex, England

Coordinates: 50.97356°N 0.22355°E

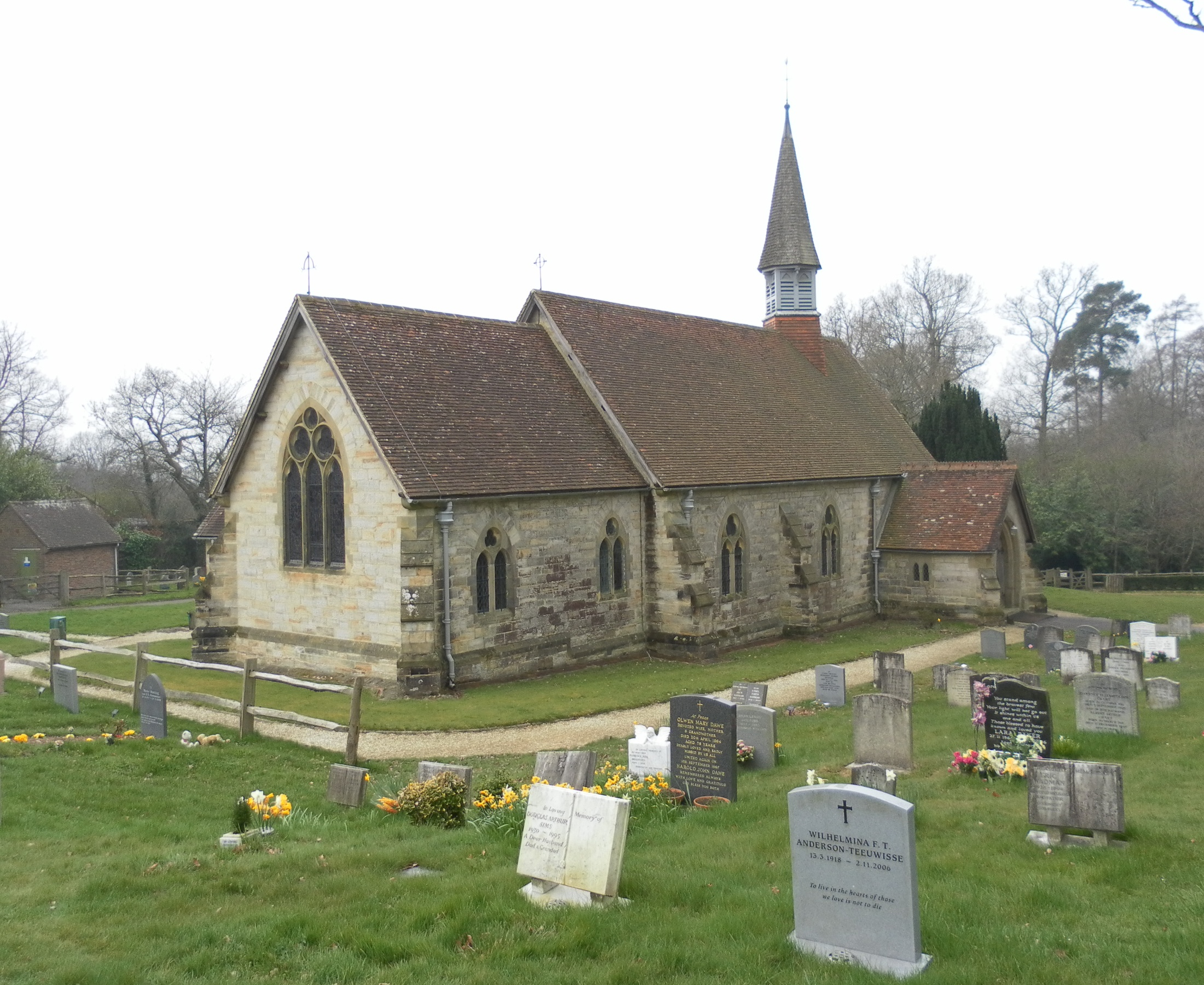
- St Bartholomew's Church

- Location within East Sussex
- OS grid reference: TQ562216
  - London: 50 miles (80 km) NNW
- Civil parish: Heathfield and Waldron
- District: Wealden
- Shire county: East Sussex
- Region: South East
- Country: England
- Sovereign state: United Kingdom
- Post town: HEATHFIELD
- Postcode district: TN21
- Dialling code: 01435
- Police: Sussex
- Fire: East Sussex
- Ambulance: South East Coast
- UK Parliament: Bexhill and Battle

Cross-in-Hand is a small village outside Heathfield town to its west, in the Wealden District situated in East Sussex, England. It is occasionally referred to as Isenhurst.

== The village ==
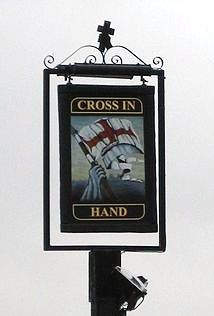
Cross In Hand Inn sign

Cross-in-Hand is situated at the junction the A267 running between Royal Tunbridge Wells and Eastbourne, and the B2102 which terminates in Cross-in-Hand but joins the A22 in Uckfield. It is the easternmost location of the A272 road, which continues west to the A30 in Hampshire. The village has a high street on the B2102 road that links Cross-in-Hand to Uckfield. Retail shops include a petrol station, wooden furniture shops, a motorcycle shop, a bakery, and a funeral director's. The Church of England parish church is dedicated to Saint Bartholomew, and there is one pub, the Cross in Hand.

== Etymology ==
The English Place-Name Society gives the earliest reference to the village as Cruce Manus, the Latin for Cross-in-Hand, recorded in 1547, which by 1597 was being rendered Crosse atte Hand and by 1656 was being called Crosse in the Hande. The name is believed to be based on a legend that Crusaders assembled here before sailing for the Holy Land from Rye to fight Saladin. An alternative explanation is that it is the place where some murderers managed to escape their pursuers by turning to face them with a cross in their hands.

== History ==
The village historically provided services to the iron trade, and a windmill called the "New Mill" has stood at its current site since 1868, although it was built in Framfield in 1855. The reason for this time delay is that the mill was originally placed a quarter of a mile from its current location in its year of construction, and was moved on the command of Louis Huth, a local land owner.

The first Heathfield Agricultural Show was held there in 1946.

== Cross-in-Hand Raceway ==
The village had its own stock car circuit which opened for racing as a dirt track on 17 October 1965, Chichester's Trevor Carpenter winning the final. A second meeting, two weeks later, was cancelled due to bad weather and then the track remained closed until 20 July 1969 when the new concrete track was used for the first time. Neil Thomas of Ashford won all three races that day with Trevor Carpenter winning one of the Superstox heats and Del Stickings winning the final. The track closed after protests from local residents and the last meeting took place on 6 August 1972.

== See also ==
- Holy Cross Priory, Cross-in-Hand
