= Ujelang Atoll =

Coral atoll in the Pacific Ocean

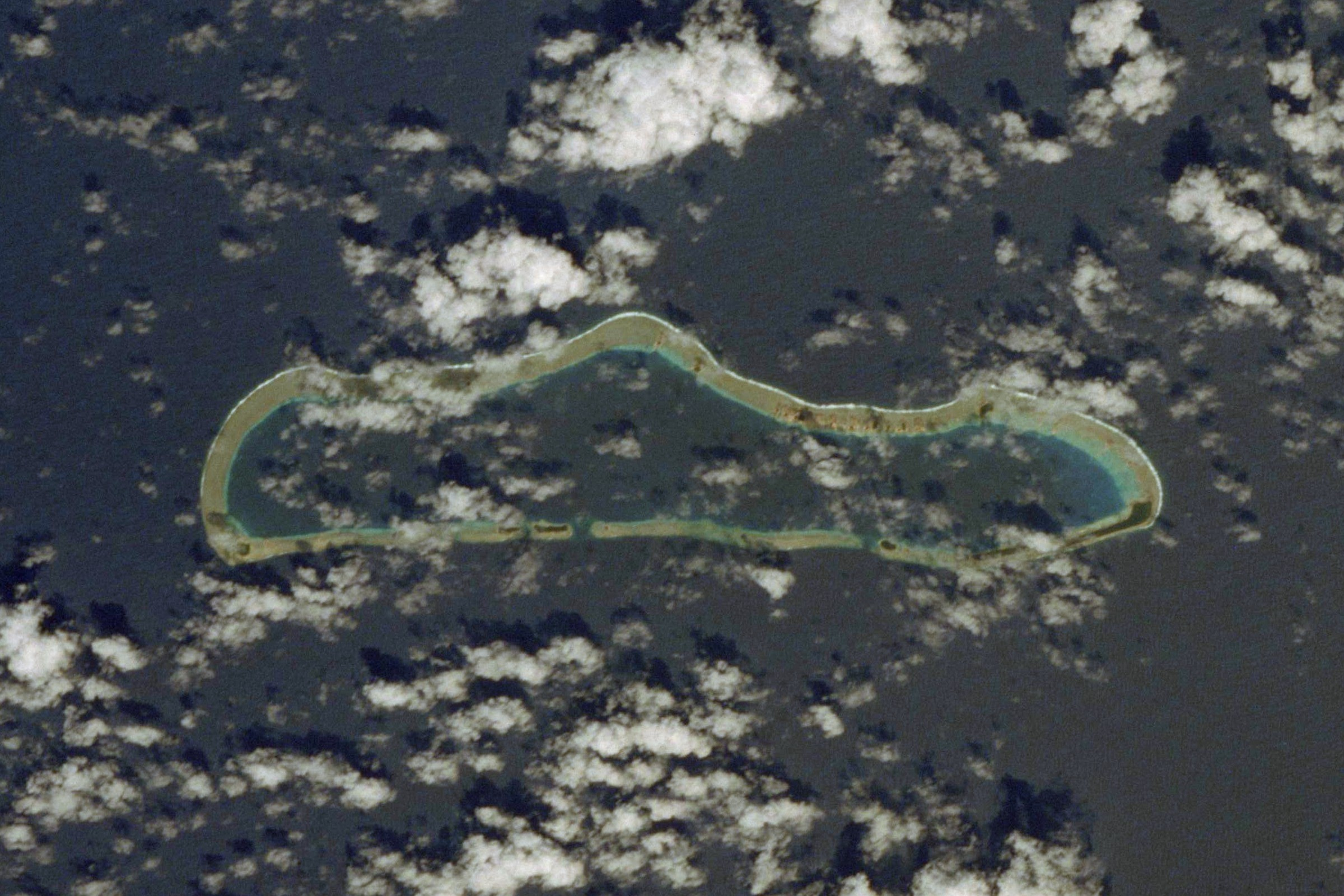
- Ujelang Atoll, taken in space in 1984 during the STS-41-B mission.

- Location within Marshall Islands

Geography
- Location: North Pacific
- Coordinates: 9°49′20″N 160°54′0″E
- Archipelago: Ralik
- Total islands: 30
- Area: 1.86 km^{2} (0.72 sq mi)
- Highest elevation: 3 m (10 ft)

Administration
- Marshall Islands

Demographics
- Population: 0
- Ethnic groups: Marshallese (formerly)

Ujelang Atoll (Marshallese: Wūjlan̄, [wɯzʲ(i)lʲɑŋ]) is an uninhabited coral atoll of 30 islands in the Pacific Ocean, in the Ralik Chain of the Marshall Islands. Its total land area is 1.86 square kilometers (0.72 sq mi), and it encloses a lagoon of 185.94 square kilometers (71.79 sq mi). It is the westernmost island in the Marshall Islands, approximately 217 kilometers (135 mi) southwest of Enewetak, and approximately 600 kilometers (370 mi) west of the main Ralik Chain.

== History ==
Ujelang's first European visitor was Álvaro de Saavedra on 21 September 1529 shortly before his death, in his second attempt to return from Tidore to New Spain. Sighting of Ujelang was again recorded by the Spanish expeditions of Ruy López de Villalobos on 6 January 1543; of Miguel López de Legazpi on 15 January 1565; and by the mutineers of the San Jeronimo led by the pilot Lope Martín in 1566.

In 1811, the British merchant vessel Providence rediscovered the atoll, and named Ujelang Island Providence Island. Providence had transported convicts from Britain to New South Wales and was on its way to China to pick up a cargo to take back to Britain.

The German Empire claimed Ujelang Atoll along with the rest of the Marshall Islands in 1885. It was the private property of German trading companies from 1880, who maintained copra plantations on the largest island, also called Ujelang. After World War I, the island came under the South Seas Mandate of the Empire of Japan. In 1935 there were only some 40 inhabitants.

During World War II, the island was occupied by the United States Army's Company I, 111th Infantry Regiment, which landed on 22 April 1944 and which used the island as a staging area before redeployment to Peleliu on 1 February 1945. The base was part of the vast Naval Base Marshall Islands.

Following the end of World War II, the island came under the control of the United States as part of the Trust Territory of the Pacific Islands until the independence of the Marshall Islands in 1986. The island became a relocation center for the people of Enewetak Atoll in 1947 (due to atomic tests on that island from 1948 to 1958). The population on Ujelang grew from 145 in 1947 to 342 in 1973, despite near-famine and epidemics, especially in the 1950s, due to the scarce supply of fish and vegetables. The inhabitants wanted to return to Enewetak and a highly publicized meeting was held at Ujelang in 1979 to discuss the issue. The United States government was represented by a variety of personnel, primarily Department of Energy (DOE) and Department of Interior representatives. The DOE's legal counsel was William L. Brown. The meeting gained national attention because the CBS television show 60 Minutes went along and publicized the islanders’ desire to return to Enewetak with an extended film segment that ran several times.

The clean-up of Enewetak was essentially done except for several areas which were declared unsafe for human habitation until 2010. Hundreds of new coconut trees were planted and vast amounts of sediment and other material contaminated by radioactivity were entombed under a giant concrete dome. The next year, in 1980, all Ujelang inhabitants were returned to Enewetak. A hundred or so soon returned to Ujelang because Enewetak could not support so many people, but their stay on Ujelang was short-lived. In 1989 Ujelang became permanently uninhabited. Ujelang Atoll is currently owned by the Enewetak Council and is now very rarely visited.

== See also ==
- Desert island
- List of islands
- Ujlān volcanic complex
