= Holy Cross Priory, Cross-in-Hand =

Building in East Sussex, England

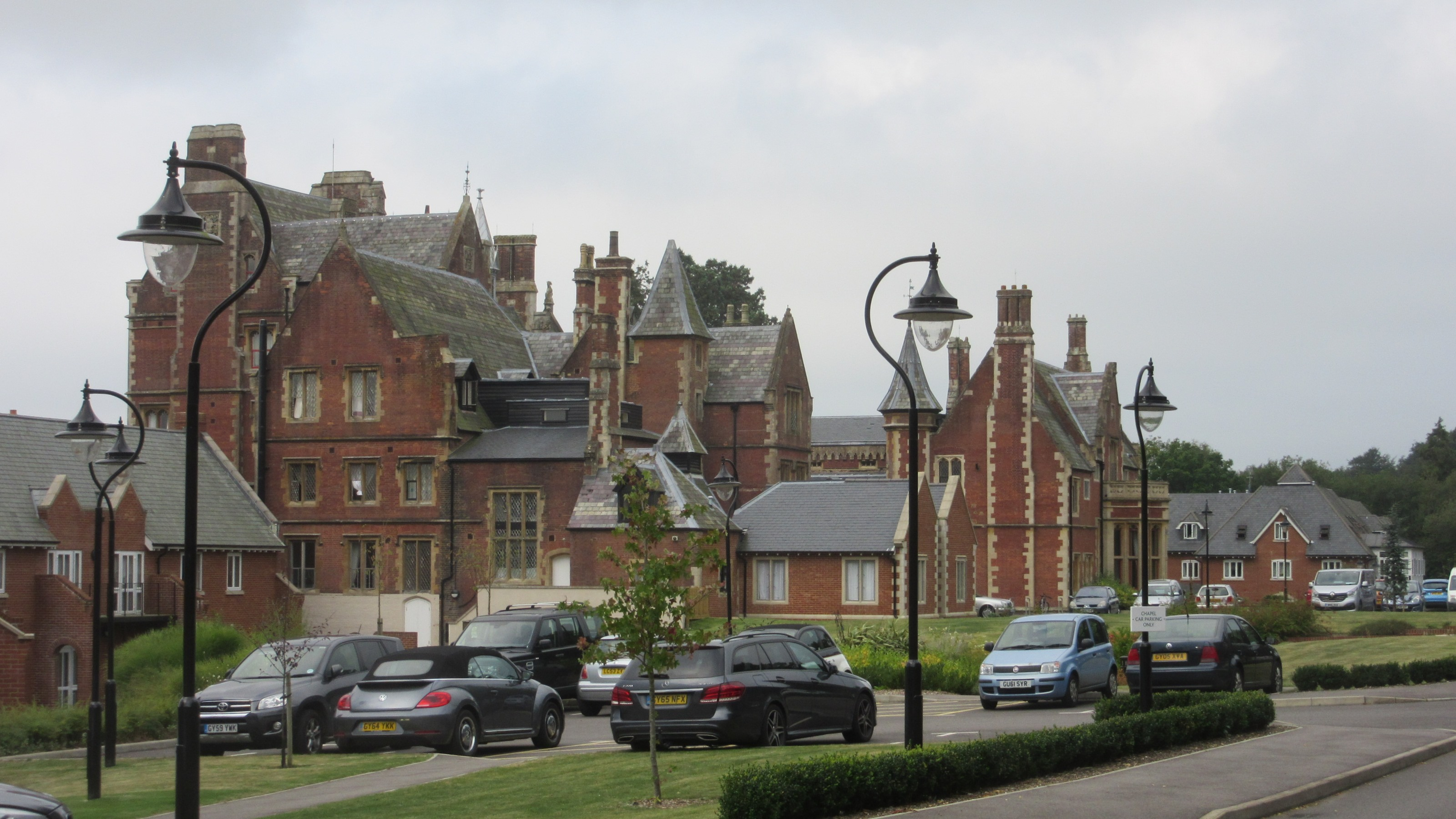
- The Priory in 2016

- Location within East Sussex
- Interactive map of Holy Cross Priory, Cross-in-Hand

Monastery information
- Order: Benedictine Sisters of Grace and Compassion
- Established: 1964
- Dedication: The Holy Cross
- Diocese: Arundel and Brighton

Site
- Location: East Sussex, England
- Coordinates: 50.9715°N 0.1995°E

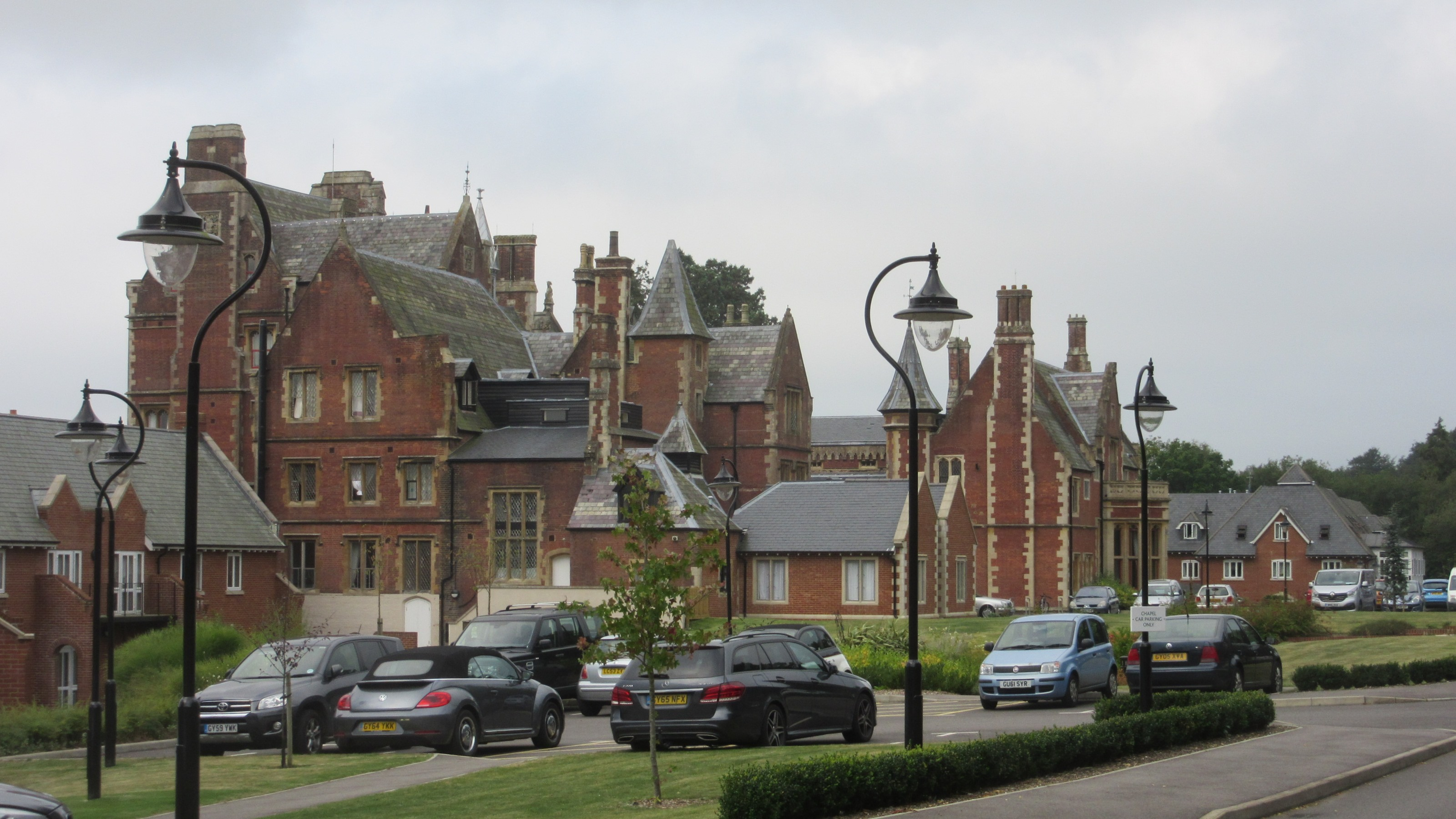
The priory in 2016

Holy Cross Priory, Cross-in-Hand, is a priory of the Benedictine Sisters of Grace and Compassion which provides homes for the elderly. It was established in 1964 at a large country house in Cross-in-Hand, East Sussex previously known as Possingworth Park, which was renamed as Holy Cross Priory.

It now provides supported living and a residential care home.

== The manor ==
In the Middle Ages the manor of Possingworth was within the Forest of Anderida. Between 1334 and the Dissolution of the monasteries in 1556 the manor belonged to Robertsbridge Abbey. It was then sold, and in 1635 Sir Humphrey Offley was the first to build a manor house at Possingworth. This survives less than a mile from the present house.

In 1864, the manor of Possingworth was sold to Louis Huth, a merchant banker.

== History of the house ==
Huth built a new country house at Possingworth, designed by Matthew Digby Wyatt at a cost of £60,000, which was completed in 1866. Ornate neo-Gothic, and U-shaped, it is built of red brick and York stone, with a slate roof. As built, the new house had several oak-panelled reception rooms, including a large picture gallery for Huth's art collection, 42 bedrooms, and a conservatory. Huth employed Robert Marnock to lay out the park and garden.

Possingworth Park was used as a convalescent home for soldiers during the First World War. In the 1920s, it became the Possingworth Park Hotel, and in the Second World War was used by the Canadian Army. In 1944, two V-1 flying bombs landed in the grounds and the impact from one of them destroyed the conservatory, called the Winter Garden.

Beginning in 1946, much of the grounds of the Possingworth Park Hotel were built on. In the 1950s the main house and its garden were bought by Augustinian monks for a training school for the priesthood. In 1964 it was sold to House of Hospitality Ltd, for the use of the Benedictine Sisters of Grace and Compassion. They renamed the property as Holy Cross Priory and created a home for the elderly.

House of Hospitality Ltd was a charitable organization registered with the Charity Commissioners. Its stated objects were “to alleviate need and distress amongst persons of both sexes (especially Roman Catholics) by providing homes, nursing and medical treatment; and to establish, equip, staff and maintain schools for the education of persons of both sexes (especially Roman Catholics)”.

== Present day ==
Now providing supported living, with nursing care when needed, Holy Cross Priory has a separate care home in its grounds, providing long-term and short-term nursing care and respite care, inspired by the ethos of the Sisters of Grace and Compassion, who continue to own the property.

== Notable residents ==
Mairin Mitchell (1895–1986), a Roman Catholic author, spent her final years living at Holy Cross Priory.
