= Providence (1807 ship) =

Merchant ship built at Calcutta, India

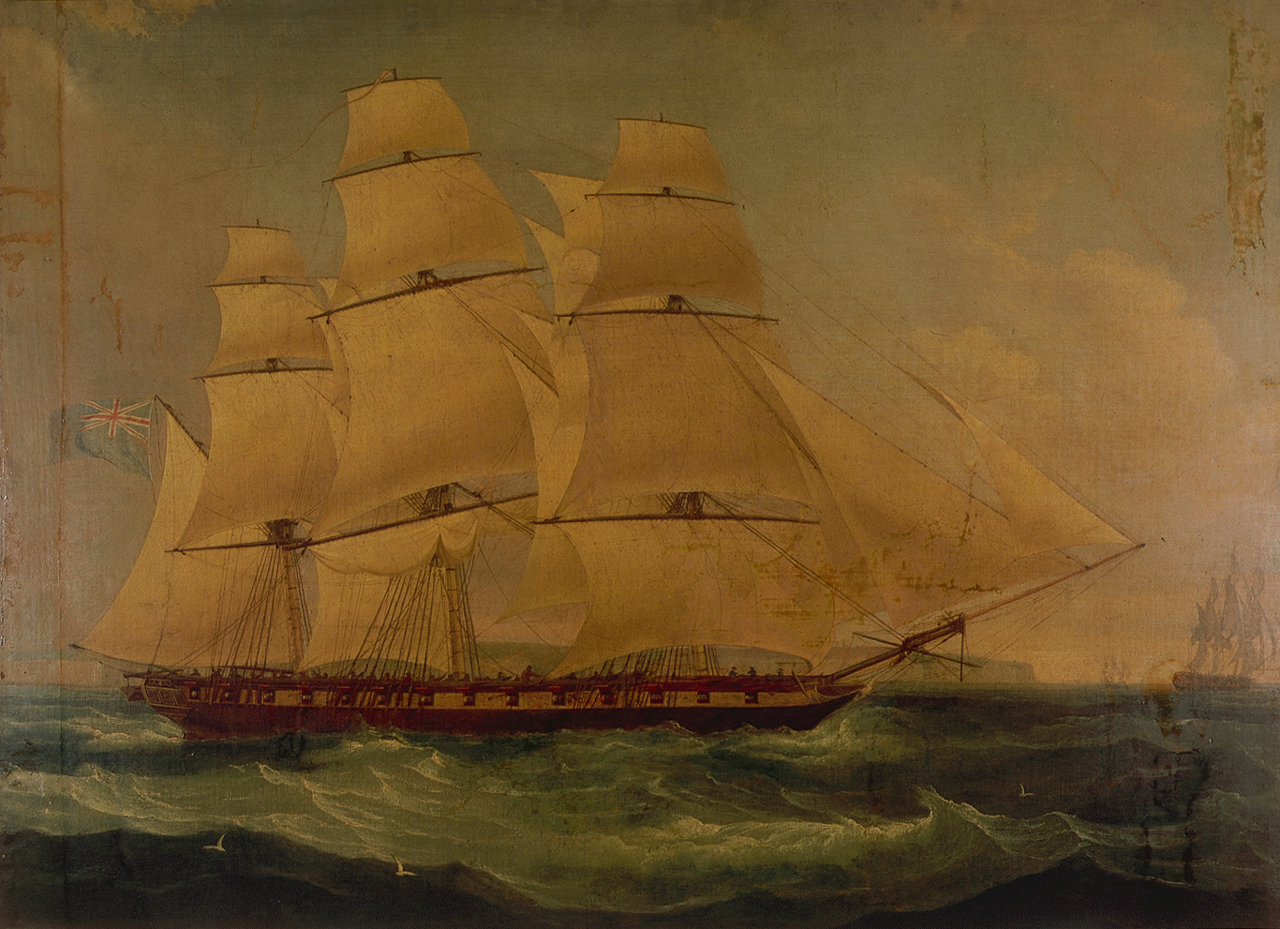
- East Indiaman Providence, Thomas Whitcombe, National Maritime Museum, Greenwich

History

United Kingdom
- Name: Providence
- Owner: EIC Voyage #1:H. Reid; EIC Voyage #2: Andrew Barclay; EIC Voyage #3: Almon Hill; EIC Voyage #4: Reed, or George Bunyun
- Builder: Matthew Smith & Hugh Reid, Howrah, Calcutta
- Launched: 2 June 1807 (Note: Hackman states that Providence was launched on 23 May 1800. However, two independent, contemporary sources give a launch year of 1807. Also Phipps gives a year of 1807.)
- Fate: Stranded and scuttled at Scilly in 1833

General characteristics
- Tons burthen: 6211/94, 630, 649, or 655 or 678(bm)
- Length: 127 ft 10 1/2 in (39.0 m) (overall); 101 ft 10 in (31.0 m) (keel)
- Beam: 34 ft 1 1/2 in (10.4 m)
- Depth of hold: 18 ft 3 in (5.6 m)
- Propulsion: Sail
- Complement: 50
- Armament: 1810:14 guns (Note: The report of the letter states that Providence carried 14 guns, comprising 14, 18, and 19-pounders. There must be some transcription error as there were no 14 or 19-pounder guns.); 1811:6 × 18 + 12 × 9-pounder guns
- Notes: Teak-built

Providence was a merchant ship built at Calcutta, India, and launched in 1807. She made four voyages for the British East India Company (EIC), on one of which she delivered convicts to New South Wales. The ship was scuttled at St Martin's, Isles of Scilly in 1833 after grounding while on a voyage from London to Bombay, India.

== EIC voyage #1 (1809-1810) ==
Captain Hugh Reid sailed Providence from Bengal to Britain, leaving Calcutta on 18 June 1809, resting at Diamond Harbour on 23 June, passing Saugor on 25 July, and reaching Madras on 24 September. Providence then reached the Cape on 25 December and St Helena on 27 January 1810, before arriving at the Downs on 16 April. Reid sold Providence in England. A supplement to Lloyd's Register for 1810 shows the master changing to Barclay, and the next Lloyd's Register shows her owner as Barclay. Providence was admitted to the Registry of Great Britain on 9 July 1810.

== EIC voyage #2 (1810-12) ==
Captain Andrew Barclay left Portsmouth on 7 September 1810, bound for New South Wales and China. She sailed under a letter of marque issued to Barclay on 19 July 1810. The letter authorized Barclay to engage in offensive action against French vessels, not just defensive, should the opportunity arise.

Providence arrived at Cork on 12 September. She then backtracked to Falmouth, where she arrived on 23 December. She left Falmouth on 21 January 1811 with 140 male and 41 female convicts. The 73rd Regiment of Foot provided three officers and 42 other ranks, though two soldiers deserted at Cobh, and two were left at the hospital there, of whom one died. On the voyage, three died and one was missing, believed drowned. One private joined at Rio. There were a number of free settlers as well, at least three men, seven women, and six children, one of whom died at Cobh. The crew numbered 56, all but eleven of whom where Spaniards or lascars.

Providence sailed in company with HMS Narcissus, which parted at Tenerife. Providence then reached Rio de Janeiro on 23 March. She stayed there for three weeks, departing on 13 April. She arrived at Port Jackson on 2 July, but did not actually anchor until 6 July. Four male and three female convicts had died on the voyage.

Providence left Port Jackson on 20 October bound for China. She took with her some officers and soldiers of the 102nd Regiment of Foot who had been permitted to stay due to illness or leave when the Regiment had been recalled to Britain.

On her way to China Providence rediscovered the Ujelang Atoll at (9°49′N 160°55′E), and named Ujelang Island Providence Island.

She arrived at Whampoa anchorage on 16 December. Homeward bound, she crossed the Second Bar on 3 February 1812 and reached Simons Bay on 24 April. She reached St Helena on 10 June and Falmouth on 4 September, before arriving at the Downs on 15 September.

== EIC voyage #3 (1816-17) ==
In 1815 Providence underwent repairs. For her third voyage, her owner was Almon Hill. (Note: Hackman has this voyage for the EIC, but not the previous two. He also gives the master's name as Andrew Timbrell rather than Andrew Timbrell Mason.)

Captain Andrew Timbrell Mason left the downs on 24 March 1816, bound for St Helena and China. Providence reached st Helena on 10 June, Batavia on 30 September, and Samarang on 4 November, arriving at Whampoa on 7 January 1817. Homeward bound, she crossed the Second Bar on 28 February, reached St Helena on 7 June, and arrived at the Downs on 30 July.

== EIC Voyage #4 (1820-21) ==
Lloyd's Register for 1820 gives the name of Providence's owner as A. Hill, her master as J. Hill, and her trade as London-India. A later addendum to the entry gives the name of a new master, Adair. In 1820 her owners sold Providence to E. Reed, London.

Captain John Adair left the Downs on 19 July 1820, bound for Bengal and Madras. Providence reached the Cape on 20 October, and arrived at Calcutta on 10 January 1821. She was at Saugor on 13 March, reached Vizagapatam on 5 April, and arrived at Madras on 19 April. She reached the Cape on 8 July and St Helena on 2 August, before arriving at the Downs on 26 September.

== Later career ==
Register of Shipping

Year	Master	Owner	Trade
1822	Adams; Owen	M'Taggart; Reed	London—India; London—Madras
1825	Remington	Reed	London—Madras
1830	Ford	Reed	London—Calcutta

A report dated Bengal, 2 June, reported that a 'norwester' had driven Providence, Remington, master, on shore near Chandpunt Gant. The Harbour Master's department had immediately rendered assistance. She had grounded near the high-water mark, but on the next flood she was hove off without much damage.

A report dated Calcutta, 12 June 1824, reported that Providence, Remington, master, had gone on shore but had been gotten off on the next tide, apparently without damage. She was to go into dock for inspection. These appear, from the dates, to be the same incident.

== Fate ==
In 1833 Providence stranded. She was so damaged that she was sold for breaking up. Captain Campbell was sailing Providence between London and Bombay when she was reported to have come into Scilly damaged. She then discharged her cargo there. She was next reported to have been driven from her anchors and scuttled. Subsequent reports had her still on a bar, or come into Dartmouth. The last reports have her cargo having been put on the New Grove at Scilly, and a Providence being sunk there.
