= Seán O'Hegarty =

IRA member (1881–1963)

- Born: March 21, 1881
- Died: May 31, 1963 (aged 82)
- Military career
- Allegiance: Irish Republic
- Branch: Irish Volunteers
- Conflicts: Easter Rising; Irish War of Independence

Seán O'Hegarty (21 March 1881 – 31 May 1963) was a prominent member of the Irish Republican Army in County Cork during the Irish War of Independence. He served as O/C of the Cork No. 1 Brigade of the IRA after the deaths of Tomás Mac Curtain and Terence MacSwiney.

== Biography ==
=== Early life ===
Born in Cork on 21 March 1881, O'Hegarty came from a family with strong nationalist roots. His parents were John, a plasterer and stucco worker and Katherine (née Hallahan) Hegarty. His elder brother was writer Patrick Sarsfield O'Hegarty.

His parents' families emigrated to the United States after the Great famine, and his parents married in Boston. His father was a member of the IRB. In 1888 his father died of tuberculosis, aged 42, and his mother had to work to support the family.

=== Entering Irish Nationalism ===
O'Hegarty was educated at the CBS North Monastery school in Cork. By 1902, he had left school to work as a sorter in the local post office, rising to post office clerk.

He was a supporter of the Gaelic revival, Irish traditional music, and Gaelic games. A committed sportsman, in his twenties he was captain of the Post Office HQ's hurling team. He followed his brother Patrick (P. S. O'Hegarty) into the Gaelic League and eventually the Irish Volunteers and the Irish Republican Brotherhood. He was a member of the Celtic Literary Society by 1905 and founded the Growney branch of the Gaelic League in 1907. A puritanical character by nature, he was a non-smoker and never drank.

O'Hegarty was a founder of the local branch of the Irish Volunteers in Cork in December 1913. In June of the following year he was appointed to the Cork section of the Volunteer Executive, and then to the Military Council. In October the Dublin government discovered his illegal activities, so he was dismissed. Excluded from Cork under the DORA regulations, he moved to Ballingeary, where he worked as a labourer. From there he moved to Enniscorthy, County Wexford, where he lived with Larry de Lacy. On 24 February 1915, he was arrested and tried under the Defence of the Realm Act for putting up seditious posters. For this and a second charge of 'possession of explosives' he was discharged. The explosives belonged to de Lacy.

The Volunteers appointed O'Hegarty as commandant of Ballingeary and Bandon. During the Easter Rising he was stationed in Ballingeary when visited by Michael McCarthy of Dunmanway to propose an attack on an RIC post at Macroom. However, their strength was fatally weakened, and having no reserves they called off the attempt.

=== Reorganisation of the Cork IRB and Irish Volunteers after 1916 ===
In 1917, O'Hegarty became vice-commandant of no.1 Cork Brigade.

Within Cork City, membership of the Irish Volunteers and the smaller and Irish Republican Brotherhood (IRB) overlapped but seniority differed in each. While Tómas Mac Curtain was commandant of the Irish Volunteers in Cork, he had resigned from the IRB following 1916. During 1917, a period when the Volunteers were expanding rapidly, O'Hegarty was both second in command of the Irish Volunteers, and leader of the IRB in the City.

In the years following 1916, divisions emerged within the separatist movement over strategy and organisation. Debate centred on whether to prioritise open political organising and membership expansion, restructuring the movement to support a sustained mass campaign, or to retain a clandestine role for the Irish Republican Brotherhood, including the timing and desirability of limited early attacks on the Royal Irish Constabulary. O'Hegarty was often in favour of the use of force at an early stage when it was against Irish Volunteer orders. He led a group of men who were both members of the IRB and members of the Volunteers, and he approved of their actively raiding to obtain arms, preparing explosives and attacks on RIC men. Mac Curtain did not at this time approve of some such incidents. Incidents could trigger disruptive RIC raids and he viewed them as inappropriate in some cases. Incidents were taking place in Cork which were not authorised by the most senior Volunteer leadership, by men associated with O'Hegarty and the Cork IRB.

In September 1917, IRB men led by Roibard Langford carried out the Cork Grammar School raid and captured 47 badly needed service rifles. Langford faced a Volunteer court martial, but was acquitted.

In November 1918 O'Hegarty was acting commandant of the Cork Brigade, Mac Curtain having fallen ill while at a Volunteer meeting in Dublin. Captain Donnchadh Mac Neilus, another of his IRB/Volunteer men, who had shot an RIC head constable while resisting arrest, was being held in Cork Mens Gaol. There were fears that Mac Neilus would be executed if the head constable died, so O'Hegarty decided to attempt a rescue despite the gaol being guarded by the military. O'Hegarty approved the rescue plan created by Florence O'Donoghue. This was the first major armed operation since 1916, with Volunteers and Cumman na mBan involved guarding the gaol and approach roads, cutting telegraph lines, preparing the escape route and attending a first aid station to await any casualties. No shots were fired, and the plan was successfully carried out on 11 November. Six armed IRB/Irish Volunteer men entered the Gaol, subdued the guards and departed with the rescued prisoner.

The separation of leadership between Volunteers and IRB came to a head in April 1919, when an attempt was made to arrest an IRB man (Harry Varian) who had shot and seriously wounded a member of the RIC and evaded arrest. The wounded RIC man incorrectly identified Fred Murray, a Volunteer officer, as being responsible, and he was arrested for the shooting. Varian later explained his actions by saying that O'Hegarty had granted him permission to carry a gun, and he did not believe he should apologise for using it.

In May 1919 a house which was used by O'Hegarty's IRB group blew up while explosives were being prepared. Two IRB men, who were also Volunteers, were killed. Mac Curtain had not previously been informed.

The various incidents where IRB leadership instructions conflicted with Irish Volunteer leadership instructions resulted in some disagreements among the leadership. As a gesture to Mac Curtain's seniority within the Volunteers, in 1919 O'Hegarty resigned as second in command of the Cork Brigade, but remained a Volunteer. He continued to be leader of the IRB in the City.

=== War of Independence ===
During the War of Independence, O'Hegarty was one of the most active in County Cork.

When an off duty RIC constable was murdered, Mac Curtain condemned the unauthorised shootings and called for their end. On 19 March 1920, Mac Curtain was shot and killed in his own home in Cork. The coroner blamed the British establishment in Dublin, but the police never made any attempt to investigate the killings. Shortly after these events General Tudor began the policy of Official Reprisals.

In a raid on Cork City Hall on 12 August 1920, the British managed to net all the top brass of the IRA in Cork. In an incredible failure of intelligence they did not identify the leadership as their prisoners. They were all released, including Liam Lynch, and O'Hegarty. Only Terence MacSwiney, the new lord mayor, was kept in custody and sent to England. By 1921 O'Hegarty was commandant of Cork No.1 Brigade.

On 25 February 1921 the Coolavokig Ambush was carried out by the 1st Cork Brigade under O'Hegarty at Ballyvourney village (on the road between Macroom and Ballyvourney). The IRA later reported they had 56 armed men. The Auxiliaries reported that their force initially consisted of two officers and 39 men, plus seven RIC, with a district inspector and another 25 other ranks arriving later as reinforcements. The IRA suffered no casualties. However, the number of British casualties has been disputed to this day. Those killed included the commander of the Auxiliaries, and two other ranks. Newspaper reports indicate at least 5 were wounded.

The brigade commanders in the southern division retained a residual lingering resentment for Dublin GHQ's lack of leadership and supplies. Sean Moylan, commandant of No.2 Cork bde, thought good communications with No.1 bde were to be vital, but little of this was seen via the organizer Ernie O'Malley at GHQ. At a meeting set up for 26 April 1921, when the manual of Infantry Training 1914 and instructions from GHQ were produced, they raised great anger. The Southern Division men were not paid and only had shotguns or arms they captured, so felt the training, military service periods and military proposals presented by GHQ were inapplicable. The meeting ended in uproar, when a number objected, including O'Hegarty who as "a master of invective, tore the communication and its authors to ribbons".

O'Malley and Liam Lynch, the general, met with O'Hegarty in the mountains of West Cork, near a deserted farmhouse, just off the main road. In On Another Man's Wound, O'Hegarty is described as wearing "a light-blue swallow-tail coat, and trousers, a heavy woollen coat, derby hat, with a twisted stick under his arm...he was bearded, mutton-chop whiskers." In the retreat that followed, the Irish lost heavy casualties, and left their wounded to the good care of the British. These were the "round-ups" in which the Irish slept outside in order to avoid being at home when the Army called. They were told by Brigade to learn the English national anthem to avoid arrest.

In East Cork brigade O'Hegarty uncovered a spy ring. When the 6th Battalion proposed executing Mrs Georgina Lindsay and her chauffeur, after they informed the British Army of an IRA flying column ambush position in Dripsey, resulting in the encirclement of the column and the execution or death of 6 Volunteers, O'Hegarty said he would support the decision the battalion came to in spite of Michael Collins initially being reluctant to execute a woman. GHQ were not informed of the execution until it was raised during negotiation of the treaty and they insisted on a clear answer.

O'Hegarty became more and more aggressive towards the establishment, using tough language to impose his will over the area. He attempted to force the civilian TDs for Cork to stand down, to give way to military candidates, telling the Dáil in December 1921 that any TD voting for the treaty would be guilty of treason. However, De Valera was decided, and overruled any interference with the Civil Government. Like the commanders, he rejected the treaty, but had already been defeated in the Dáil on a vote by Cosgrave's majority.

On 1 February 1922, O'Hegarty married Maghdalen Ni Laoghaire (d.1940), a prominent member of Cumann na mBan.

=== During the Civil War ===
O'Hegarty was on the IRA's Executive Council, but when there was a meeting on 9 April 1922, it was proposed that the Army should oppose the elections by force: as a result, Florence O'Donoghue and Tom Hales joined O'Hegarty in resigning. In May, Hegarty and Dan Breen entered into negotiations with Free Stater Dick Mulcahy. A statement was published in the Press asking for unity and acceptance of the treaty.

He was permitted to address the Dáil on 3 May 1922, after the meeting with Collins and Mulcahy in an effort to bring the side together: "...I will say that there is no blame to be put on one side or the other but upon both for this, and it was only when I realised that it was impossible for the leaders themselves to come to any agreement or, in fact, as I believed, to meet on any basis that I as a humble individual endeavoured to do what I could."

He went on to speak strongly to discourage conflict between the pro- and anti-treaty sides:

"...What does civil war mean? To my mind it means not alone that you do not maintain the Republic but that you break for ever any idea of it, that you break the country so utterly and leave it in such a way that England simply walks in and has her way as she never had it before. You will leave a print on Ireland and a print in every man's mind that can never be removed; you break the country utterly and destroy any idea of a Republic."

During this time the Republicans became very demoralized and ill-disciplined. However, they had to gain strength before announcing independence from Dublin. The debate amongst the anti-treaty IRA command was increasingly rancorous.

The bitter divisions split the anti-treatyites into two camps. Two motions were debated at the Army Convention on 18 June 1922. At first the motion to oppose the treaty by force was passed. These men included Tom Barry, Liam Mellows, and Rory O'Connor, who were all in favour of continuing the fight until the British were driven out of Ireland altogether. One brigade's votes had to be recounted, and then the motion was narrowly defeated. Joe McKelvey was appointed the new chief of staff, but the IRA was in chaos. While he strongly opposed the Anglo-Irish Treaty, O'Hegarty took a neutral role in the Irish Civil War and tried to avert hostilities breaking out into full-scale civil war. He emerged as a leader of the 'Neutral IRA' with O'Donoghue. This was a 'loose' confederation of 20,000 men who had taken part in the pre-truce wars, but had remained neutral during the Civil War from January 1923. Over 150 persons attended its convention in Dublin on 4 February 1923. By April 1923, O'Malley was imprisoned in Mountjoy Jail. In a letter to Jim Donovan (Seamus O'Donovan) on 7 April he blamed Hegarty for all this compromise and "peace talk".

== Later life and death ==
Although probably an atheist during the War of Independence, O'Hegarty returned later in life to the Catholic Church. On forming the Neutral Group of the IRA in December 1922, he tried to unify differences in the volunteers between Republicans and the Free Staters. He communicated with the Papal Nuncio during the inter-war years in an attempt to have Bishop Cohalan's excommunication bull lifted, which excommunicated those fighting against the British in 1920. As senior surviving officer of Cork No.1 Brigade, he was chairman of the memorial committee and helped organise the dedication of a cross in St Finbarr's cemetery, where the main Republican plot for Cork is located. After his wife died he became a close friend with Florence O'Donoghue until his own death.

O'Hegarty died on 31 May 1963 at Bon Secours Hospital, Cork.

== Bibliography ==
=== Primary and secondary sources ===
- Barry, Tom, Guerilla Days in Ireland (Dublin 1949, Tralee 1962)
- Barry, Tom, The Reality of the Anglo-Irish War 1920-1 in West Cork (Tralee 1974)
- Borgonovo, John (ed.), Florence and Josephine O'Donoghue's War of Independence. A Destiny that Shapes our Ends (Dublin 2006)
- Girvin, Kevin, Seán O'Hegarty: O/C First Cork Brigade, Irish Republican Army Aubane Historical Society, ISBN 1-903497-30-2.
- Hart, Peter, IRA and its enemies: Violence and Community in Cork (Oxford 1998)
- Hart, Peter, The IRA at War 1916-1923 (Oxford 2003)
- Laffan, Michael, The Partition of Ireland 1911-1925 (Dublin 1983)
- Lynch, Diarmuid, The IRB and the 1916 Insurrection (Cork 1957)
- Maguire, Gloria, 'The Political and Military Causes of the Division in the Irish Nationalist Movement, January 1921 to August 1923', DPhil thesis, Oxford University 1983.
- Murphy, Gerard, The Year of Disappearances: Political Killings in Cork 1921-1922 (Dublin 2010)
- O'Donoghue, Florence, No Other Law (Dublin 1954, 1986)
- O'Malley, Ernie, The Singing Flame (Dublin 1978)
- Ruiseal, Liam, 'The Position in Cork', Capuchin Annual (1966), p. 377-80.
- O'Brien, R Barry, Munster at War (Cork 1971).
