= José de Arteche =

Basque writer

José de Arteche Aramburu (12 March 1906 – 23 September 1971) was a Basque writer and biographer, almost always credited as José de Arteche. The Basque form of his name is Jose Artetxe Aranburu.

Born in Azpeitia, Gipuzkoa, in 1906, Arteche was bilingual in Basque and Spanish. He wrote about the Spanish Civil War and a number of biographies, including lives of Saint Cyran and Lope de Aguirre, a 16th-century Basque conquistador active in South America.

== Early life ==
The child of a Carlist couple who ran the Arteche Inn at Azpeitia, there Arteche met Doña Isabel, the sister of Alfonso XII, Antoine d'Abbadie, a patron of Basque literature, and Benito Pérez Galdós.

Basque was Arteche's mother tongue, and from an early age he was fond of reading. He was educated by French nuns at the Notre Dame school in Azpeitia and then by the Marist Brothers, where he made a friend for life, Inazio Eizmendi Manterola, who also became a writer.

== Career ==
Due to family problems, Arteche had to leave school and got a job in a bank. He soon befriended José de Ariztimuño, a priest who supported Basque literature, later shot by rebels in 1936, and José María Benegas Echeverría, a lawyer and a member of the Basque Nationalist Party (PNV) who fled to Venezuela at the time of the civil war.

In 1931 Arteche married María Gorostegui, with whom he had eight children. His book Canto a Marichu (1970) was dedicated to her. He joined the PNV before 1935, but was a staunch Roman Catholic, and his wife was expecting a fourth child when the civil war broke out, two factors which together made up his mind not to enlist in the Basque nationalist cause as a defender of the Second Spanish Republic. In fact, he chose to fight on the nationalist side in a Tercio unit. Becoming a corporal, he transferred to the Army as a sergeant of Engineers.

At the end of the war, Arteche settled in Zarautz, and then in 1949 he moved to San Sebastián to take up an appointment as an archivist.

Arteche was much troubled by official censorship. In Spain after the civil war both books and articles needed the permission of the censor to be published at all, and the work of Arteche was often denied this permission, so he had to learn the art of writing between the lines. In 1958, a censor objected to the term “Guerra Civil” (civil war) being used in Arteche's Portar bien! and wanted it changed to “War of Liberation” or “Liberating Crusade.”

Arteche died at San Sebastián (called in Basque Donostia) in 1971.

== Selected works ==
- Una inquietud y cuatro preguntas (1934)
- San Ignacio de Loyola (Barcelona: 1941)
- Elcano (1942; Madrid: Espasa-Calpe, 1972)
- Urdaneta: el Dominador de Los Espacios Del Oceano Pacifico (1943)
- Mi Guipúzcoa (1946)
- Caminando (1947)
- Mi viaje diario (1950)
- S. Francisco Javier (Saragossa: Hechos y Dichos, 1951)
- Lope de Aguirre, Traidor: la tragedia del Fuerte Caudillo de los Invencibles Marañones (1951; San Sebastián: Caja de Ahorros de Guipúzcoa, 1974)
- Vida de Jesús (1955)
- ¡Portar bien! 1957)
- Saint-Cyran (de caracterología vasca) (Auñamendi, 1958)
- Camino y Horizonte (Pamplona: Gomez, 1960)
- Siluetas y recuerdos (Gómez, 1964)
- Lavigerie, el cardenal de Africa (1963)
- Rectificaciones y añadidos (1965)
- Discusión en Bidartea (1967)
- De Berceo a Carlos Santamaría (1968)
- El abrazo de los muertos: Diario de la Guerra Civil 1936–1939 (Icharopena, 1970)
- Canto a Marichu: Autobiografía (Sociedad Guipuzcoana de Ediciones y Publicaciones, 1970)
- El Gran Asombro (San Sebastián: Sociedad Guipuzcoana de Ediciones y Publicaciones, 1971)
- Canto a Joxe (1972)
- Un vasco en la postguerra: diario 1939-1971 (1977)

=== In English ===
- The Cardinal of Africa, Charles Lavigerie, Founder of the White Fathers translated by Mairin Mitchell (London, Catholic Book Club, 1964)
