= P. S. O'Hegarty =

Irish writer, historian and activist

Patrick Sarsfield O'Hegarty (Irish: Pádraig Sáirséal Ó hÉigeartaigh, 29 December 1879 – 17 December 1955) was an Irish writer, editor and historian and a member of the Supreme Council of the Irish Republican Brotherhood.

== Life ==
He was born at Carrignavar, County Cork, to John and Katherine (née Hallahan) Hegarty. His parents' families had emigrated to the United States after the Great Famine, and his parents married in Boston. His father was a member of the IRB.

He was educated at North Monastery CBS, where he formed an enduring friendship with Terence MacSwiney. In 1888 his father died of tuberculosis, aged 42. Left destitute, his mother pawned her wedding ring to pay for an advertisement looking for work, and eventually became a cook.

He joined the postal service in Cork in 1897. Along with J. J. Walsh he played in the Head Post Office hurling team. He joined the IRB and represented Munster on the IRB Supreme Council. He started writing for Arthur Griffith's United Irishman and the Shan van Vocht, a periodical established by Alice Milligan and Ethna Carbery.

He served at the main Postal Sorting Office in Mount Pleasant, London, from 1902 to 1913. Along with J. J. Walsh he spent three years at King's College, studying for the Secretary's Office. While O'Hegarty succeeded in his studies, Walsh did not, and returned to Ireland. O'Hegarty became the IRB representative for Southeast England and joined the Gaelic League and Sinn Féin, and became a strong advocate of the Irish language. In 1905, he was elected secretary of the local Dungannon Club, which drew in as members Robert Lynd, Herbert Hughes and George Cavan. In 1907, as Sinn Féin's London Secretary, he approved and signed the membership card of Michael Collins; he later became friend and mentor to Collins. He had to return to Ireland for a break due to overwork in 1909 and give up some of his work for the Gaelic League. However, he took over as editor of the IRB publication, Irish Freedom. It was in this publication that he famously wrote, concerning the visit of King George V to Ireland in 1911: "Damn your concessions, England: we want our country!" In 1912, at the height of the Playboy riots, he wrote four articles entitled "Art and the Nation" in Irish Freedom, which took a very liberal and inclusionist approach to Anglo-Irish literature and art in general, but invoked the wrath of many of the paper's readers.

In 1913 he was re-posted to Queenstown (present-day Cobh) as postmaster. He continued editing nationalist newspapers such as Irish Freedom (founded in 1910, it was suppressed in December 1914 on account of its seditious content) and An tÉireannach (1913) and joined the Irish Volunteers. At the outbreak of war he was moved to Shrewsbury, probably on account of his political activities. In 1915 he married Wilhelmina "Mina" Smyth, a schoolteacher and suffragist, and was then moved to Welshpool, Montgomeryshire. In the aftermath of the 1916 Rising, he was opposed to physical force. In 1918 he refused to take the British Oath of Allegiance and resigned his position in the Post Office.

O'Hegarty felt that the Abbey Theatre was "doing good for Ireland" and supported W. B. Yeats against attacks from Arthur Griffith and like-minded Nationalists. He opposed the extremist views of D. P. Moran, who sought a Roman Catholic Irish-speaking Ireland.

He was Secretary of the Irish Department of Post and Telegraphs from 1922 to 1945. He was elected a member of the Irish Academy of Letters in 1954.

His son, Seán Ó hÉigeartaigh, was a founder of the Irish-language publishing house Sáirséal agus Dill. His daughter Gráinne, a harpist, married Senator Michael Yeats, son of W. B. Yeats.

== Works ==
- A history of Ireland under the Union 1801–1922, 1952
- John Mitchel, an appreciation, 1917
- The indestructible nation, 1918
- Sinn Féin, an illumination, 1919
- Ulster, a brief statement of fact, 1919
- A short memoir of Terence McSwiney, 1922
- The victory of Sinn Féin, 1924
- The Victory of Sinn Féin: How it Won it and How it Used it, 1998 (Classics of Irish History, UCD Press) 2nd edition, Tom Garvin (Introduction).

== Legacy ==
O’Hegarty’s papers were acquired by the Kenneth Spencer Research Library of Kansas University. This includes a collection of books, pamphlets and periodicals of W. B. Yeats.
