= 2027 in the Marshall Islands =

- Decades: 2000s; 2010s; 2020s
- See also: Other events of 2027; Timeline of Marshallese history

Events in the year 2027 in the Marshall Islands.

== Events ==
- By November – 2027 Marshallese general election

== Holidays ==
- 1 January - New Year's Day
- 1 March - Remembrance Day
- 26 March – Good Friday
- 1 May – Constitution Day
- 2 July – Fishermen's Day
- 3 September – Labor Day
- 24 September – Manit Day
- 17 November – Presidents' Day
- 3 December – Gospel Day
- 25 December – Christmas Day
- 31 December – New Year's Eve
