= Public holidays in the Marshall Islands =

This is a list of public holidays in the Marshall Islands.

Date	English name
January 1	New Year's Day
March 1	Remembrance Day
March–April	Good Friday
May 1	Constitution Day
First Friday in July	Fishermen's Day
First Friday in September	Labor Day
Last Friday in September	Manit Day
November 17	Presidents' Day
First Friday in December	Gospel Day
December 25	Christmas Day
December 31	New Year's Eve
