= 2025 in the Marshall Islands =

- Decades: 2000s; 2010s; 2020s
- See also: Other events of 2025; Timeline of Marshallese history

Events in the year 2025 in the Marshall Islands.

== Incumbents ==
- President: Hilda Heine
- Speaker of the house: Brenson Wase

== Events ==
- 28 January: The government designates Bikar Atoll, Bokak Atoll and surrounding areas measuring 48,000 square kilometres as the country's first marine sanctuary.
- 14 August: The Marshall Islands national soccer team plays its first-ever international match, facing the US Virgin Islands in Springdale, Arkansas, losing 4–0.
- 26 August: The Nitijela building in Majuro burns down in a fire.

== Holidays ==
- 1 January - New Year's Day
- 1 March - Remembrance Day
- 18 April – Good Friday
- 1 May – Constitution Day
- 5 July – Fishermen's Day
- 2 September – Labor Day
- 27 September – Manit Day
- 17 November – Presidents' Day
- 10 December – Gospel Day
- 25 December – Christmas Day
- 31 December – New Year's Eve

== See also ==
- 2024–25 South Pacific cyclone season
