= 2024 in the Marshall Islands =

- Decades: 2000s; 2010s; 2020s
- See also: Other events of 2024; Timeline of Marshallese history

Events in the year 2024 in the Marshall Islands.

== Incumbents ==
- President: David Kabua (until January 3); Hilda Heine onwards
- Speaker of the house: Kenneth Kedi

== Events ==
- 3 January: Hilda Heine is sworn-in as President of the Marshall Islands after the finalization of election count results on December 27.
- 20 January: A winter storm causes severe flooding across Kwajalein, Arno, and several other atolls, with major damage to infrastructure, livelihoods, and agriculture.
- 28 February: The Marshallese Educational Initiative, a Springdale nonprofit, hosts a conference on the effects of U.S. nuclear testing in the Marshall Islands.
- 3 December: Taiwanese President Lai Ching-te visits Majuro.

=== Undated ===
- March: The United States completes legal enactment of an updated Compact of Free Association with the Marshall Islands, providing $2.3 billion in aid over 20 years.

== Holidays ==
- 1 January - New Year's Day
- 1 March - Remembrance Day
- 29 March – Good Friday
- 1 May – Constitution Day
- 5 July – Fishermen's Day
- 2 September – Labor Day
- 27 September – Manit Day
- 17 November – Presidents' Day
- 10 December – Gospel Day
- 25 December – Christmas Day
- 31 December – New Year's Eve

== See also ==
- 2023–24 South Pacific cyclone season
- 2023–24 South Pacific cyclone season
