= 2020 in the Marshall Islands =

- Decades: 2000s; 2010s; 2020s
- See also: Other events of 2020; Timeline of Marshallese history

Events in the year 2020 in the Marshall Islands.

== Incumbents ==
- President: Hilda Heine (until January 13) David Kabua (from January 13)
- Speaker of the house: Kenneth Kedi

== Events ==
Ongoing – COVID-19 pandemic in Oceania

- 24 January – The country issued a travel advisory that required any visitors to the country to have spent at least 14 days in a country free of COVID-19.
- 1 March – A previous travel ban was extended to China, Macau, Hong Kong, Japan, South Korea, Italy, and Iran.
- 18 March – All incoming international travel was indefinitely suspended, as well as some intra-island flight services, as a result of the pandemic.
- 14 September – It was announced that President David Kabua and the leaders of Palau, Kiribati, Nauru, and the Federated States of Micronesia will be hosting an in-person meeting. President of Nauru Lionel Aingimea said the leaders agreed to attend Palau's Independence Day on October 1 as the five Pacific countries remain free of COVID-19.
- 17 December – Marshall Islands police find a 5.5-meter (18-foot) fibreglass boat at Ailuk Atoll with 649 kilograms (1,430 pounds) of cocaine worth an estimated US$80 million. This is the largest drug bust in Marshall Islands history.

== See also ==
- COVID-19 pandemic in the Marshall Islands
- 2020 in Oceania
- 2019–20 South Pacific cyclone season
- 2020–21 South Pacific cyclone season
