= 2021 in the Marshall Islands =

- Decades: 2000s; 2010s; 2020s
- See also: Other events of 2021; Timeline of Marshallese history

Events in the year 2021 in the Marshall Islands.

== Incumbents ==
- President: David Kabua
- Speaker of the house: Kenneth Kedi

== Events ==
Ongoing – COVID-19 pandemic in Oceania

- 28 May – The Marshall Islands recognizes Fiamē Naomi Mataʻafa and the FAST party following the 2021 Samoan constitutional crisis.

== See also ==
- COVID-19 pandemic in the Marshall Islands
- 2020 in Oceania
- 2019–20 South Pacific cyclone season
- 2020–21 South Pacific cyclone season
