= 2022 in the Marshall Islands =

- Decades: 2000s; 2010s; 2020s
- See also: Other events of 2022; Timeline of Marshallese history

Events in the year 2022 in the Marshall Islands.

== Incumbents ==
- President: David Kabua
- Speaker of the house: Kenneth Kedi

== Events ==
Ongoing – COVID-19 pandemic in the Marshall Islands

- 9 August - The first community transmission cases of COVID-19 is reported in the capital Majuro. The government subsequently announces that the start of the school year will be delayed, and also suspends flights and boat travel to the country's outer islands.
- 11 August - The first COVID-19 related death is reported in a patient in Majuro.

== See also ==
- COVID-19 pandemic in the Marshall Islands
- 2021–22 South Pacific cyclone season
- 2021–22 South Pacific cyclone season
