= 2023 in the Marshall Islands =

- Decades: 2000s; 2010s; 2020s
- See also: Other events of 2023; Timeline of Marshallese history

Events in the year 2023 in the Marshall Islands.

== Incumbents ==
- President: David Kabua
- Speaker of the house: Kenneth Kedi

== Events ==
Ongoing – COVID-19 pandemic in the Marshall Islands

- November – 2023 Marshallese general election

== See also ==
- COVID-19 pandemic in the Marshall Islands
- 2022–23 South Pacific cyclone season
- 2022–23 South Pacific cyclone season
