= Baet-Ul-Ahad Mosque =

Mosque in Delap-Uliga-Djarrit, Majuro, Marshall Islands

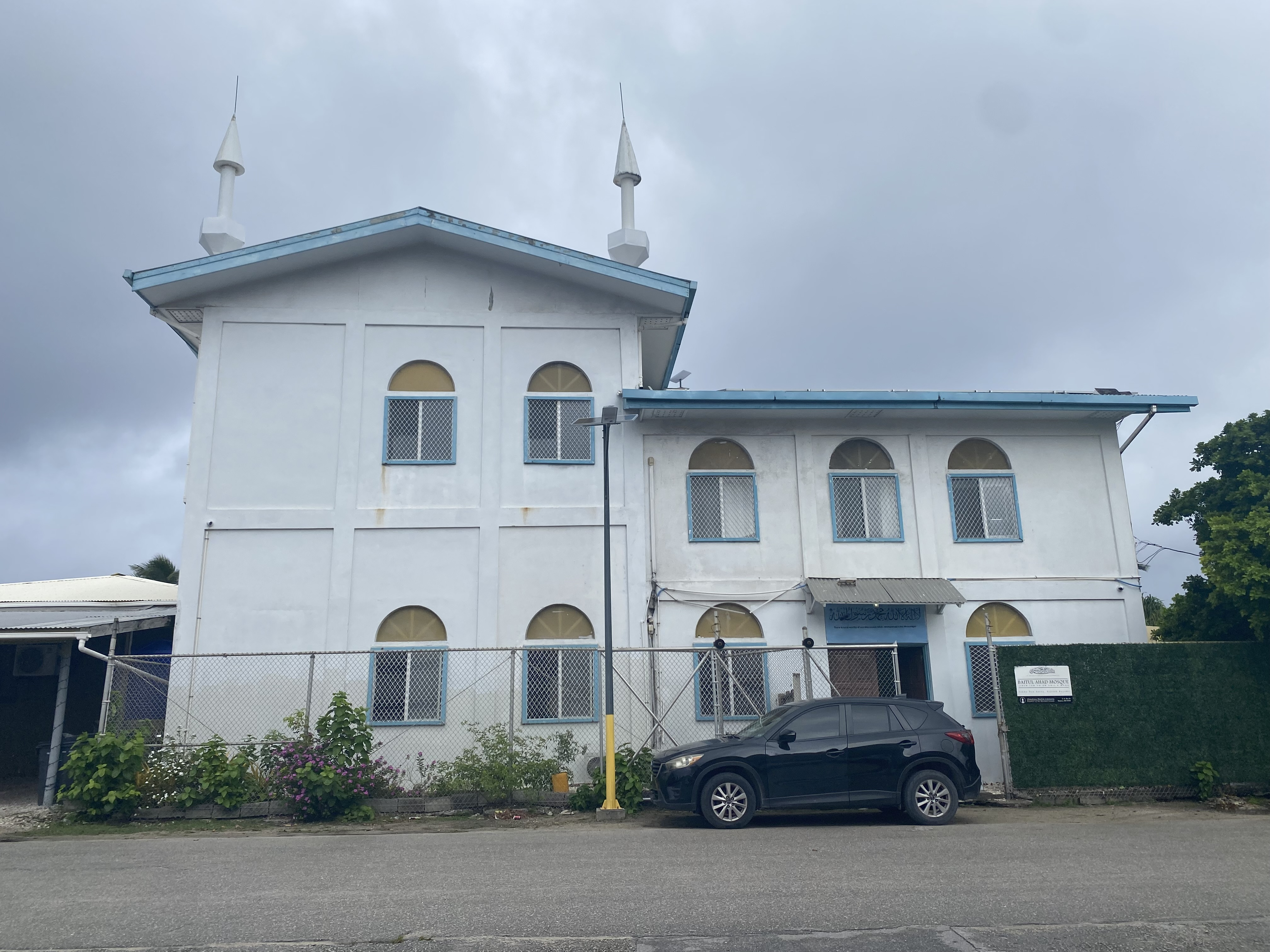
- The mosque exterior in 2023

- Location of the mosque in the Marshall Islands

Religion
- Affiliation: Ahmadiyya Islam
- Ecclesiastical or organisational status: Mosque
- Leadership: Imam Qasim Choudhary
- Status: Active

Location
- Location: Delap-Uliga-Djarrit, Majuro
- Country: Marshall Islands
- Coordinates: 7°06′28.2″N 171°22′27.0″E

Architecture
- Type: Mosque architecture
- Established: 2012 (as a community)
- Completed: 2012
- Minaret: 2

The Bait-Ul-Ahad Mosque is a mosque in Delap-Uliga-Djarrit, Majuro, Marshall Islands. Opened in September 2012, it was the first mosque established in the country and serves the local Ahmadiyya Muslim community. The mosque is a two-storey white building featuring a blue roof and two minarets. Its opening ceremony was attended by members of the country's Ahmadiyya community.

== Overview ==
The mosque was opened in 2012 as the only mosque in the country. The opening ceremony was attended by the members of Ahmadiyya Muslim community of the country. The mosque is a two-story white building with blue roof and two minarets.

== History ==
The land for the mosque was donated by the wife of Sam Ali Nena, a Tuvalu-born convert who first learned about Islam from Ahmadi missionaries visiting from Fiji in 1980 and was the first to encourage building a mosque. The opening was marked with a blessing, food, prayer and Quran readings translated into Marshallese.

Imam Matiullah Joyia, who arrived from Canada in 2012, recalled that on his first day a sign outside was pelted with eggs and the gate defiled with beer cans, at a time when there were scarcely a dozen Muslims in the country. By 2017 the mosque served about 120 Marshallese Muslims along with visiting Muslims.

Men pray in an upstairs hall overlooking the ocean and women downstairs, with sermons translated into Marshallese. The community runs computer training workshops, blood drives, agricultural projects and visiting medical missions, and in 2016 it hosted a World Religions Conference on Majuro attended by more than 250 people.

== See also ==
- Islam in the Marshall Islands
- List of mosques in Oceania
