= Islam in the Marshall Islands =

Islam is a minority religion in the Marshall Islands. All Muslims in the country belong to the minority Ahmadiyya sect. The Ahmadiyya mosque in Uliga, first constructed in 2012 in the Marshall Islands is the only mosque in Oceania's subregion of Micronesia. According to a 2009 report there were about 10 Muslims in the Marshall Islands, although more recent reports indicate about 150 believers in the country.

== History ==
Islam entered the country in the 1990s when Fijian missionaries were sent to the country by the Ahmadiyya movement. In 2001, the religion was officially recognized by the country and in 2012, the community built Marshall Islands first mosque, named Baet-Ul-Ahad Mosque, in the town of Uliga, in the east coast of the Majuro atoll. While Majuro has the only mosque in the Marshall Islands, Ahmadi Muslim communities exist in atolls around the country.

== Modern community ==
Ahmadi Muslims have had a growing presence in the Marshall Islands for a number of years. However, it was not until 2012, when the Muslim community decided to construct Marshall Islands' only mosque, that it began to draw attention from religious and political figures. In light of unfavourable public opinion about Islam in general, the Muslim community's right to exist in an overwhelmingly Christian Marshall Islands, was questioned in a number of live broadcast sessions in the Marshallese parliament. This was despite Marshall Islands' constitution that guarantees religious freedom.

The Ahmadi Muslims play an active role in the life of local Marshallese, by working with local youth groups, the Ministry of Health and through the international charitable trust, Humanity First.

== Mosques ==
- Baet-Ul-Ahad Mosque

== See also ==
- Islam in Oceania
- Religion in the Marshall Islands
