= 2017 in the Marshall Islands =

- Decades
- See also: Other events of 2017; Timeline of Marshallese history

Events in the year 2017 in the Marshall Islands.

== Incumbents ==
- President: Hilda Heine
- Speaker of the house: Kenneth Kedi

== Events ==
- 21 February – 2017 Marshallese Constitutional Convention election

== Deaths ==
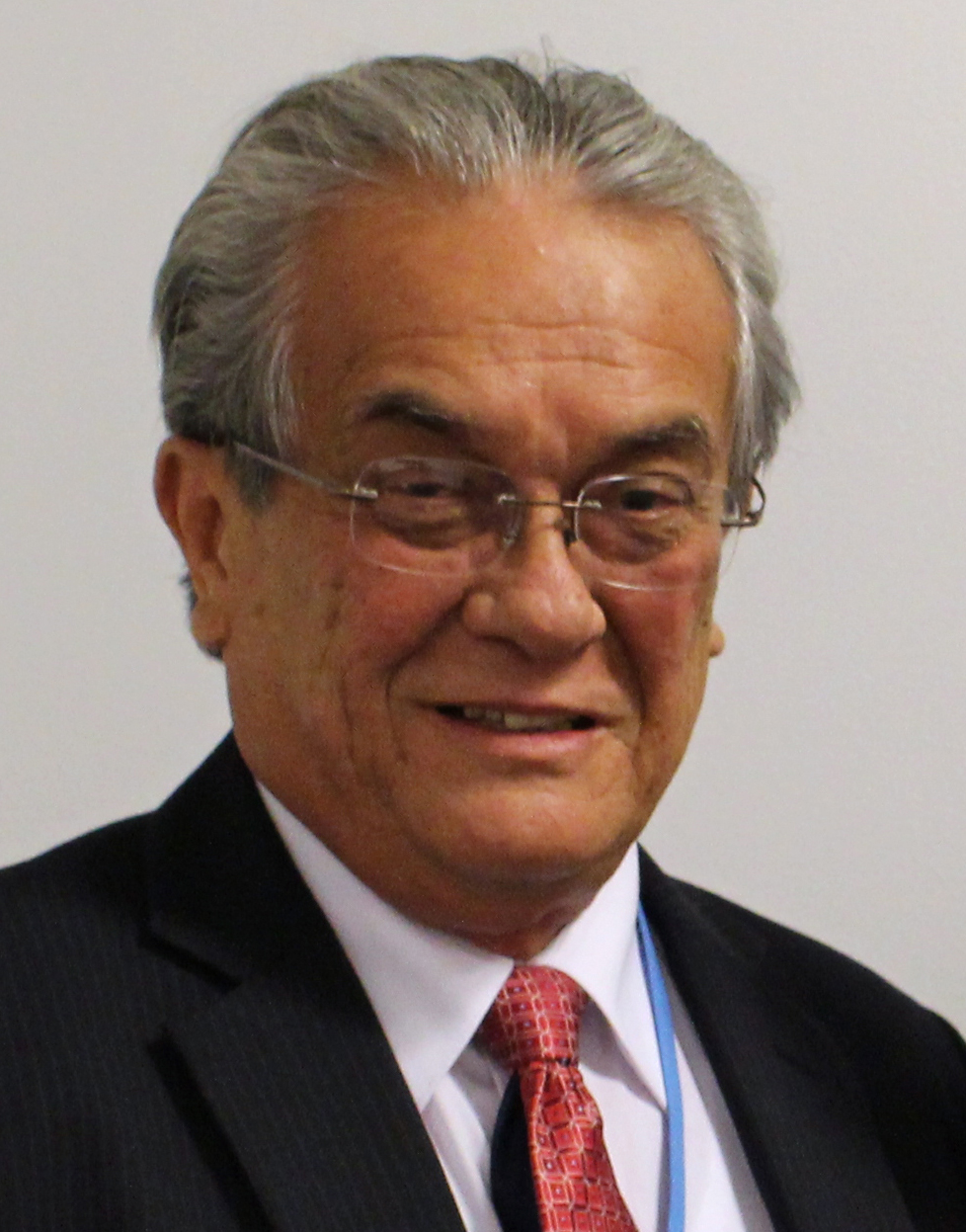
Tony deBrum

- 7 August – Mattlan Zackhras, politician and diplomat (b. 1970).
- 22 August – Tony deBrum, politician and government minister (b 1945)
