= Culture of the Marshall Islands =

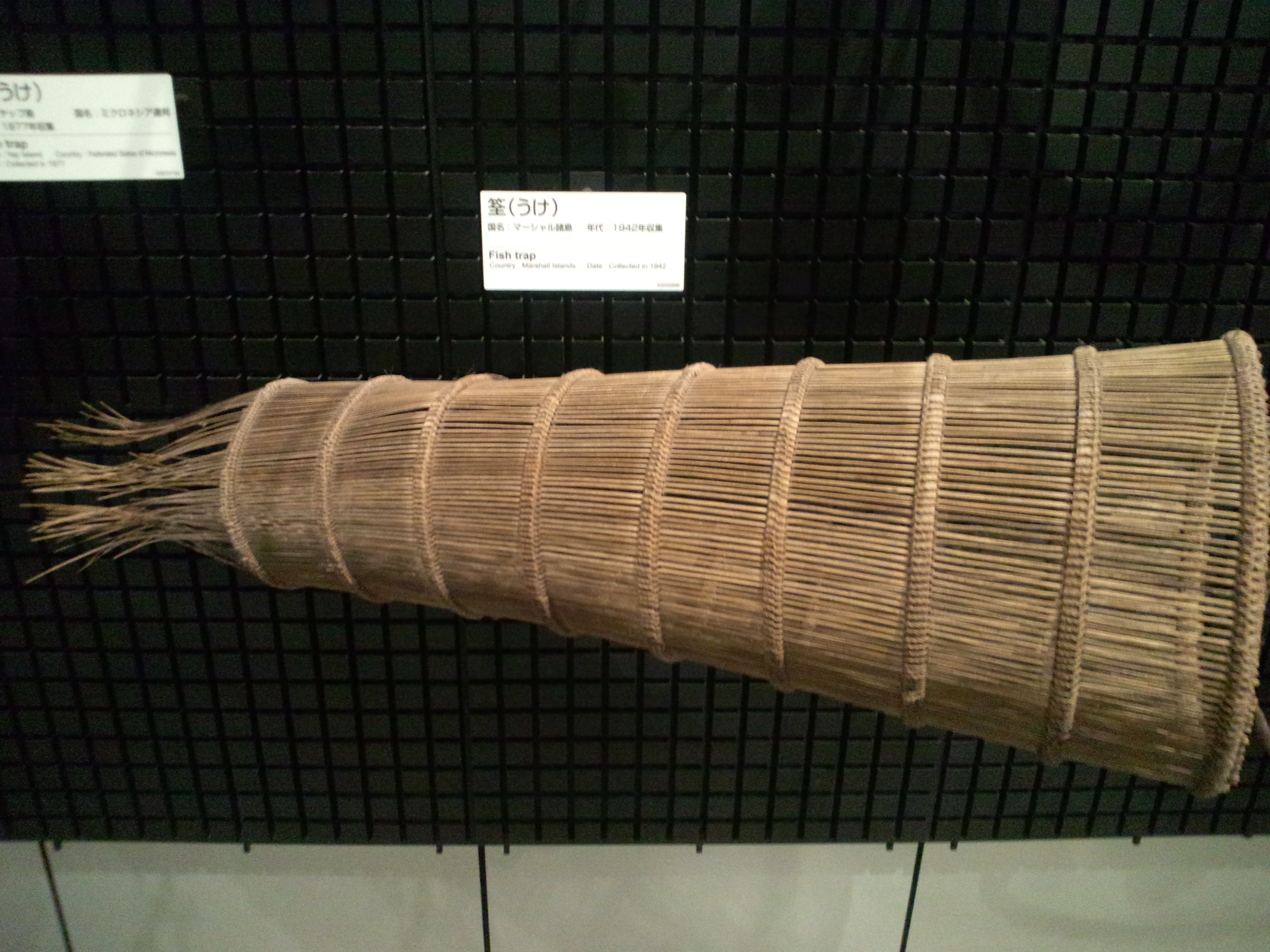
Marshall Islander fish trap, c. 1940s

The culture of the Marshall Islands forms part of the wider culture of Micronesia. It is marked by pre-Western contact and the impact of that contact on its people afterward. The Marshall Islands were relatively isolated. Inhabitants developed skilled navigators, able to navigate by the currents to other atolls. Prior to close contact with Westerners, children went naked and men and women were topless, wearing only skirts made of mats of native materials.

The land was and still remains the most important measure of a family's wealth. Land is inherited through the maternal line.

Since the arrival of Christian missionaries, the culture has shifted from a subsistence-based economy towards a more westernized economy and standard.

The people can be described as friendly and peaceful. Strangers are relatively received warmly. Consideration for others is important to the Marshallese people. Family and community are important. Concern for others is an outgrowth of their dependence on one another. They have lived for centuries on isolated coral atolls and islands. Relatives including grandparents, aunts, uncles, cousins and far-flung relatives are all considered close family. The strong family ties contribute to close-knit communities rooted in the values of caring, kindness and respect. One of the most significant family events is a child's first birthday.

The island culture was heavily impacted by the fight for Kwajalein Atoll during World War II and the United States nuclear testing program on Bikini Atoll from 1946 and 1958. Former residents and their descendants who were ousted after World War II receive compensation from the U.S. government. This dependence on aid has shifted residents' loyalty away from traditional chiefs. The island culture is heavily influenced today by the presence of about 2000 foreign personnel on the Ronald Reagan Ballistic Missile Defense Test Site, which includes rocket launch, test, and support facilities on eleven islands of the Kwajalein Atoll, along with Wake Island and Aur Atoll.

== Pre-western culture ==
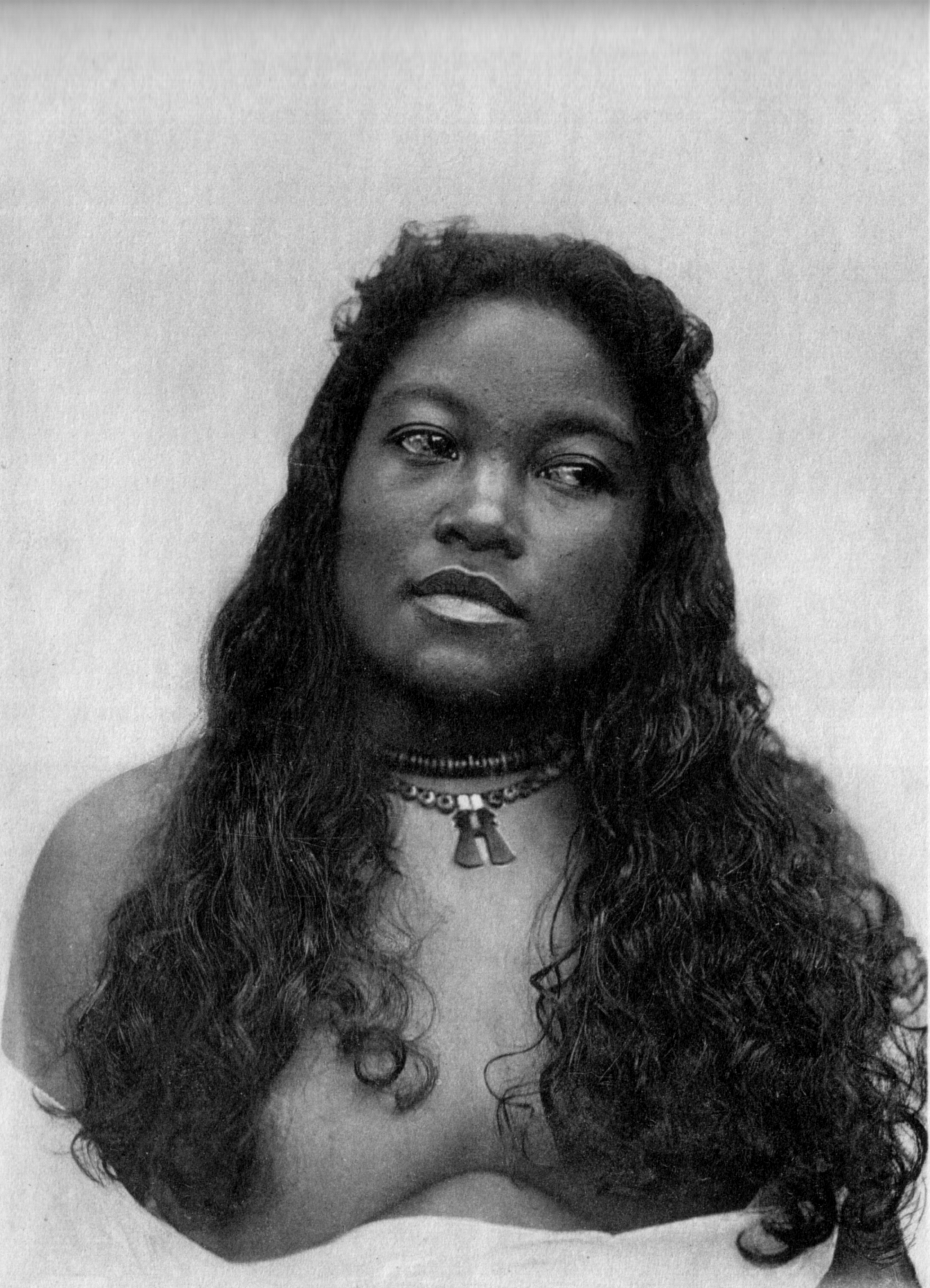
Marshallese woman from Jaluit in the Ralik Chain with a traditional necklace in about 1908

The Marshallese were once skilled navigators, able to sail long distances aboard the two-hulled proa between the atolls using the stars and stick and shell charts. They hold annual competitions sailing their proa, a ship made of teak panels tied together with rope made of palm and sealed with palm rope. The sail was anciently woven from palm fronds. The islanders were relatively isolated and had developed a well-integrated society bound by close extended family association and tradition. Men and women wore only skirts made of native materials woven into mats. Children were generally naked.

== Modern culture ==
The modern culture of the islanders is heavily influenced by Western Christian missionaries who began arriving in the late 19th century. The economic activity of some Marshallese from the Bikini Islanders has been changed by their growing dependence on payments made by the U.S. government.

=== Clothing and dress ===
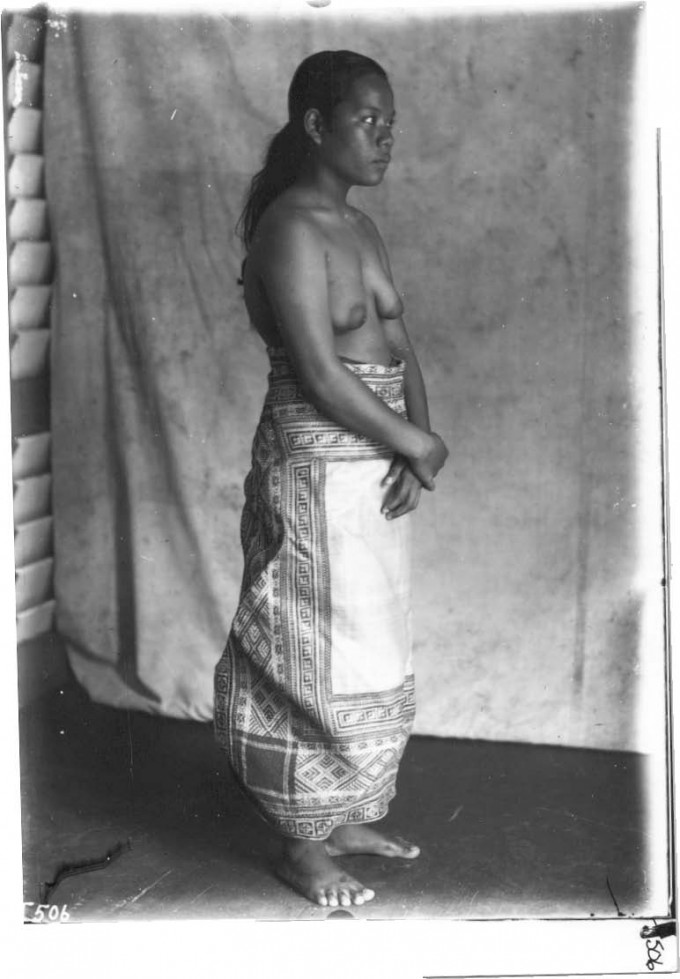
A woman named Liijabor from Likiep Atoll in the Marshall Islands wearing a traditional nieded or clothing mat, c. 1918

The men wore a fringe skirt of native materials about 25 to 30 inches (60 to 80 cm) long. Women traditionally wore two mats about a yard (metre) square each, made by weaving pandanus and hibiscus leaves together, and belted around the waist. Children were usually naked.

The missionaries influenced the islanders' notions of modesty. In 1919, a visitor reported that Marshall Islands women "are perfect models of prudery. Not one would think of exposing her ankles..." Every lagoon was led by a king and queen and a following of chieftains and chief women who comprised a ruling caste. Some of the leaders maintained Western-style bungalows and maintained servants, including secretaries, maids, and valets.

Poverty was non-existent. The islanders worked the copra plantations under the watchful eye of the Japanese, who took a portion of the sales. Chiefs could retain as much as US$20,000 per year. The remainder was distributed to the workers. They took pride in extending hospitality to one another, even distant relatives.

Women in the Marshall Islands today are still very modest. They believe a woman's thighs should be covered. Women generally wear cotton muʻumuʻus or similar clothing that covers most of the body. While personal health is never discussed except within the family, and although women are especially private about female-related health issues, they are willing to talk about their breasts.

Marshall island women swim in muʻumuʻus which are made of a fine polyester that quickly dries. In the capital of Majuro, revealing cocktail dresses are inappropriate for both islanders and guests. With the increasing influence of Western media, the younger generation may wear shorts, though the older generation equates shorts with loose morals. T-shirts, jeans, skirts, and makeup are making their way via the media to the islands.

=== Income ===
Before the advent of Western influence, the islanders' sustenance-based lifestyle was based on cultivating native plants and eating shellfish and fish. Payments made in the 20th century to descendants of Bikini Island residents as reparations for damage to the Bikini Atoll and the islanders' way of life have elevated their income relative to other Marshall Island residents. It has caused some Bikini islanders to become economically dependent on the payments from the trust fund. This dependency has eroded individual's interest in traditional economic pursuits like taro and copra production. The move also altered traditional patterns of social alliance and political organization. On Bikini, rights to land and land ownership were the major factor in social and political organization and leadership. After relocation and settlement on Kili, a dual system of land tenure evolved. Disbursements from the trust fund was based in part to land ownership on Bikini and based on current land tenure on Kili.

=== Land-based wealth ===
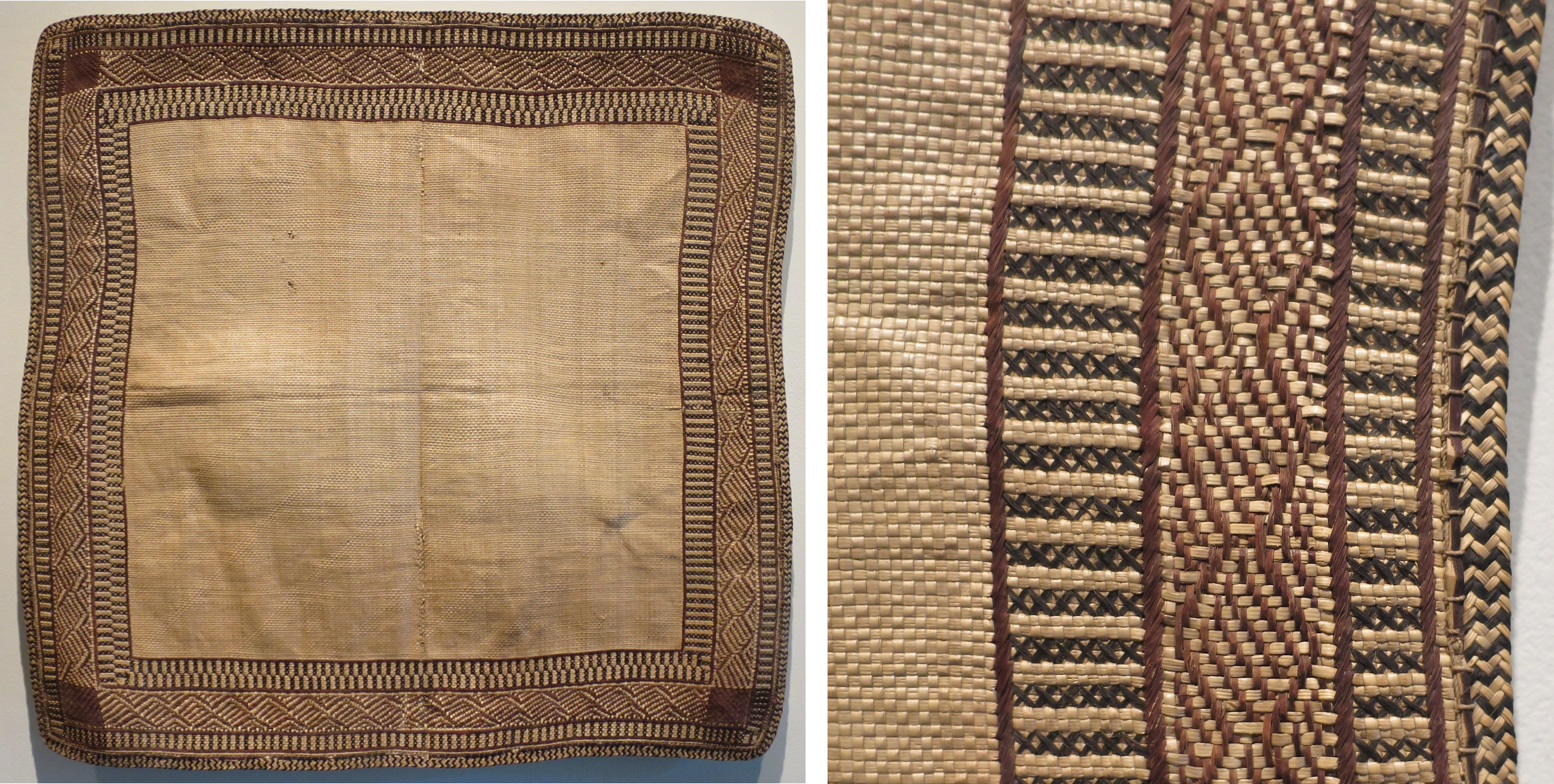
A dress mat from the Marshall Islands

The Marshallese society is matrilineal and land is passed down from generation to generation through the mother. Land ownership ties families together into clans. Grandparents, parents, grandchildren, aunts, uncles, and cousins form extended, close-knit family groups. The islanders continue to maintain land rights as the primary measure of wealth.

To all Marshallese, land is gold. If you were an owner of land, you would be held up as a very important figure in our society. Without land you would be viewed as a person of no consequence... But land here on Bikini is now poison land.

=== Clan-based society ===
Marshallese social classes included distinct chiefs and commoners. The irooj laplap held the most power and were considered almost sacred or godly. To show respect, others stooped and approached on their knees. They always obeyed the orders of their high chief. The irooj laplap received the best food, could choose the best land, and had as many wives as they wanted. In return, they were responsible for leading the people in community work, on sailing expeditions, and in war. Their power was normally limited to one part or the whole of one atoll. A high chief who waged war successfully could conquer and control several atolls. The irooj laplap were followed by the irooj rik, the lesser chiefs, and finally the kajur, or commoner.

Each family is part of a clan (Bwij), which owns all land. The clan owes allegiance to a chief (Iroij). The chiefs oversee the clan heads (Alap), who are supported by laborers (Rijerbal). The Iroij control land tenure, resource use and distribution, and settle disputes. The Alap supervise land maintenance and daily activities. The Rijerbal work the land including farming, cleaning, and construction.

The Marshallese society is matrilineal and land is passed down from generation to generation through the mother. Land ownership ties families together into clans, and grandparents, parents, grandchildren, aunts, uncles, and cousins form extended, close-knit family groups, and gatherings tend to become big events. One of the most significant family events is the first birthday of a child {kemem}, where relatives and friends celebrate with feasts and song.

Before the residents were relocated, they were led by a local chief and under the nominal control of the Paramount Chief of the Marshall Islands. Afterward, they had greater interaction with representatives of the trust fund and the U.S. government and began to look to them for support.

=== Language ===
Both Marshallese and English are the official languages of the Marshall Islands. Some Marshallese speak both the Marshallese language and at least some English. There is a large portion of the Marshallese population, especially from outer islands, who do not speak English at all. Marshallese has multiple dialects and providing written information which can be understood by the majority is difficult. Government agencies use Marshallese. One important word in Marshallese is "yokwe" which is similar to the Hawaiian "aloha" and means "hello", "goodbye" and "love".

=== Food ===
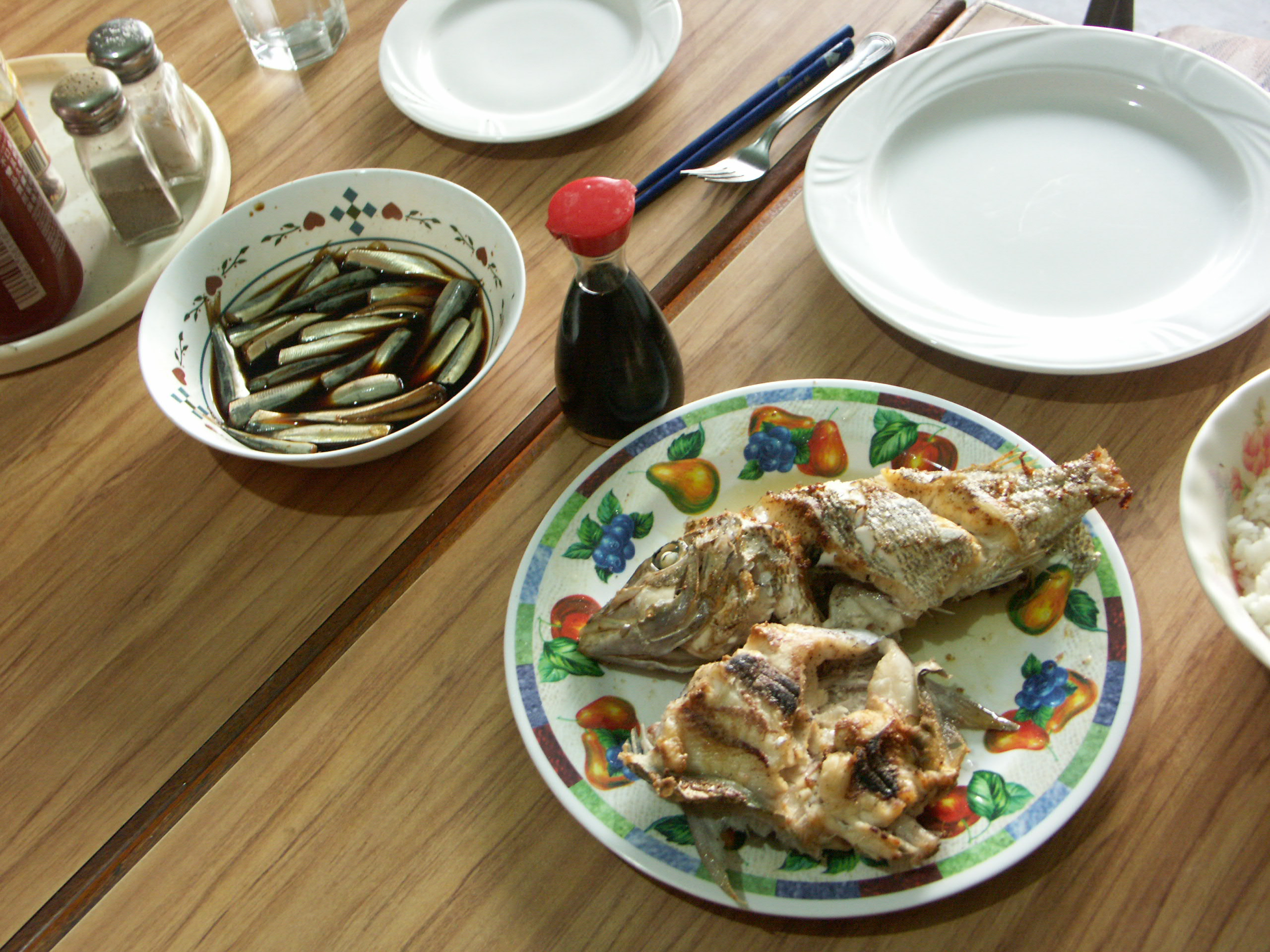
Meal of fish prepared in the Marshall Islands

Marshallese food that is eaten today can be dated back to the establishment of the actual culture. A staple food of the Marshallese culture is rice. The intake of rice was most likely influenced by the Korean. The Marshallese eat meats like pork, fish, shellfish, chicken. Considering that it is an island there is no beef unless shipped frozen. With the many coconut trees on the island, coconuts would be a staple food as well.

As far as preparing the food, usually the women prepare all the sides and men prepare the meat. When serving food at events it is important on how you serve it and who you serve in order. The first to receive food should be the Pastor in a respectful manner. After the Pastor is served, if it is a birthday, then the parents of the child and the child shall receive food next. Then the grandparents and so on and so forth.

== Legal ==
Unlike most other countries, the Marshall Islands have no copyright law.

== See also ==
- Religion in the Marshall Islands
- Music of the Marshall Islands
