= COVID-19 pandemic in the Marshall Islands =

- Disease: COVID-19
- Pathogen: SARS-CoV-2
- Location: Marshall Islands
- First outbreak: Wuhan, China
- Index case: Kwajalein
- Arrival date: 29 October 2020
- Confirmed cases: 16,297
- Deaths: 17
- Fatality rate: 0.1%
- Vaccinations: 39,268 (fully vaccinated)

The COVID-19 pandemic in the Marshall Islands was part of the worldwide pandemic of coronavirus disease 2019 (COVID-19) caused by severe acute respiratory syndrome coronavirus 2 (SARS-CoV-2). The virus was confirmed to have reached the Marshall Islands on 28 October 2020, but remained confined to quarantined arrivals (no domestic community spread) until August 2022. The first known community transmission cases of COVID-19 were confirmed in Majuro on August 8, 2022, ending the country's COVID-free status. The first confirmed death from COVID-19 in the Marshall Islands occurred on August 11, 2022.

The Marshall Islands were the first country in the Pacific Islands to start its COVID-19 vaccination program, which commenced in December 2020.

== Background ==
On 12 January 2020, the World Health Organization (WHO) confirmed that a novel coronavirus was the cause of a respiratory illness in a cluster of people in Wuhan City, Hubei Province, China, which was reported to the WHO on 31 December 2019.

The case fatality ratio for COVID-19 has been much lower than SARS of 2003, but the transmission has been significantly greater, with a significant total death toll.

== Timeline ==
Cases

Deaths

The first cases in the country were reported on 28 October 2020, among two members of the US Army Garrison, who were among a group of 300 Marshall Islanders abroad being repatriated.

The two cases, a man and woman who arrived at a US airfield in Kwajalein tested negative for the virus in Hawaii a week before their arrival. The disaster committee of the Marshall Islands has said "there was no threat of community transmission" and that no lockdown would be implemented until further notice.

On 29 December 2020, the Marshall Islands became the first country in the Pacific to start its COVID-19 vaccinations. A group of high ranking leaders joined with Ministry of Health's doctors and nurses were the first to receive the United States government provided vaccines.

By 13 April 2021, the Marshall Islands reached an adult population vaccination rate of nearly 75% in the "main towns" with their first dose. After completing the urban areas, the Ministry of Health and Human Services planned to distribute Moderna and Johnson & Johnson vaccines to the most remote islands of the country to vaccinate the rest of the population. The 20,000 vaccine doses were provided as a donation by the United States and were deemed sufficient to cover every island's populations.

August 2022 saw the first outbreak of the virus in the Marshall Islands.

== Statistics ==
=== New cases per day ===
View source data.

=== Cases by islands ===
Cases by islands as of 25 November 2022
Island	Cases	Recovered	Deaths	References
Ailinglaplap	163	163	0	
Ailuk	198	198	0	
Arno	363	363	0	
Aur	150	150	0	
Ebon	13	13	0	
Jaluit	783	783	0	
Kwajalein (Note: 340 cases at the U.S. Army Garrison - Kwajalein Atoll)	3,154	3,143	4	
Majuro	9,883	9,869	12	
Maloelap	200	200	0	
Mejit	115	115	0	
Mili	72	49	0	
Utrik	102	102	0	
Wotje	345	344	1	
	15,541	15,524	17	

== Vaccination ==
By the end of 2022, 80% the population had been fully vaccinated, and a significant population had also received a booster dose.
