= Remembrance Day (Marshall Islands) =

Remembrance Day, formally known as Nuclear Victims' Day and Nuclear Survivors' Day, occurs on March 1 and is a national holiday in the Marshall Islands. The day honors the victims and survivors of nuclear testing done in the area in the 1950s.

Castle Bravo was the code name given to the first U.S. test of a dry fuel thermonuclear hydrogen bomb device, detonated on March 1, 1954 at Bikini Atoll, Marshall Islands, as the first test of Operation Castle. Fallout from the detonation poisoned the islanders who had previously inhabited the atoll.

== See also ==
- Operation Crossroads
- Bikini Atoll
