= Religion in the Marshall Islands =

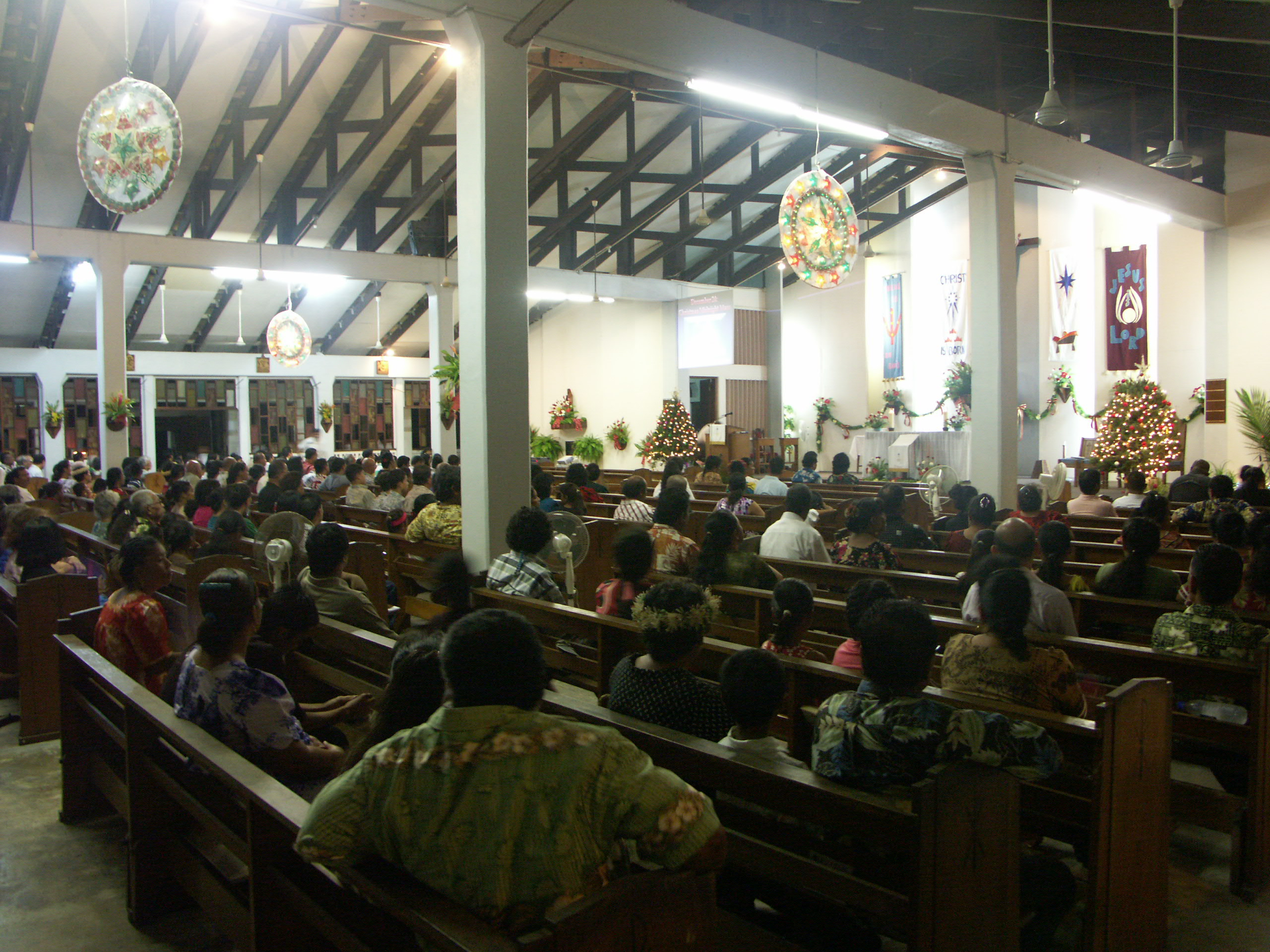
Christian worship service inside a church in Delap-Uliga-Djarrit

Christianity has been the main religion in the Marshall Islands ever since it was introduced by European missionaries in the 19th century.

The government generally supports the free practice of religion, although the minority Ahmadiyya Muslim community has reported some harassment and discrimination.

== Demographics ==
At the September 2021 census about 96.2% of the population identified with one of fourteen established Christian denominations in the Marshall Islands. The denominations with more than 1,000 adherents included the United Church of Christ – Congregational in the Marshall Islands (47.9%), the Assemblies of God (14.1%), the Catholic Church (9.3%), the Church of Jesus Christ of Latter-day Saints (5.7%), the Full Gospel Churches of the Marshall Islands, Mission & Evangelism Inc. (5%) and Bukot nan Jesus (3%). The remainder of denominations primarily included protestant churches as well as Jehovah's Witnesses. 1,128 people, or 2.7% of respondents identified as belonging to a religion other than one of the fourteen denominations listed on the census form. 444 people, or 1.1% of respondents claimed to be irreligious. In 2014 there were 150 members of the Ahmadiyya Muslim Community.

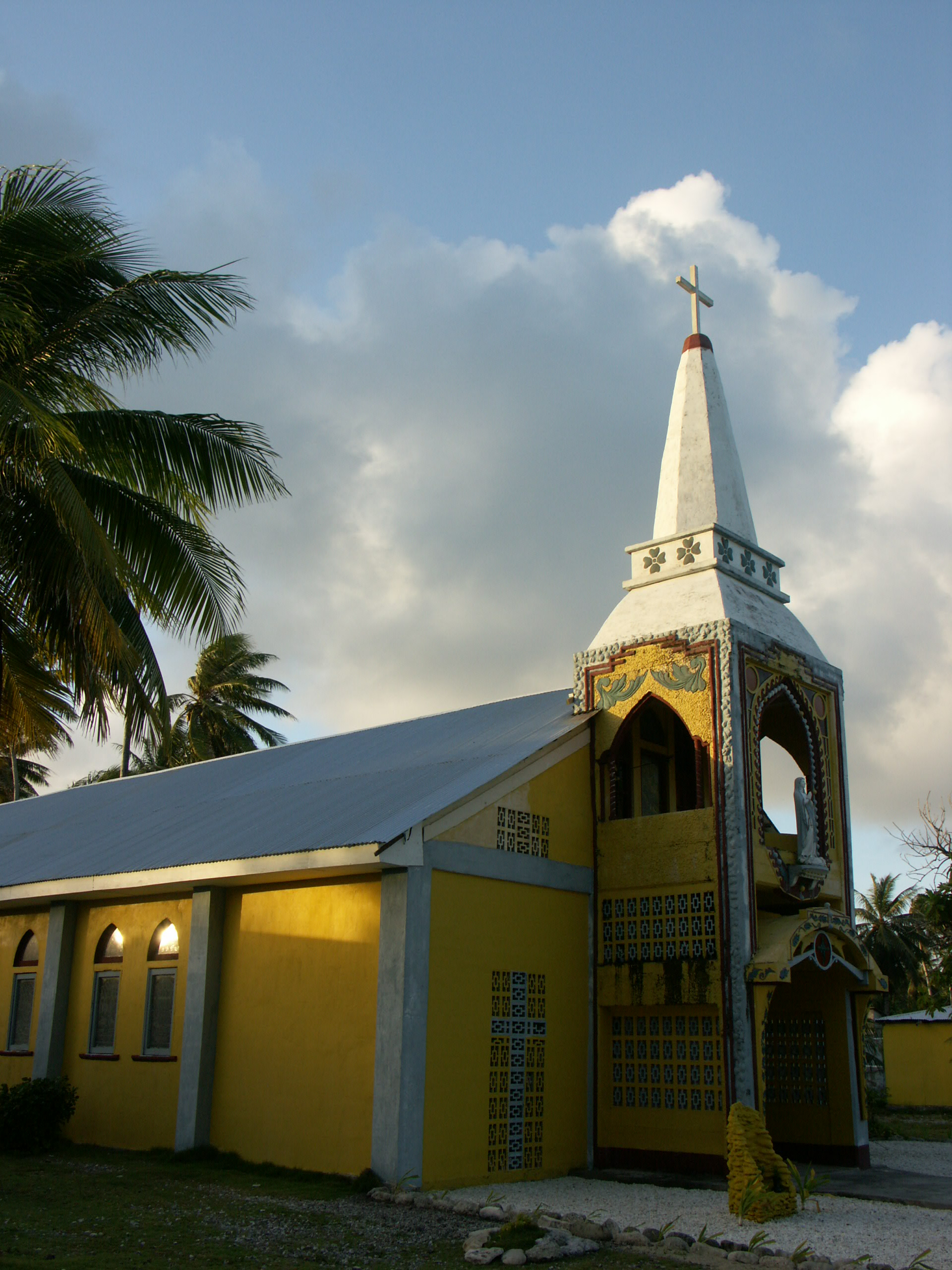
Catholic church in Likiep Atoll

== Religious freedom ==
The constitution of the Marshall Islands establishes the freedom of religion, although it provides that this freedom may be limited by "reasonable restrictions". The constitution further states that no law may discriminate against any person on the basis of religion.

The Roman Catholic church, United Church of Christ, Assemblies of God, Seventh-day Adventist Church, Bukot Non Jesus, and the Baptist Church operate religious schools. Religious groups are not required to register with the government, but they may receive tax benefits if they register as non-profits.

Public schools do not provide religious education but school events and government functions typically begin and end with a Christian prayer. The government provides some funding to private religious schools.

The Ahmadiyya Muslim community in the Marshall Islands has reported that it faces difficulties interacting with the government, as well as harassment in general society. Representatives attributed these attitudes to perceptions that Islam is linked to terrorism.

In 2023, the country was scored 4 out of 4 for religious freedom.

== History of religious beliefs ==
Prior to the arrival of Europeans to the islands, and with them the introduction of Christianity, the Marshallese practiced their own native polytheistic religions. However, after 1857, which marked the arrival of the Europeans, conversions to Christianity became common in the late 19th century when a large number of Christian missionaries were sent to the islands. Local shrines and places of worship were destroyed and replaced with churches. Despite the influence of Christianity, many of the islanders did not completely discard their indigenous rituals and customs. They practiced a syncretic form of religion that infused the beliefs of both Christianity and their indigenous religions. One example of this is the continued use of divination. "Some Marshallese still practice divination as their ancestors did, but instead of tying knots in leaf strands, they may open the bible and let their finger fall upon a verse at random in the hope that the words will shed light on what they are expected to do". The belief in magic continues to play a (at least) residual role in the daily life of the people of the Marshall Islands.

== Indigenous religious beliefs and mythology ==
Although polytheistic, the Marshallese indigenous beliefs prior to the introduction of Christianity had one higher god, one higher above the rest. According to James George Frazer, the Marshallese people respected this certain God, and offered him tributes like breadfruit, coconut, fish, etc. In their language, they referred to this deity as Iageach which signifies, "god". Prior to a serious undertaking they would solemnly bring offerings to their gods. If a man would go out in search of food or fishing, he would have to offer something in his family's name to the gods.

Indigenous Marshallese also worshiped spirits. They believed some types of spirits would appear in dreams or sometimes possess the body of a human to be seen in the flesh. "They included the spirits of dead relatives who might return at times to possess someone in the family so as to provide valuable information or other assistance." Some spirits were considered good and some were considered evil. The evil spirits were called Anjilik. These evil spirits were thought to cause disease. Indigenous Marshallese believed sickness and disease was caused by spirits, and "so the most effective remedies for sickness also had to be sought from the spirits".

Indigenous Marshallese also worshiped nature spirits. Usually these spirits were associated with certain plants or places. To the Marshallese people, like other Micronesians, the world was filled with dangers caused by superhuman forces. Some of these spirits were "fixed" to particular locations while others could roam widely. One example might have been a particular spot or reef that could have been considered dangerous because of the harmful spirits lurking there. To determine who had caused some sickness and how it could be treated, the "Marshallese turned to the spirits for the knowledge that they were unable to attain on their own". They used different methods of divinations in attempts to find solutions to diseases that afflicted them. One such divination involved throwing a handful of pebbles on the ground and discerning some meaning from the observed pattern. Another type of divination required tying knots randomly in strands of coconut or pandanus leaves and deriving divine knowledge from the number of resulting knots.

== See also ==
- Roman Catholic Apostolic Prefecture of the Marshall Islands
- The Church of Jesus Christ of Latter-day Saints in the Marshall Islands
- Baháʼí Faith in the Marshall Islands
- Islam in the Marshall Islands
