= History of the Marshall Islands =

Austronesian settlers arrived in the Marshall Islands in the 2nd millennium BC, but there are no historical or oral records of that period. Over time, the Marshallese people learned to navigate over long ocean distances by walap canoe using traditional stick charts.

== Prehistory ==
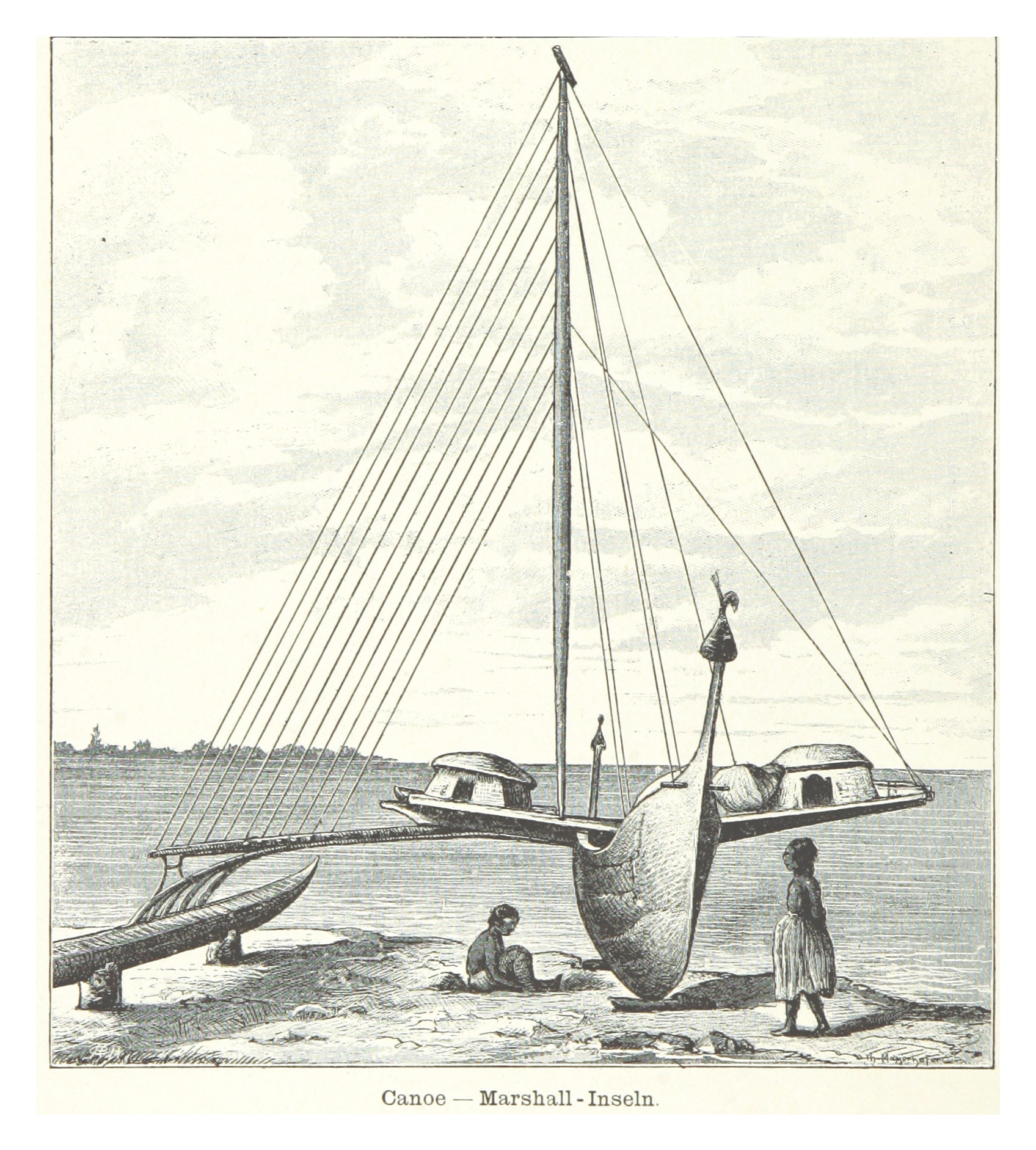
German illustration of a Marshallese oceangoing walap, c. 1883

Linguistic and anthropological studies have suggested that the first Austronesian settlers of the Marshall Islands arrived from the Solomon Islands. Radiocarbon dating of um earth ovens, post holes, and trash pits at Bikini Atoll suggests that the atoll may have been continuously inhabited from 1200 BCE to at least 1300 CE, though samples may not have been collected from secure stratigraphic contexts and older driftwood samples may have affected results.The archaeological community broadly rejects the earliest radiocarbon dates (circa 1200 BCE) reported by Charles Streck for Bikini Atoll due to significant methodological flaws. The primary criticism is the "old wood effect," where samples were potentially derived from ancient driftwood logs that floated across the Pacific for centuries, skewing the dates older than the actual human activity. Furthermore, Streck failed to provide secure stratigraphic contexts or detailed records, leaving the scientific community unable to verify that the charcoal originated from undisturbed human cultural layers rather than natural deposits or erosion. Archaeological digs on other atolls have found evidence of human habitation dating around the 1st century CE, including earth ovens at the Laura village, Majuro, with a date range of 93 BCE to 127 CE and Kwajalein with a range of 140 BCE to 255 CE.

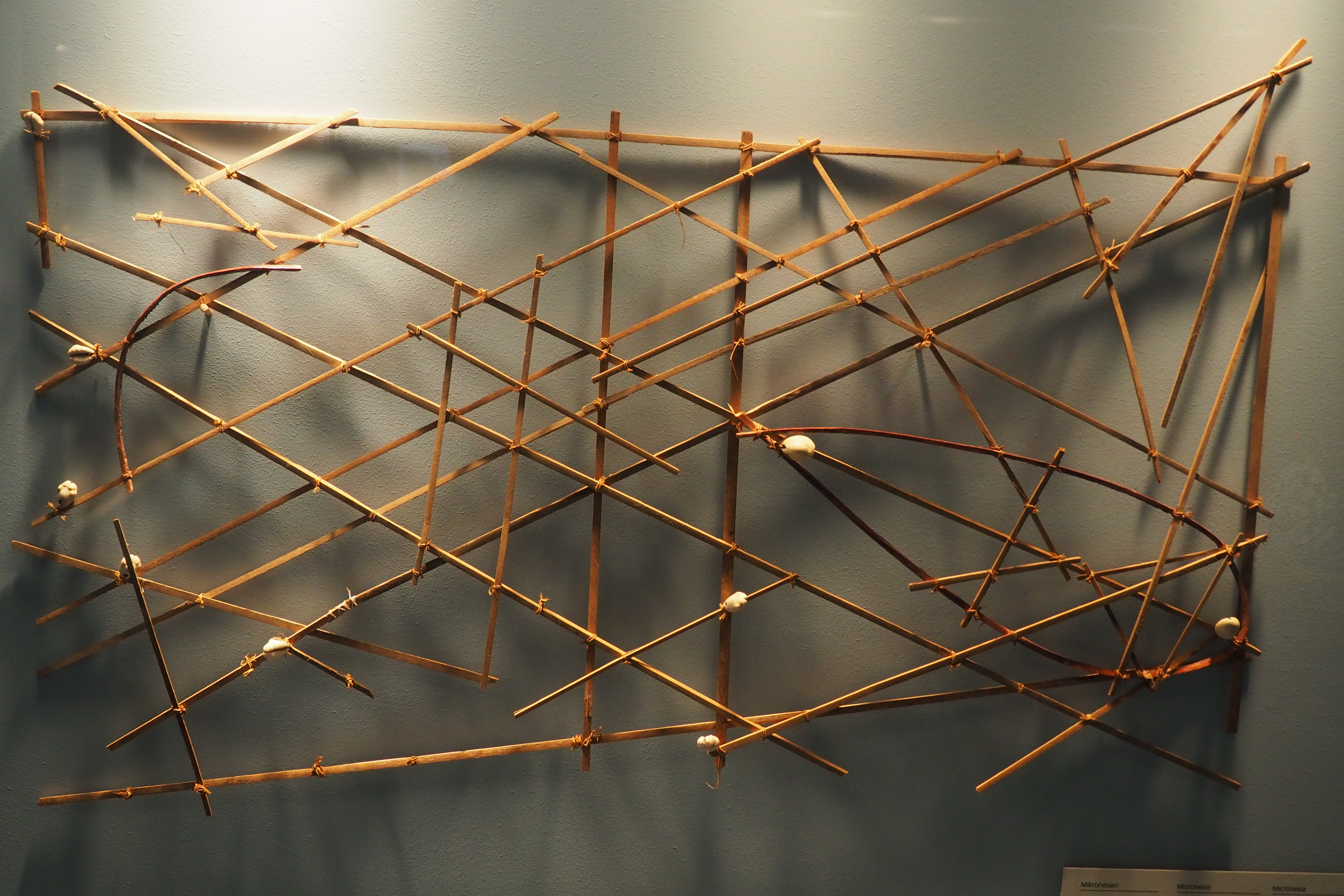
A Marshallese stick chart. Most were made from a grid of coconut frond midribs with small shells representing the relative location of islands.

The Marshallese sailed between islands on proas made from breadfruit-tree wood and coconut-fiber rope. They navigated by using the stars for orientation and initial course setting, but also developed a unique piloting technique of reading disruptions in ocean swells to determine the location of low coral atolls below the horizon. The Marshallese recognized four different types of swells coming from the cardinal directions, and noticed that swells refracted around the undersea slope of atolls. When refracted swells from different directions met, they created noticeable disruption patterns, which Marshallese pilots could read to determine the direction of an island. When interviewed by anthropologists, some Marshallese sailors noted that they piloted their canoes by both sight and feeling changes in the motion of the boat. The Marshallese preferred to sail between July and October, because Pacific trade winds made the swells harder to read during the rest of the year. Sailors also invented stick charts to map the swell patterns, but unlike western navigational charts, the Marshallese stick charts were tools for teaching students and for consultation before embarking on a voyage; navigators did not take charts with them when they set sail. The Marshallese made three types of charts: mattang charts, which were instructional tools for teaching the principles of piloting, and meddo and rebbelib charts, which represented the relative positions of actual swells and islands.

The Austronesian settlers introduced Southeast Asian crops, including coconuts, giant swamp taro, and breadfruit, as well as domesticated chickens throughout the Marshall Islands. They possibly seeded the islands by leaving coconuts at seasonal fishing camps before permanently settling years later. The southern islands receive heavier rainfall than the north, so communities in the wet south subsisted on prevalent taro and breadfruit, while northerners were more likely to subsist on pandanus and coconuts. Southern atolls probably supported larger, more dense populations. Archaeological digs have found adzes and chisels made from tridacna and cassis shells as well as ornaments, jewelry, beads, fishhooks, and fishing lures made from shell and coral.

When Russian explorer Otto von Kotzebue visited the Marshalls in 1817, the islanders still showed few signs of western influence, aside from a few scraps of metal and stories of passing ships. He observed that the Marshallese lived in thatched-roof huts, but their villages did not include the large-ornate meetinghouses found in other parts of Micronesia. They did not have furniture, except for woven mats, which they used for both floor coverings and clothing. The Marshallese had pierced ears and tattoos. Kotzebue noted that the Marshallese tried to keep women away from foreigners, similar to other Micronesians and unlike Polynesians. On the islands he visited, Kotzebue learned that Marshallese families practiced infanticide after the birth of a third child as a form of population planning due to frequent famines. He also noted that Marshallese iroij (chieftains) held considerable authority and rights to all property, though he had a more favorable view of the condition of Marshallese commoners than of Polynesian commoners. The Marshalls' two island groups, the Ratak and Ralik chains were each ruled by a paramount chief, or iroijlaplap, who held authority over the individual island iroij.

== European exploration ==
=== Spanish exploration ===
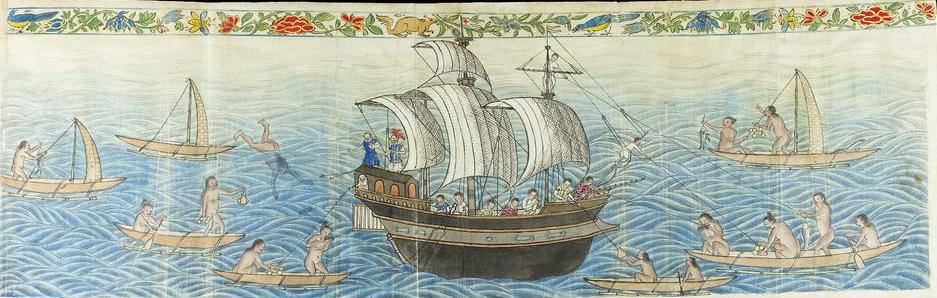
Manila Galleon in the Marianas and Carolinas, c. 1590 Boxer Codex

Spanish explorer Alonso de Salazar led the first European expedition to see the Marshall Islands on August 21, 1526. While commanding the Santa Maria de la Victoria, the only surviving vessel of the Loaísa Expedition, his crew sighted an atoll with a green lagoon, which may have been Taongi. The crew could not land on the island, because of strong currents and water too deep for the ship's anchor. Salazar named the island "San Bartolomé," and the ship sailed for Guam on August 23.

In late December 1527, the Spanish ship Florida arrived in Marshall Islands as the expedition of Álvaro de Saavedra Cerón crossed the Pacific from Mexico to the Maluku Islands. The expedition probably saw the Utirik, Toke, Rongelap, and Ailinginae atolls, though Francis Hezel suggests the islands could have also been Fais and Yap in the Caroline Islands. Saavedra named the island grouping "Islas de los Reyes" (English: Islands of the Kings) due to the proximity of the Christian feast of the Epiphany. Canoes from the islands approached the ship but did not make contact with the Europeans. On January 2, 1528, the expedition landed on an uninhabited island in Ailinginae Atoll, where they resupplied and stayed for six days. Natives from a neighboring island briefly met the Spanish before fleeing. Saavedra's expedition sailed toward the Philippines on January 8. Saavedra made two unsuccessful attempts to recross the Pacific and return to Mexico. On September 21, 1529, on the second recrossing attempt, the expedition may have passed Ujelang Atoll, and on October 1, the ship anchored at Enewetak Atoll where the crew went ashore for eight days, exchanged gifts with the indigenous inhabitants and resupplied. Saavedra named the atoll "Los Jardines" (English: The Gardens).

On December 26, 1542, a fleet of six Spanish ships commanded by Ruy López de Villalobos sighted an island in the Marshalls while sailing from Mexico to the Philippines. They landed and named the island "Santisteban" in honor of Saint Stephen's Day. The island was inhabited, though many of the people fled the Spanish landing. The Spaniards found some women and children hiding in the island's vegetation and gave them gifts. Before leaving the islands on January 6, 1543, Villalobos sighted islands that may have included Wotje, Erikub, Maloelap, Likiep, Kwajalein, Lae, Ujae, Wotho or Ujelang.

Miguel López de Legazpi commanded a fleet of four Spanish ships that sailed from Mexico in November 1564 en route to the Philippines. The San Lucas under the command of Alonso de Arellano broke away from the others, possibly because pilot Lope Martín and other crew members intended to engage in piracy in the East Indies, and sailed into the Marshall Islands in their attempt to avoid the fleet's other ships. The ship passed Likiep on January 5, 1565; Kwajalein on January 7, where they met two Native families; and Lib Island on January 8. Lib was heavily inhabited, and Arellano described the Natives as warlike and expert at throwing stones with slings, so the ship sailed on without landing. Meanwhile, Legazpi's other three ships arrived at Mejit on January 9, 1565. On the island, they found a settlement of one-hundred people who subsisted by fishing, farming root vegetables and millet-like grains, and raising poultry. Most of the inhabitants had fled into the interior, but the Spaniards had peaceful relations with an elderly couple and a woman who stayed behind. Legazpi named the island "Los Barbudos" (English: The Bearded Ones), because of the inhabitants' facial hair. On January 10, the Spaniards sighted Ailuk Atoll and Jemo Island, which they named "Los Placeres" (English: The Banks) and "Los Pajaros" (English: The Birds). On January 12, they sighted Wotho Atoll, and on January 15, Ujelang, before sailing to the Philippines.

The San Lucas returned to Mexico on July 17, 1565, and one of Legazpi's other ships returned from the Philippines on September 18. On May 1, 1566, the San Jeronimo sailed from Acapulco to resupply Legazpi in the Philippines. Lope Martín, who had returned to Mexico on the San Lucas, served as pilot of the San Jeronimo and led a mutiny and executed the captain. While sailing through the Marshalls, the San Jeronimo nearly wrecked at Ujelang before anchoring in the atoll's lagoon on July 6. The mutineers spent several days resupplying on an island, which was inhabited though the residents had fled in canoes. On July 16, four loyalist crew members snuck back to the ship and took control from the mutineers aboard. Lope Martín had taken the ships instruments and sails ashore. Unable to take back the ship, he negotiated to return of the ship's instruments in exchange for food and supplies. After regaining the sails, the loyalist crew members marooned Lope Martín and twenty-six other mutineers on the island before sailing for Guam on July 21.

By the late 16th century, Spanish galleons sailing between the Americas and the Philippines kept to a sea lane thirteen degrees north and provisioned at Guam, avoiding the Marshalls, which Spanish sailors saw as unprofitable islands amid hazardous waters. One of the last known Spanish expeditions occurred when Álvaro de Mendaña de Neira's ships Los Reyes and Todos los Santos arrived at Namu Atoll on September 18, 1568, while searching for Terra Australis. Mendaña named the atoll "San Mateo" shoals. They found many houses as well as a chisel made from a nail and pieces of rope, which may have been left behind by Villalobos or Lope Martín. On October 20, the ships arrived at Wake Island, which Mendaña named "San Francisco."

=== Later European exploration ===
The British ships Charlotte and Scarborough visited the islands in 1788 under the commands of captains Thomas Gilbert and John Marshall, respectively. The vessels had been part of the First Fleet taking convicts from England to Botany Bay in New South Wales, and were en route to Guangzhou when they passed through the Gilbert Islands and Marshall Islands. On June 25, 1788, the British ships traded with islanders at Mili Atoll; their meeting may have been the first contact between Europeans and Marshallese in over 200 years. Gilbert and Marshall also sighted Arno, Majuro, Aur, Maloelap, Wotje, and Ailuk atolls in late June, but made no further landings. Subsequent navigational charts and maps named the islands for John Marshall.

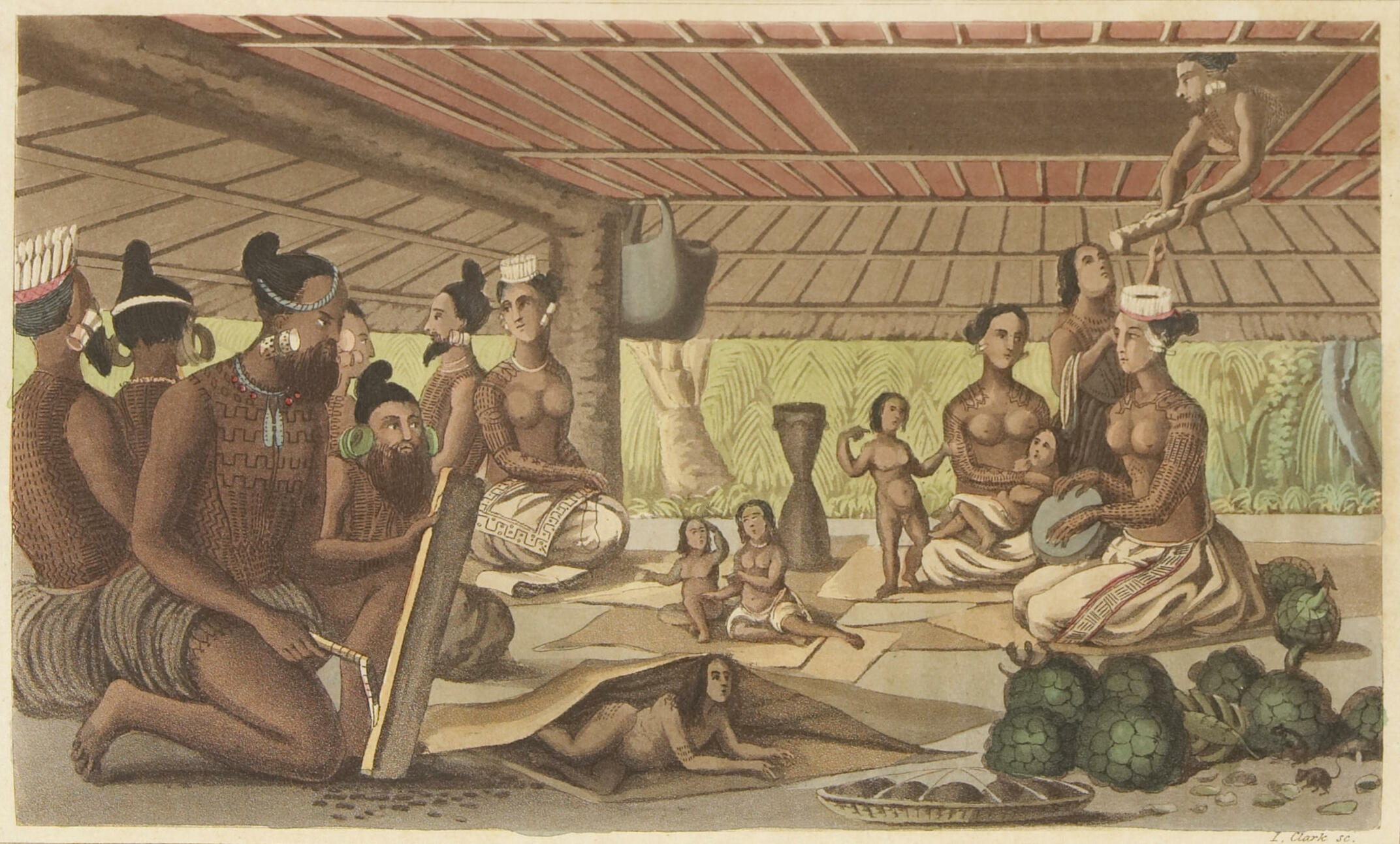
Interior of a house in the Ratak Chain, c. 1821, from the first English edition of Otto von Kotzebue's account of his 1815–1818 voyage

Beginning in the 1790s, British East Indiamen began passing through the Marshall Islands en route to China and charted the islands they encountered. Most of the islands and atolls had been sighted and plotted on navigation charts by 1815, with the exception of a few northern islands.

Russian explorer Otto von Kotzebue spent three months exploring the Ratak Chain in early 1817, and returned to explore the islands on two occasions in 1824 and 1825. According to Kotzebue's account, the Marshallese people showed few signs of western influence on his first visit in 1817. He gifted the islanders metal knives and hatchets and set up a temporary forge to craft fishhooks and harpoons. He also introduced new crops, including yams, as well as livestock, including pigs, goats, dogs, and cats. Kotzebue also noted that in 1817, Lamari, the iroij of Aur Atoll, had successfully conquered the other atolls of northern Ratak Chain and was preparing to go to war with Majuro Atoll. On his return trips in the 1820s, Kotzebue found that the Marshallese were still tending to crops that he had given them, but that the livestock and metal tools were concentrated among the island chieftains. He also found that the metal hatchets had played a decisive role in Lamari's victory over the people of Majuro; by the time of Kotzebue's second visit, Lamari was planning to further expand his power and begin making incursions into the Ralik Chain.

== Early colonialism ==
In February 1824, the American whaler Globe anchored at Mili Atoll after the crew mutinied and killed the ship's officers. While the mutineers were ashore, five dissenting crew members made off with the ship and marooned the mutineers. Two years later, the American navy schooner Dolphin arrived and found that mutineers had been massacred by the Marshallese due to their brutal treatment of the local women. The only survivors were two boys, who had been spared and adopted by the Marshallese.

From the 1830s through the 1850s, the Marshallese Islanders became increasingly hostile to western vessels, possibly because of violent punishments that sea captains exacted for theft as well as the abduction of Marshallese people for sale into slavery on Pacific plantations. In 1833, the inhabitants of Ebon Atoll seized a dozen crew members of the British whaler Elizabeth when they went ashore. The sailors were never seen again. In 1834, the captain of a trading schooner and two of his crew members were killed at Bikini Atoll. Three vessels were sent to search for the captain, and when the Hawaiian brig Waverly discovered evidence of his death, the crew killed 30 Marshallese hostages in retaliation. In 1835, the inhabitants of Namdrik Atoll boarded the Massachusetts whaler Awashonks, killing the captain and five crew members before their iroij was killed by a musket shot. The inhabitants of Mili Atoll attacked whalers in 1837 and 1844. In 1845, a fight broke out on the deck of the Naiad after the captain violently punished a native for stealing from the ship. Several Marshallese were killed and four crew members were seriously wounded. In 1850, two passengers of the William Melville were killed after going ashore at Kwajalein Atoll. In 1851 and 1852, the Marshallese attacked three ships and massacred their crews: the Glencoe at Ebon, the Sea Nymph at Jaluit Atoll, and an unnamed ship at Namdrik. There were no survivors from the Glencoe, and only one Sea Nymph crew member escaped. By some accounts, both ships were abducting Marshallese women to sell to plantation owners in other parts of the Pacific.

European and American missionaries and traders had peaceful contact with the Marshallese beginning at Ebon Atoll in the mid-1850s. The atoll saw increased ship traffic and exposure to foreigners beginning, which also led to outbreaks of western diseases. In February 1859, an influenza outbreak killed several commoners on Ebon. In 1861, measles and influenza outbreaks occurred on the island, and in 1863, a typhoid fever outbreak killed several islanders.

=== Missionary activity ===
In 1855, American Board of Commissioners for Foreign Missions assigned George Pierson to its mission in Micronesia. He stopped at Ailinglaplap Atoll and met iroijlaplap Kaibuke before making his way to Kosrae, where we worked with 50 Marshallese castaways and learned the Marshallese language. In November 1857, Pierson, Edward Doane and their families returned to Marshalls to establish a mission at Ebon. The atoll's population fluctuated as Kaibuke's fleet came and went to exact tribute from his vassals; the frequent comings and goings from the atoll have helped to spread the missionaries' sermons to other islands. Within the first few years of the mission, the missionaries noticed social changes taking place on Ebon. Women were permitted to attend certain religious feasts for the first time, and traditional burial rites fell out of practice. While the Marshallese continued to practice tattooing, some felt guilty about the practice and stopped carrying out the rites publicly. Islanders also began to observe the Christian injunction against work on the weekly sabbath. By 1876, a traveller noted that most Marshallese women on Ebon wore western dresses and jumpers, and many men wore trousers instead of traditional grass skirts.

Pierson and his wife left Ebon for their health in 1859, and Doane left in 1863, having sent his family to Hawaii two years earlier. Both were replaced by Native Hawaiian missionaries, who ran a mission school and printed Marshallese-language bibles. Ten Ebon islanders were baptized in 1863, and the number increased to over 100 by 1870. By 1865, mission churches and schools had opened on Jaluit and Namdrik. Missions spread to Mili and Majuro in 1869, and to Arno and Maloelap Atolls by 1875, at which point more than 200 Marshall Islanders had been baptized. By the mid-1870s, most island churches were staffed by Marshall Islanders who had been trained in the mission schools.

While the church was popular among commoners, the Marshallese nobles became increasingly hostile to Christianity after Kaibuke's death in the 1863 typhoid fever outbreak. Many of the chiefs stopped church services, and some retaliated against converts. One Marshallese noble woman burned the houses of converts. Francis Hezel speculates that the nobility may have seen increasing literacy and access to new information among the commoners as a threat to their authority, fueling increased hostility to Christianity, and notes an 1870 case in which a Christian commoner publicly chastised his island's chief for leading young girls astray and went unpunished.

=== Western commercial interests ===
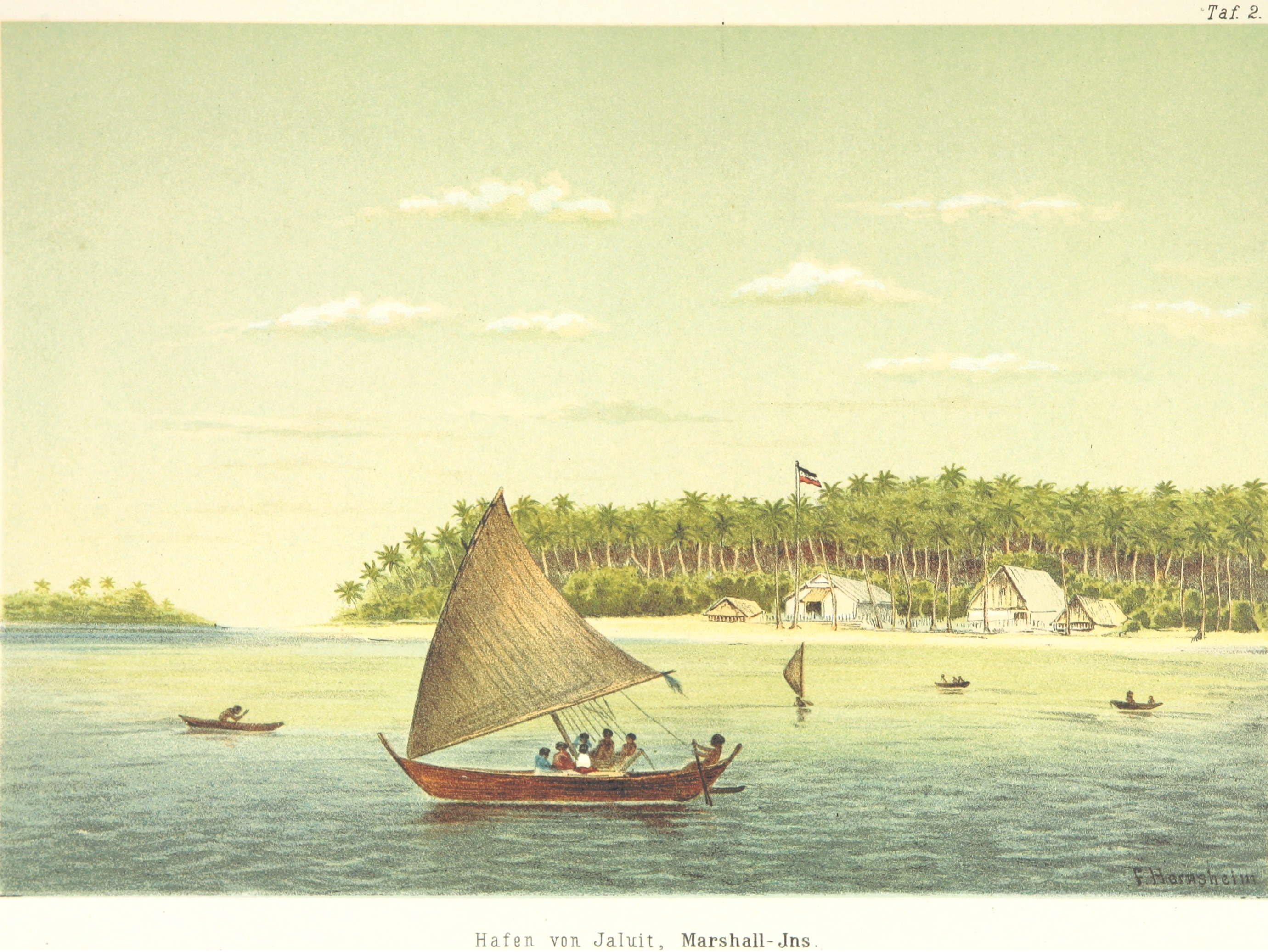
German trading station at Jaluit Atoll with a Marshallese korkor outrigger canoe in the foreground, c. 1880

In 1859, the German firm Hoffschlaeger & Stapenhorst sent two traders to establish a trading post at Ebon Atoll. In 1861, they built a coconut oil factory on the island. In 1863, the firm suffered serious financial setbacks and withdrew from the Marshall Islands, partially due to the sinking of one of its ships while leaving Ebon. One of the traders, Adolph Capelle, set up an independent trading firm on the island by partnering with Anton Jose DeBrum, a Portuguese whaler who arrived in 1864. Both men married local women and developed strong connections with both the Marshall Islanders and the missionaries. Their firm, Capelle & Co., entered into an agreement to sell coconut copra to Godeffroy & Son of Hamburg, a company which pioneered the production of copra in Samoa and Tonga and held a large share of Pacific copra trade. Godeffroy exported copra to Europe where it was processed into animal feed and coconut oil, which was used in soap and candle manufacturing. The German firms traded western goods to Marshallese chiefs in exchange for coconuts, which Marshallese commoners harvested as tribute for the chiefs.

In 1873, Capelle & Co. moved its headquarters to Jaluit, which was the home of Kabua, a powerful iroij and disputed successor of Kaibuke. Godeffroy & Son also established trading posts on five islands in 1873 with a main office on Jaluit, but the European stock market crash later that year caused the firm to cut back its operations. Capelle dominated the copra market in the early years, but in 1876, Hernsheim & Co. and New Zealand merchant Thomas Farrell both began copra trading in the Marshall Islands. The increased competition set off a price war that disrupted the industry and proved advantageous for Marshallese suppliers. The firms also began selling the Marshallese previously prohibited goods, including alcohol, firearms, and munitions, despite the missionaries' complaints.

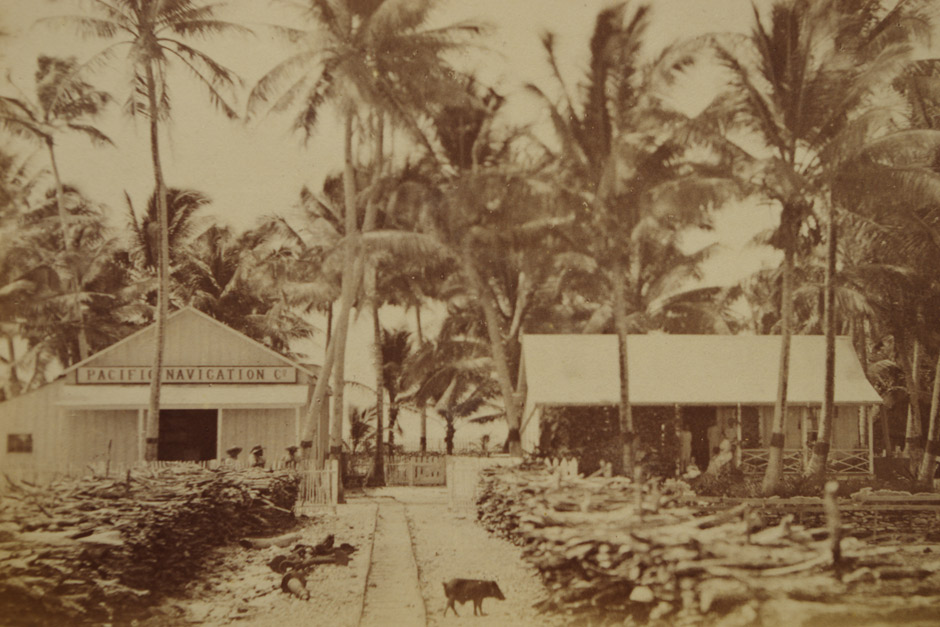
The offices of the Pacific Navigation Co. on Jaluit in the late 1880s

By 1878, Hernsheim & Co. had emerged as the dominant firm in the copra trade. While Capelle & Co. lost market share, Capelle and DeBrum purchased the entirety of Likiep Atoll as a copra plantation to control their buying price and supply of copra. Capelle & Co. also diversified its interests to include shipbuilding and importing. Farrell went bankrupt in 1877, and his assets were acquired by Auckland firm Henderson & Macfarlane. Godeffroy & Son went bankrupt in 1879, and in 1880, its Pacific interests were acquired by the German Trading and Plantation Company of the South Sea Islands in Hamburg (German: Deutsche Handels- und Plantagen-Gesellschaft Der Südee Inseln zu Hamburg), also known as DHPG. The world market price of copra dropped in 1882; Capelle & Co. sold seven of its stations in the Marshalls to DHPG and made an agreement to exclusively sell copra to Hernsheim & Co. By 1885, the German firms DHPG and Hernsheim & Co. controlled two-thirds of the copra trade in the Marshall Islands, with the rest split between Henderson & Macfarlane of Auckland, Crawford & Co. of San Francisco, and the Pacific Navigation Company of Honolulu.

==== Blackbirding ====
In the 1870s, Marshall Islanders were coerced into working on plantations in other parts of the Pacific, a practice was known as "blackbirding". In 1871, the ships Eugene and Carl kidnapped men at Ailinglaplap and Mili Atolls, respectively. In 1872, trader William Henry "Bully" Hayes kidnapped women on Mili while pirating the stations of business rivals. Several blackbirding ships cruised the northern Marshalls specifically to obtain women that they could sell into sexual slavery in Fiji. Mortality rates among Micronesian laborers in Fiji and Samoa were high, and few returned home. The labor trade in Marshall Islands declined somewhat after the British government passed the Pacific Islander Protection Act 1872, but Jaluit continued to serve as a depot for transporting Gilbertese laborers and some Marshallese were transported to Hawaiian plantations as late as 1882.

=== Marshallese politics ===
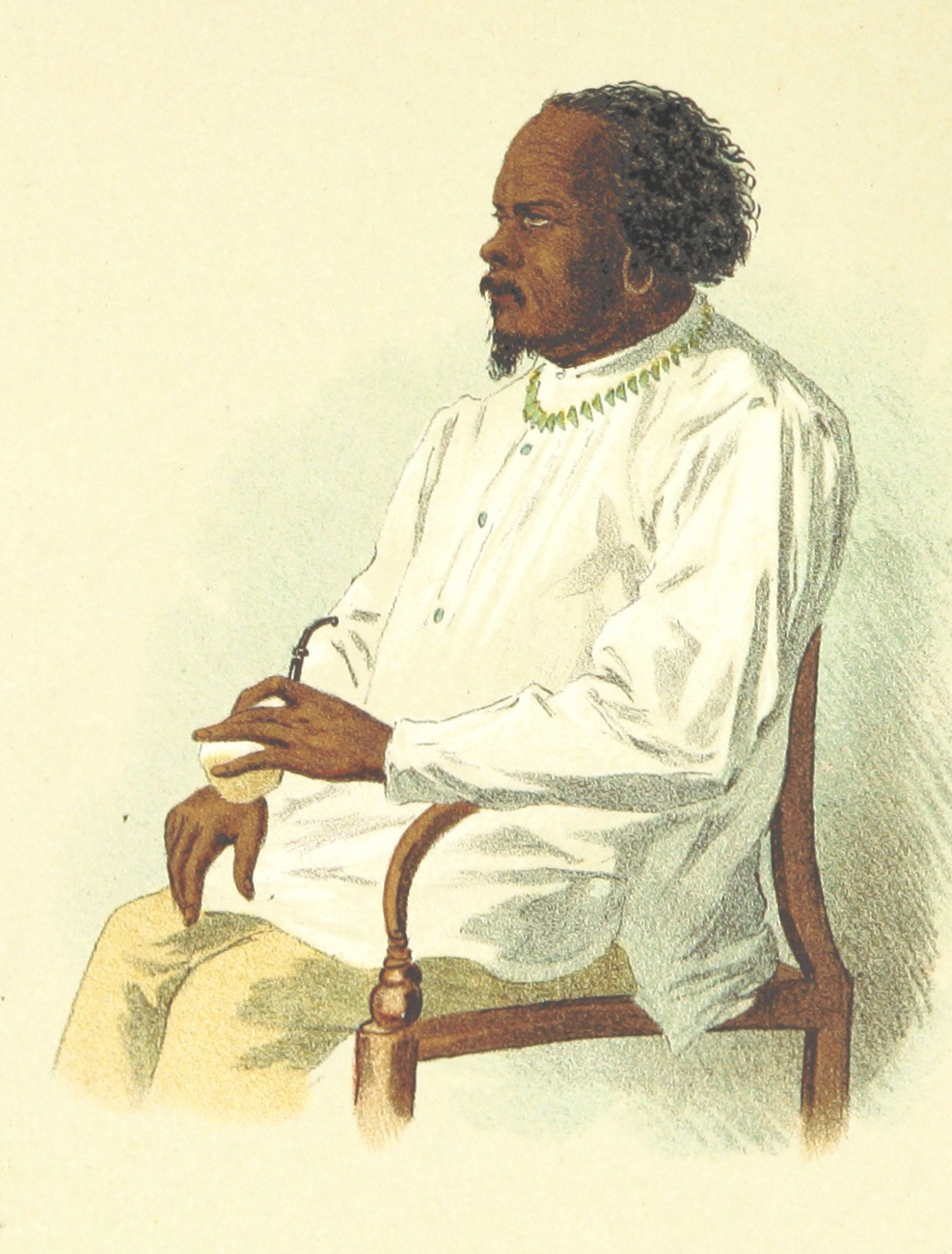
Kabua in western clothes, c. 1880

After the death of iroijlaplap Kaibuke during the typhoid outbreak of 1863, his two nephews Loiak and Kabua disputed who should succeed him as the paramount chief of the southern Ralik Chain. Loiak was the iroij of Ebon Atoll and the elder nephew, who traditionally would have succeeded his uncle, but Kabua, the iroij of Jaluit Atoll, married Kaibuke's widow, making him the step-uncle and guardian of his elder cousin. Both chiefs sought support from foreigners by befriending missionaries and working with German copra traders in order to maintain influence.

The dispute remained peaceful for twelve years, but in September 1876, the conflict nearly erupted into violence. While both chiefs were staying on Ebon, copra trader James Lyle Young reported witnessing a mob of Loiak's followers wielding muskets and preparing to attack Kabua's followers across the lagoon. Kabua fled to his land on Jaluit rather than engaging in battle. In the following months, rumors circulated that Kabua would return and start a war. Loiak staged frequent military drills on Ebon and stockpiled weapons in late 1876, but Kabua's invasion never occurred. In May 1880, Loiak's followers invaded Jaluit to challenge Kabua, who prospered from the copra trade and whom an 1878 German treaty had recognized as the "King of the Ralik Islands." The two armies met and carried firearms but did not fight, and there were no casualties. Loiak's followers returned to Ebon several days later; Kabua fled to his home at Ailinglaplap Atoll, though he later returned to Jaluit.

In the late 1870s and 1880s, armed conflicts occurred between rival chiefs on both the Majuro and Arno Atolls. On Majuro, iroij Jebrik and Rimi fought over the paramount chieftainship for several years, leaving at least 10 islanders dead before Cyprian Bridge of the passing British warship HMS Espiegle mediated a peace treaty in 1883. In 1884, Bridge also negotiated an end to a conflict between iroij Lekman and Lijiwirak on Arno, which had been ongoing since 1878. Both conflicts had disrupted copra production and caused famines as war parties destroyed rivals' coconut groves and other property. Copra traders resorted to selling firearms and ammunition to maintain profits.

=== Western political interests ===
Flag of the Ralik Islands made for the November 29, 1878, treaty signing with Germany. The Ralik Chain historically was not a unified political entity, and the flag shared the same colors as the flag of the German Empire.

In 1875, the British and German governments conducted a series of secret negotiations to divide the western Pacific in spheres of influence and counter American expansion in the region. Germany received northeastern New Guinea, the Bismarck Archipelago, and several island groups of Micronesia, including the Marshall Islands. On November 26, 1878, the German warship SMS Ariadne anchored at Jaluit to begin treaty negotiations with the iroij of the Ralik Chain. During the second day of negotiations, Captain Bartholomäus von Werner ordered his men to give a military demonstration featuring a bayonet charge, a rapid firing demonstration, and use of artillery blanks, which he later said was intended to "show the islanders, who have not seen anything like it before, the power of the Europeans." On November 29, Werner signed a treaty with Kabua and several other Ralik Chain iroij which granted the German Empire "most favored nation" status in the Ralik Chain and required iroij to guarantee the rights of German citizens. Germany secured a fuelling station at Jaluit and free use of the atoll's harbor for German vessels. The German authorities also recognized Kabua as the "King of the Ralik Islands," though the treaty required that disputes between Marshallese and Germans would be arbitrated by German ship captains.

The German Empire established a consulate on Jaluit in 1880 with Franz Hernsheim, co-founder of Hernsheim & Co., serving as the German consul to the Ralik Chain. The United States made Adolph Capelle its consul to protect the interests of American missionaries.

== German protectorate ==
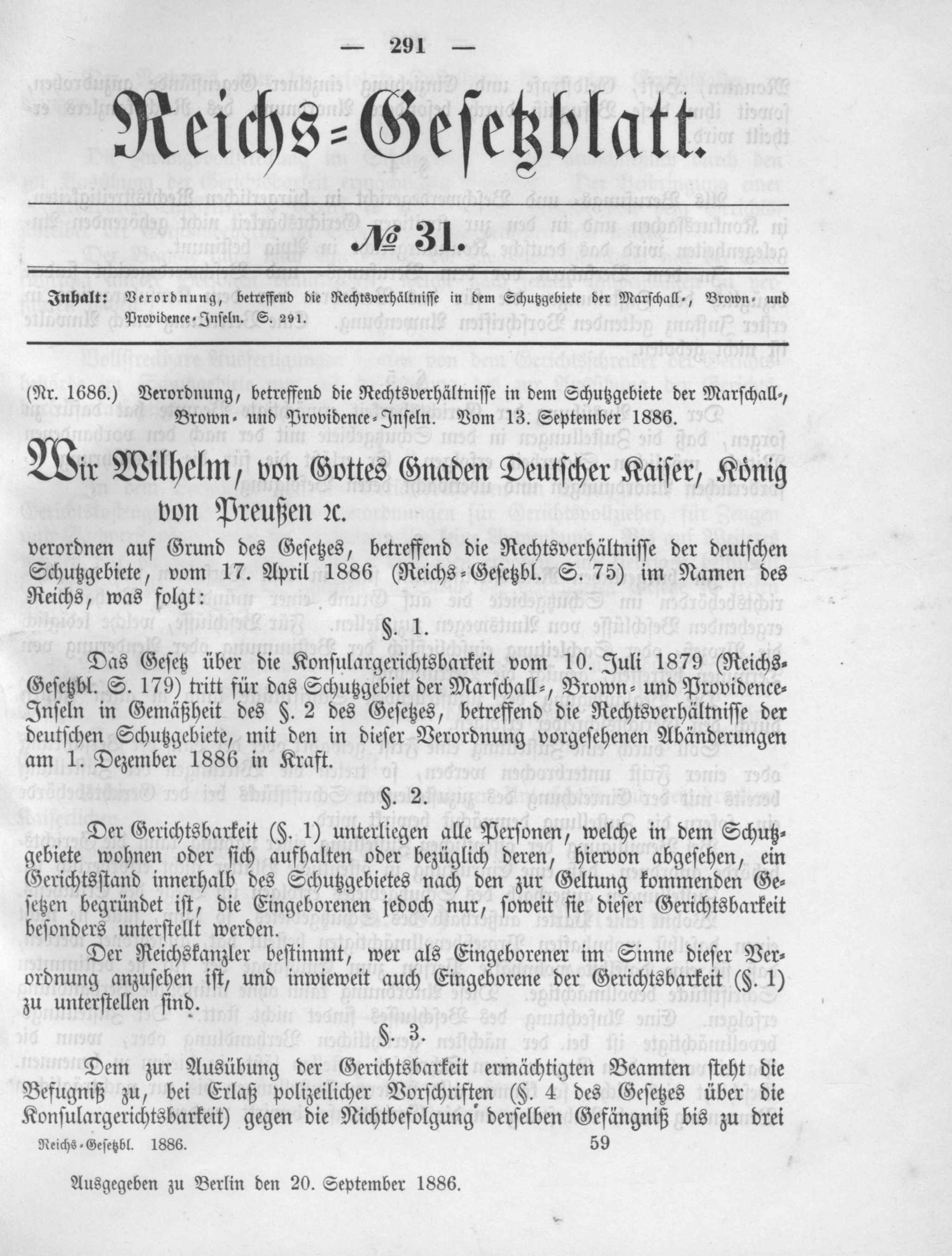
German Reich Law Gazette proclaiming the protectorate of the Marshall Islands, September 1886

Franz Hernsheim and other German business interests petitioned their government to annex the Marshall Islands into the German Empire. The United Kingdom was the primary naval power in the Pacific, and the British government agreed to German annexation of the Marshalls in exchange for German recognition of Britain's authority over the Gilbert and Ellice Islands. On August 29, 1885, Chancellor Otto von Bismarck authorized the creation of the German Protectorate of the Marshall Islands.

On October 13, 1885, the German corvette Nautilus docked at Jaluit to obtain the signatures of iroij on a treaty of protection. On October 15, iroij Kabua, Loiak, Nelu, Lagajime, and Launa signed a treaty in German and Marshallese. While the Marshallese text made no distinction of rank between the five chiefs, the German text recognized Kabua as the King of the Marshall Islands, despite the ongoing dispute between Kabua and Loiak over the paramount chieftainship. A company of marines hoisted the flag of the German Empire over Jaluit, and the Nautilus performed similar ceremonies at seven other atolls in the Marshalls, obtaining the signatures of 18 iroij, most of whom were trading partners of Hernsheim. The language of the treaty framed the creation of protectorate as a request from the iroij to seek defense from colonization by other western powers and to continue German trade. Several pro-American iroij refused to recognize the German authority until threatened with naval force in mid-1886.

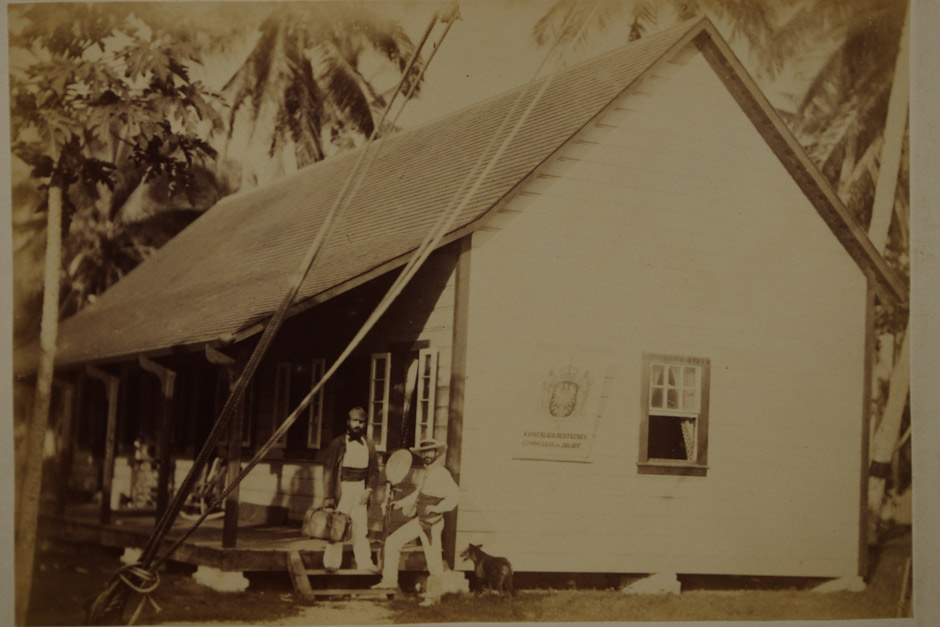
German colonial administration building at Jaluit Atoll in 1886. Wilhelm Knappe, the first Imperial Governor, stands on the left.

In April 1886, the Reichstag passed a law to create a legal foundation for colonial protectorates, giving the kaiser and his appointed governor the authority to make laws by ordinance which did not necessarily have to follow the imperial constitution. In September 1886, an imperial ordinance established the Protectorate of the Marshall Islands, and declared that German consular law would apply to all residents of the Marshall Islands, including indigenous Marshallese. The ordinance also gave the German chancellor the discretionary authority to apply extraconstitutional ordinances to the Marshallese.

Following the 1886 Anglo-German Declarations, Nauru fell within the German sphere of influence in Western Pacific and was incorporated into the Marshall Islands protectorate on April 16, 1888.

=== The Jaluit Company ===
Bismarck planned to leave the administration of colonies to chartered companies rather than having the German government directly administer overseas protectorates. Hernsheim & Co. and DHPG both initially opposed administering the colony, but relented to the German government in December 1887 and merged their interests to create the joint-stock Jaluit Company. The new company began administering the colony in January 1888. The company had the right to be consulted on all new laws and ordinances and nominated all colonial administrative staff, subject to approval by the German chancellor. The protectorate's administrative staff consisted of a governor, a secretary, and six colonial police officers. The company was responsible for paying administrative expenses for the protectorate, and collected commercial license fees and an annual poll tax. The taxation system was built upon the precolonial tribute system; iroij collected the taxes in copra on the company's behalf and were entitled to one-third of the sum total.

The Jaluit Company was the longest-lasting and most profitable German colonial joint-stock company. Profit margins rose from 5% in 1892 to 12% in 1900 and 20% in 1906. The company's licensing fees pushed out American and British competition; Crawford & Co. and Henderson & Macfarlane sold their holdings to the Jaluit Company in 1893 and 1899, respectively. After acquiring the trading stations of the British Pacific Islands Company in 1901, the Jaluit Company held a monopoly in the region. Australian firm Burns, Philp & Co. complained that the harbor fees it paid in Marshallese ports were excessive, and the British government protested the Jaluit Company's practices as a violation of the Anglo-German Declarations' free-trade provision. On March 31, 1906, the German government assumed direct control and reorganized the Marshall Islands and Nauru as part of the protectorate of German New Guinea. As compensation, the Jaluit Company received a 10% share of Pacific Phosphate Company, which began mining operations on Nauru that year. The company generated the largest dividends of any German company in the Pacific through the phosphate trade, rising from 30% in 1907 to 84% in 1913. Even after the monopoly ended, the company continued to dominate the Micronesian copra trade.

=== Life in the protectorate ===
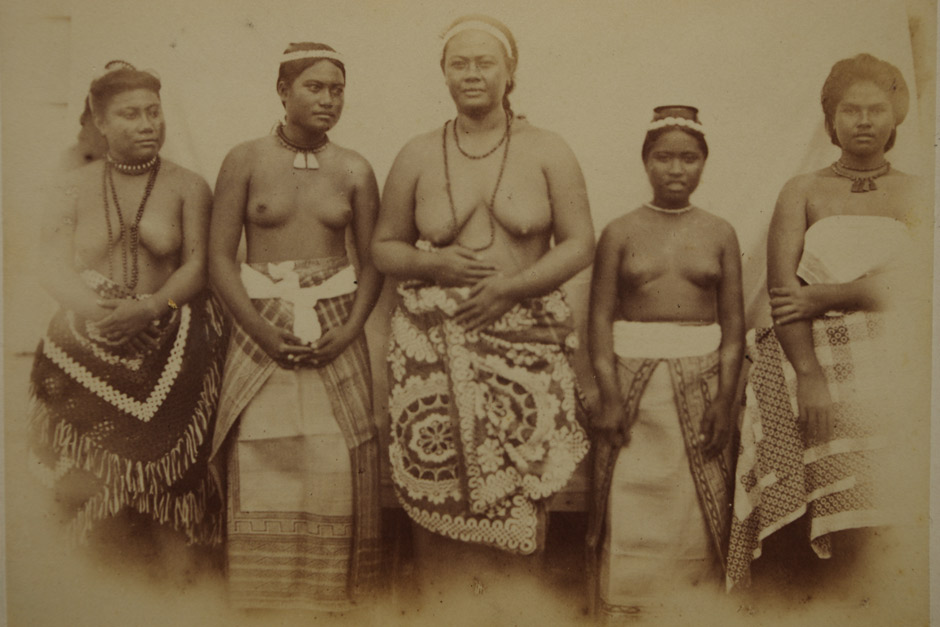
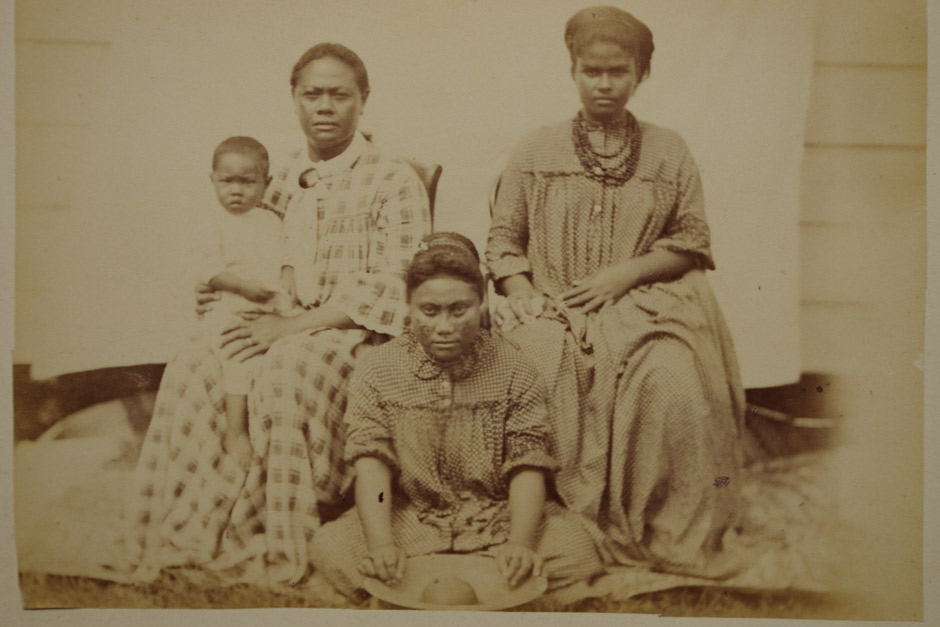
Marshallese women in the 1880s wearing traditional jaki-ed woven mats and western-style dresses

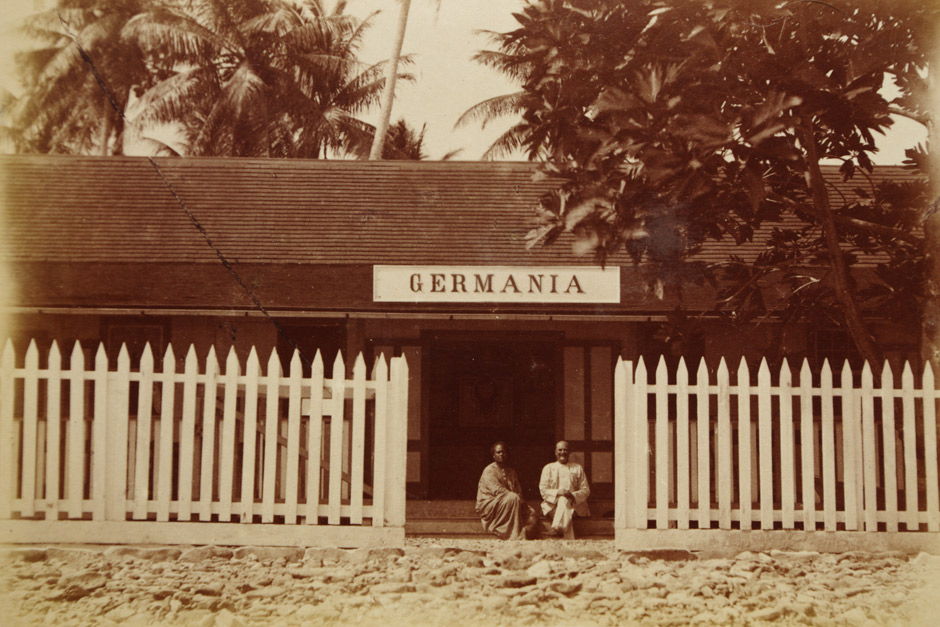
The gastwirtschaft Germania at Jabor, Jaluit

During the protectorate period, most islanders could read and write the Marshallese language and do arthimetic. In 1898, 25 mission schools operated in the islands and had 1,300 students. The German Catholic Missionaries of the Sacred Heart arrived at Jaluit in 1899, and while few Marshallese converted to Catholicism, the Catholic schools on Jaluit, Arno, and Likiep generated high demand. While Protestant missionary schools provided a three-year education, the Catholic schools gave six to eight years, including lessons in the German language.

German accounts from the protectorate period note that aspects of pre-colonial Marshallese culture were being lost in all but the remote northern atolls with little missionary influence. Most women wore smocks or dresses instead of going bare chested and wearing skirts made from woven jaki-ed mats. Few men continued the practice of wearing their hair in a topknot. Traditional crafts such as sharkskin drums and stick charts fell out of use as western products because more readily available.

In 1900, Marshallese commoners staged a general strike to demand higher pay from the Jaluit Company. The iroij pressured most laborers to return to work, but church groups on Mejit and Namdrik organized staunch resistance to the company. The company lowered its buying price for copra from the islands, which led the islanders to cease production altogether. The German authorities arrested seven leaders of the strike and blockaded the islands from 1901 to 1904. The islanders held out, and the company doubled wages in 1904. Marshallese dockworkers on Jaluit staged a similarly successful strike in 1911 to double their wages.

The Marshallese population declined by more than 30% during the protectorate period, from 13,000-15,000 prior to annexation to 9,200 in 1908. A 1905 typhoon killed approximately 200 people on Jaluit, Arno, and Mili. Hundreds of islanders died in continued outbreaks of western diseases, such as dysentery outbreaks on Ebon which killed 150 people in 1907 and 400 in 1908. The western population remained small throughout the protectorate period. Approximately 180 westerners lived in the Marshall Islands in 1914, including 76 Germans.

== Japanese mandate ==
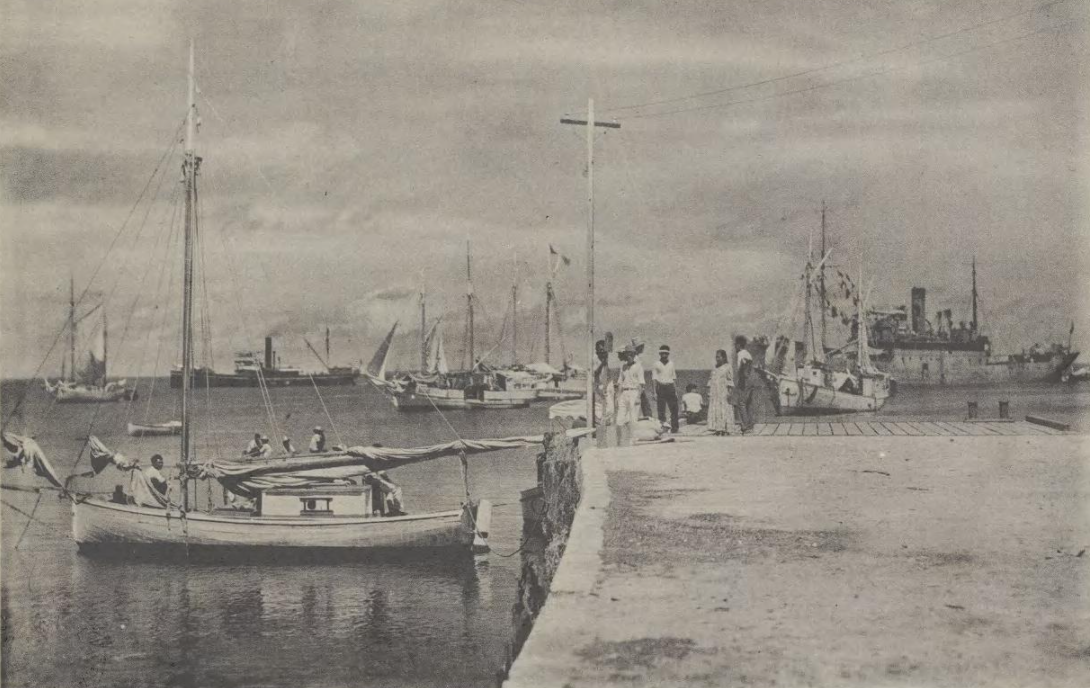
Ships in the port of Jabor, Jaluit Atoll, 1932

At the outbreak of World War I in August 1914, the United Kingdom and Empire of Japan were allies. Britain initially declined Japanese offers of naval assistance against Germany, because the British government wanted to prevent Japanese southward expansion into the Pacific. However, on August 7, the British Foreign Office requested that Japan help track down and destroy the German East Asia Squadron following reports of attacks on British ships. The request provided a pretext for the Imperial Japanese Navy to invade Germany's Pacific colonies in Micronesia and Shandong.

Japanese troops under Admiral Yamaya Tanin arrived at Enewetak on September 29, 1914, and Jaluit on September 30. An occupation force of three officers and 100 Japanese troops were stationed on Jaluit on October 3. In October, the British and Japanese governments agreed that Japan would be responsible for operations north of the equator, while British, Australian and New Zealander forces operated south of the equator. The agreement placed most of German Micronesia under Japanese military control, while Nauru came under British control. In February 1917, the British and Japanese made a secret agreement that Japan would annex Micronesia after the Allied Powers won the war. Japan later made similar agreements with France, Italy, and Russia.

In January 1919, Japanese delegate Makino Nobuaki proposed that Japan annex Germany's Pacific island colonies at the Paris Peace Conference. United States President Woodrow Wilson opposed the annexation of German colonies by the Allied Powers and argued for a system of League of Nations mandates. The Australian delegates opposed Wilson's proposal, and the conference adopted a compromise under which mandates would be divided into classes based on size and level of development. Germany's Pacific colonies north of the equator became the Japanese South Seas Mandate, a Class C mandate, which due to small size, sparse population, remoteness, and low level of development was to be governed under Japanese laws as if it were an integral part of Japanese territory. Germany ceded the Marshall Islands to Japan with the signing of the Treaty of Versailles on June 28, 1919. In August 1919, a commission determined that mandates were also not to be militarized and that Japan was not to continue expanding its territory further into the Pacific.

The United States government and military opposed Japanese annexation of Germany's Micronesian colonies and were suspicious of a secret Japanese military build up in Micronesia. The government recruited some of the few American scientists in Micronesia to gather strategic information. In 1921, geologist William Herbert Hobbs gathered intelligence while on an expedition to collect coral and volcanic samples in the Marshall Islands. In 1922 and 1923, American intelligence officer Earl Hancock Ellis posed as a commercial traveler and undertook a reconnaissance tour of Micronesia, including several months the Marshall Islands.

=== Administration ===
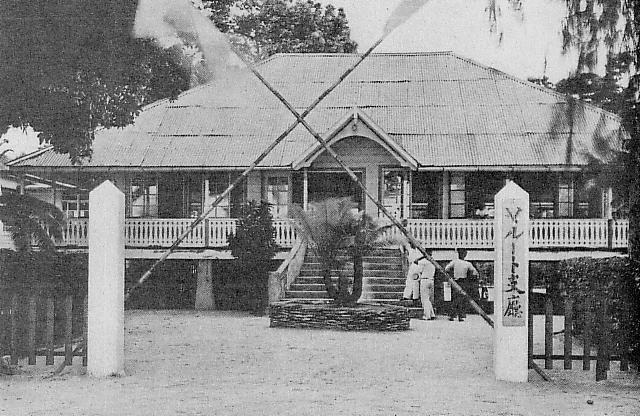
South Seas Government branch office, Jaluit, c. 1932

In December 1914, the Japanese military created the Provisional South Seas Defense Force to administer Micronesia from its command post at Truk Atoll. The military administration divided Micronesia into six naval districts, each governed by a commander: the central Carolines, governed from Truk; the eastern Carolines, governed from Ponape; the Marianas, governed from Saipan; the Marshalls, governed from Jaluit; Palau, governed from Koror; and Yap. The administration had orders to initially retain as many German-era laws as possible to enable a smooth transition to Japanese rule, though Japanese laws replaced German laws in 1915. The Japanese initially requested that German officials continue to work on behalf of the Japanese occupation, but later reversed course and deported most German settlers and officials in June 1915.

The military government implemented an embargo on most foreign ships, including those of its allies, from anchoring at harbors in the Marshall Islands. Non-Japanese foreigners needed to file a multi-step application to visit the islands with no guarantee that the government would grant permission. International mail service to Micronesia halted from 1914 to 1917 and resumed after the Anglo-Japanese secret agreement that Japan would retain the territories it had occupied after the war.

During the first months of the occupation, Japanese scientists, agricultural researchers, medical specialists and other experts and scholars conducted an extensive survey of German Micronesia to assess the islands' economic potential. The survey's final report to the Japanese government suggested that the islands' primary value was strategic, because they could enable future southward expansion. In other parts of Micronesia the Japanese undertook novel development initiatives, but the Marshall Islands had the most limited economic potential in Micronesia. The Japanese adopted the German system of having local iroij collect a poll tax in copra.

The Japanese navy garrisons withdrew from Micronesia and closed their headquarters at Truk in 1921, and the civilian South Seas Government (南洋廳, Nan'yō-chō) led by Toshiro Tezuka set up its headquarters in Koror, Palau, in April 1922. The Marshall Islands were one of six branch governments of the civil administration, and the administrative center of the district remained in Jaluit. The South Seas Government reported directly to the Prime Minister of Japan until 1929, when the government came under the authority of the Ministry of Colonial Affairs. The Japanese administration employed a much larger staff than the Germans. They also attempted to weaken the iroij by prohibiting any chief from having landholdings on more than one island. The government controlled most of the land on Jaluit, but the other Marshall Islands were among the only places in the South Seas Mandate where the government did not directly control the majority of the land.

=== Relations with Marshall Islanders ===
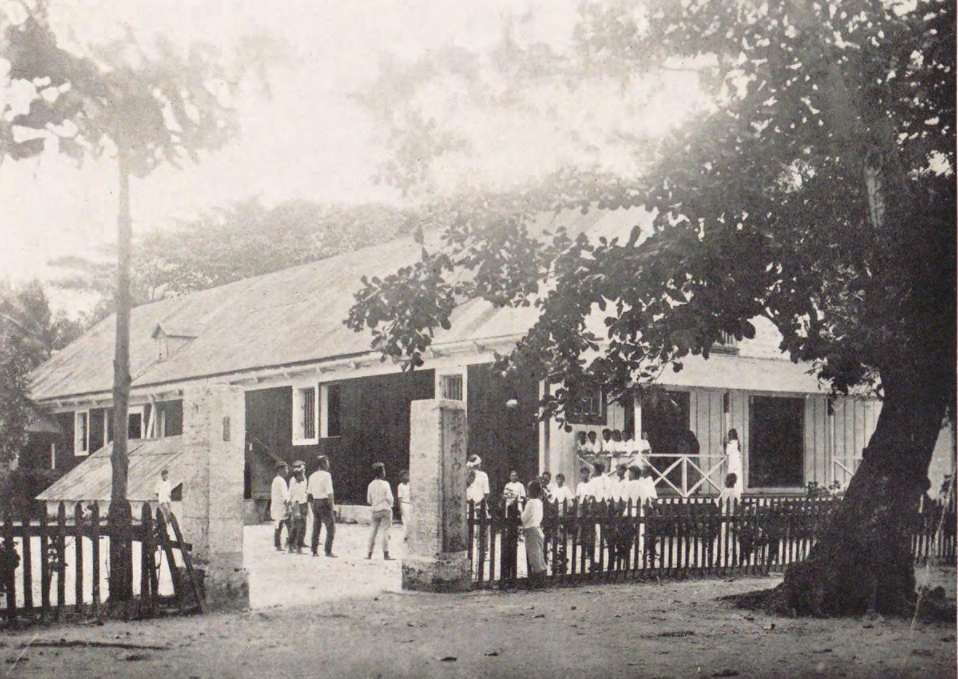
Public school in Jabor, c. 1932

The government undertook a propaganda campaign to convince Micronesians that Japanese and Micronesian people were the same race, and the authorities encouraged the Marshallese to assimilate into Japanese culture. In 1915, the military administration instituted a three-year public school system that provided education the Japanese language and gradually replaced the missionary schools. Students were forbidden to speak Marshallese in the schools and could receive corporal punishment for not speaking Japanese. More than half of school lessons were devoted to Japanese language and cultural instruction. The government implemented a system of using boats to transport students from smaller and more remote islands to schools on the larger islands, and school books and materials were free. By 1935, public school attendance was mandatory for all children within range of a school.

The government also sponsored youth associations (青年団, seinendan) devoted to Japanese activities, such as track and field, baseball, handicrafts, and song competitions. Beginning in 1915, elite Marshall Islanders received free trips to Japan to expose them to Japanese culture. Students also received tours of Japan from 1917. Islanders were responsible for some of the costs of the trips from 1926, and the tour program continued until 1939.

In practice, Japanese colonial policies treated the Marshallese as second-class citizens. Schools for Marshallese students provided a shorter education than schools for Japanese settlers in the mandate. Post-primary education for many islanders was restricted to vocational training. Few islanders could get employment in the colonial bureaucracy and they tended to receive lower wages than Japanese settlers performing the same jobs.

The Japanese had less presence and impact on the remoter atolls, where only one or two traders might be in residence at any time. Islanders on remote islands had infrequent interactions with Japanese fishermen and colonial policemen. However, islanders in remote villages gained increased access to Japanese manufactured goods through the copra trade.

The islands of the South Seas Mandate featured in the popular culture of interwar Japan. One of the earliest examples was the song "The Chieftain's Daughter" (酋長の娘, Shūchō no musume), which tells the story of a Japanese man who is rescued from drowning by a Marshallese woman. He falls in love with her and dances at a headhunter feast to win her hand in marriage. The song was adapted as a 1930 film of the same title. Scholars such as Naoto Sudo and Michael Baskett have argued that the story presents a contrast between romance and exoticized peril. Other Japanese media set in an exoticized fantasy of the South Seas Islands included the popular songs "Banana Maiden" and "South Seas Maiden" as well as the manga series Daring Dankichi.

=== Japanese settlement and development ===
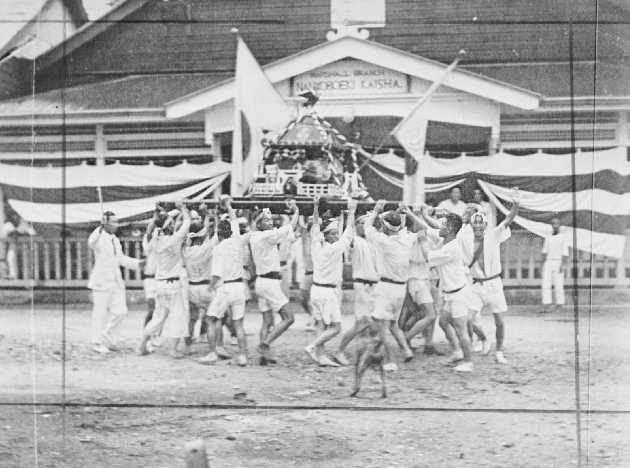
Men carry a mikoshi in front of the Jaluit office of NBK during a Kigensetsu celebration.

The Marshall Islands were the largest producer of copra in the Japanese mandate, copra being the Marshalls' largest industry as well as the second most important commodity in the mandate after sugarcane, which was largely produced in the Northern Mariana Islands. Other industries also grew in the Marshalls during the period, including phosphorus mining on Ebon as well as commercial tuna fishing and canning.

The Jaluit Company ceased operations in March 1915, and the Japanese South Seas Trading Company (南洋貿易会社, Nan'yō Bōeki Kaisha), also called NBK, and the Australian Burns, Philp & Co. took over the copra trade. NBK was able to build upon and expand the commercial infrastructure that German companies had built in the islands. The Japanese navy also granted NBK a monopoly on transporting military provisions and personnel between Japan and the islands. In 1918, the authorities attempted to increase copra yield by declaring that all land which had not been planted with coconut trees within three years would become government property.

Japanese, Koreans, and Okinawans settled in the Marshall Islands, although they formed one of the smallest settler communities in the South Seas Mandate. In 1937, the immigrant population of the Marshalls was approximately 500, while Palau had 11,000, and Truk and Ponape had 3,600 each. Marshall Islanders remained the majority of the population throughout the mandate period, unlike Palau and the Mariana Islands, where Japanese settlers became the majority. While cities significantly grew and developed in other parts of the Japanese mandate, the administrative center at Jabor, Jaluit, grew more modestly during the Japanese period. The town included port infrastructure, government offices, NBK offices and warehouses, a post office, a public school, a communications post, a hospital, a power plant, and a settlement of Okinawan fishermen, but lacked many of the commercial businesses and social establishments built in areas with larger immigrant populations. While the immigrant labor force was small, their presence drove wages in the Marshall Islands down to pre-German colonial levels.

=== Military buildup ===
On March 27, 1933, Japan declared its intentions to withdraw from the League of Nations after the league denounced the Japanese invasion of Manchuria. Japan officially withdrew from the league in 1935 but continued to control the islands. Japan maintained an ambiguous policy about the Pacific Islands until World War II, signaling that it intended to continue administering the islands while also remaining silent about whether the islands had become Japanese territory.

Japan began rearming and building up its military following its invasion of China in 1937. The Japanese navy reestablished itself in the South Seas Mandate that year and undertook the construction of civilian airfields. Military planners initially discounted the Marshalls as too distant and indefensible for extensive fortification, but as Japan developed long-range bombers, the islands became useful as a forward base to attack Australia, British colonies, and the United States. In 1939 and 1940, the navy built airfields on Kwajalein, Maloelap, and Wotje Atolls as well as seaplane facilities at Jaluit. The navy also expanded and modernized ports in the Marshalls. In February 1941, ships and troops of the Japanese 4th Fleet began arriving to garrison the newly fortified islands. The Japanese headquarters in Marshalls were at Kwajalein.

The government conscripted hundreds of Korean laborers to build the airfields and ports. Marshallese men were also conscripted to work in military camps.

== World War II ==
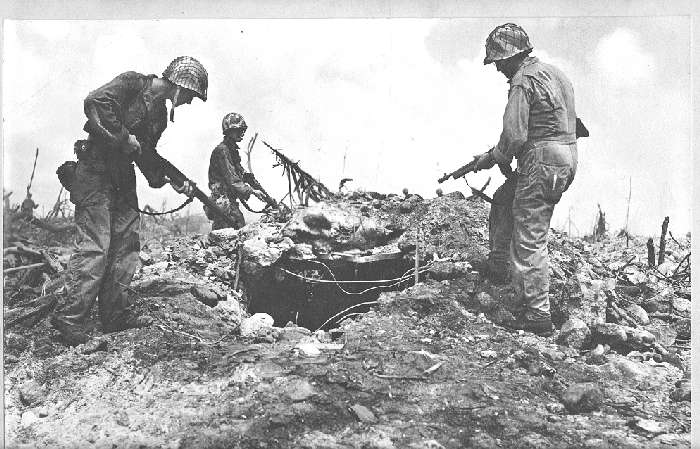
US troops inspecting a Japanese bunker, Kwajalein Atoll. 1944.

At the outbreak of the Pacific War, the Japanese air raids and landing parties of the Battle of Wake Island launched from Kwajalein, and the Japanese invasions of the Gilbert Islands and Nauru both launched from Jaluit. On February 1, 1942, the United States Pacific Fleet carried out the Marshalls–Gilberts raids, which struck Jaluit, Kwajalein, Maloelap, and Wotje. They were the first American air raids on Japanese territory.

By 1943, the Japanese navy had built airfields on Enewatak and Mili Atolls in addition to the pre-war airfields at Kwajalein, Maloelap, and Wotje.

The American invasion of the Marshall Islands began on January 31, 1944, during the Gilbert and Marshall Islands campaign. The Americans simultaneously invaded Majuro and Kwajalein. By autumn 1944, the Americans controlled all of the Marshall Islands, except for Jaluit, Maloelap, Mili, and Wotje. As the American campaign advanced through Micronesia and into the Ryukyu Islands, the four Japanese-held atolls were cut off from supplies and subject to American bombardment. The garrisons began running out of provisions in late 1944, leading to high casualties from starvation and disease. Of the 4700-man Japanese garrison on the Mili Atoll, 1600 died from starvation and disease while an additional 900 died in American air raids.

== Trust Territory of the Pacific Islands ==
Following capture and occupation by the United States during World War II, the Marshall Islands, along with several other island groups located in Micronesia, passed formally to the United States under United Nations auspices in 1947 as part of the Trust Territory of the Pacific Islands established pursuant to Security Council Resolution 21.

=== United States nuclear testing ===
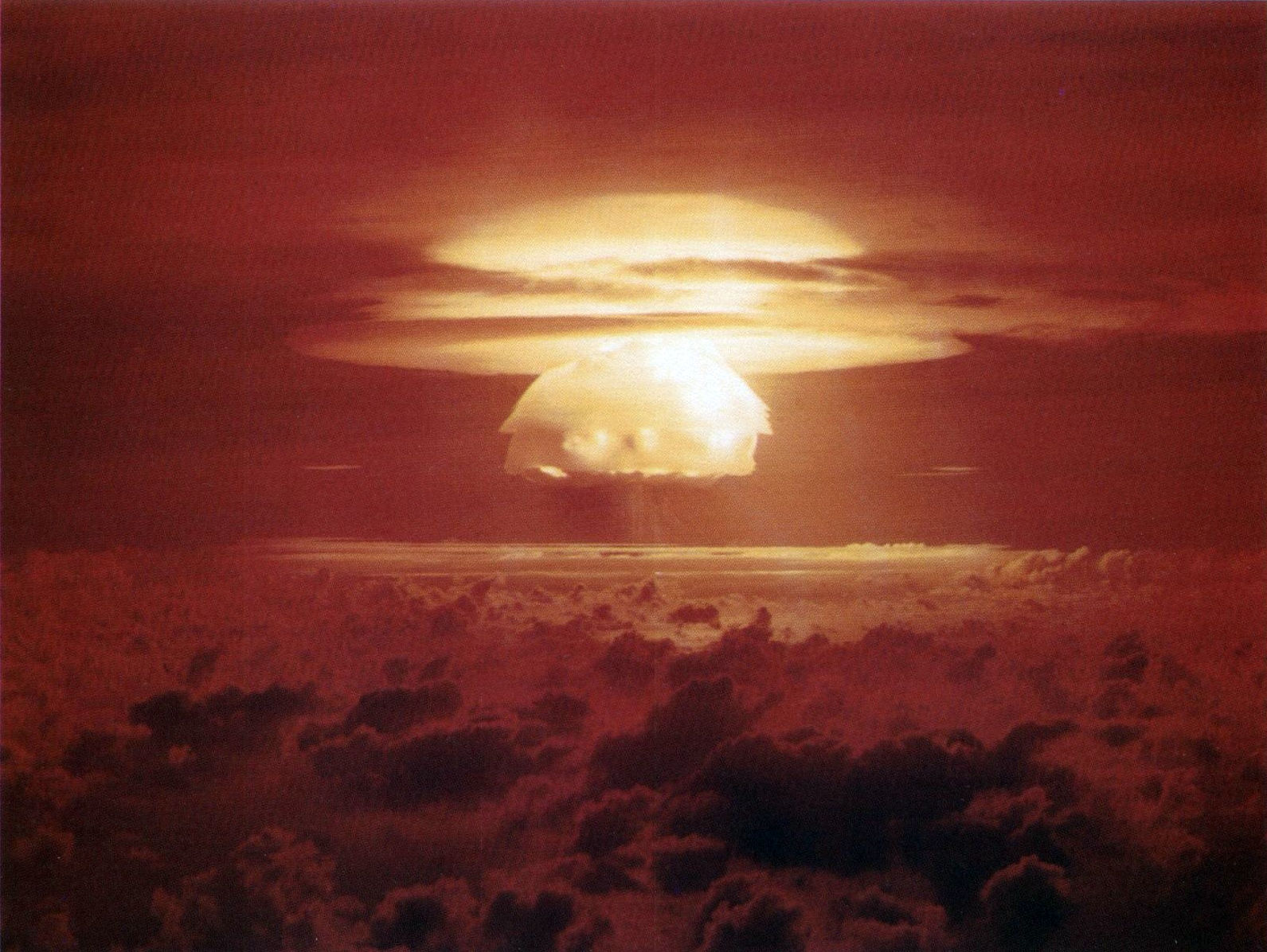
Mushroom cloud from the largest atmospheric nuclear test the United States ever conducted, Castle Bravo.

From 1946 to 1958, the early years of the Cold War, the United States tested 67 nuclear weapons at its Pacific Proving Grounds located in the Marshall Islands, including the largest atmospheric nuclear test ever conducted by the U.S., code named Castle Bravo. "The bombs had a total yield of 108,496 kilotons, over 7,200 times more powerful than the atomic weapons used during World War II." With the 1952 test of the first U.S. hydrogen bomb, code named "Ivy Mike," the island of Elugelab in the Enewetak atoll was destroyed. In 1956, the United States Atomic Energy Commission regarded the Marshall Islands as "by far the most contaminated place in the world."

Nuclear claims between the U.S. and the Marshall Islands are ongoing, and health effects from these nuclear tests linger. Project 4.1 was a medical study conducted by the United States of those residents of the Bikini Atoll exposed to radioactive fallout. From 1956 to August 1998, at least $759 million was paid to the Marshallese Islanders in compensation for their exposure to U.S. nuclear weapon testing.

== Independence ==
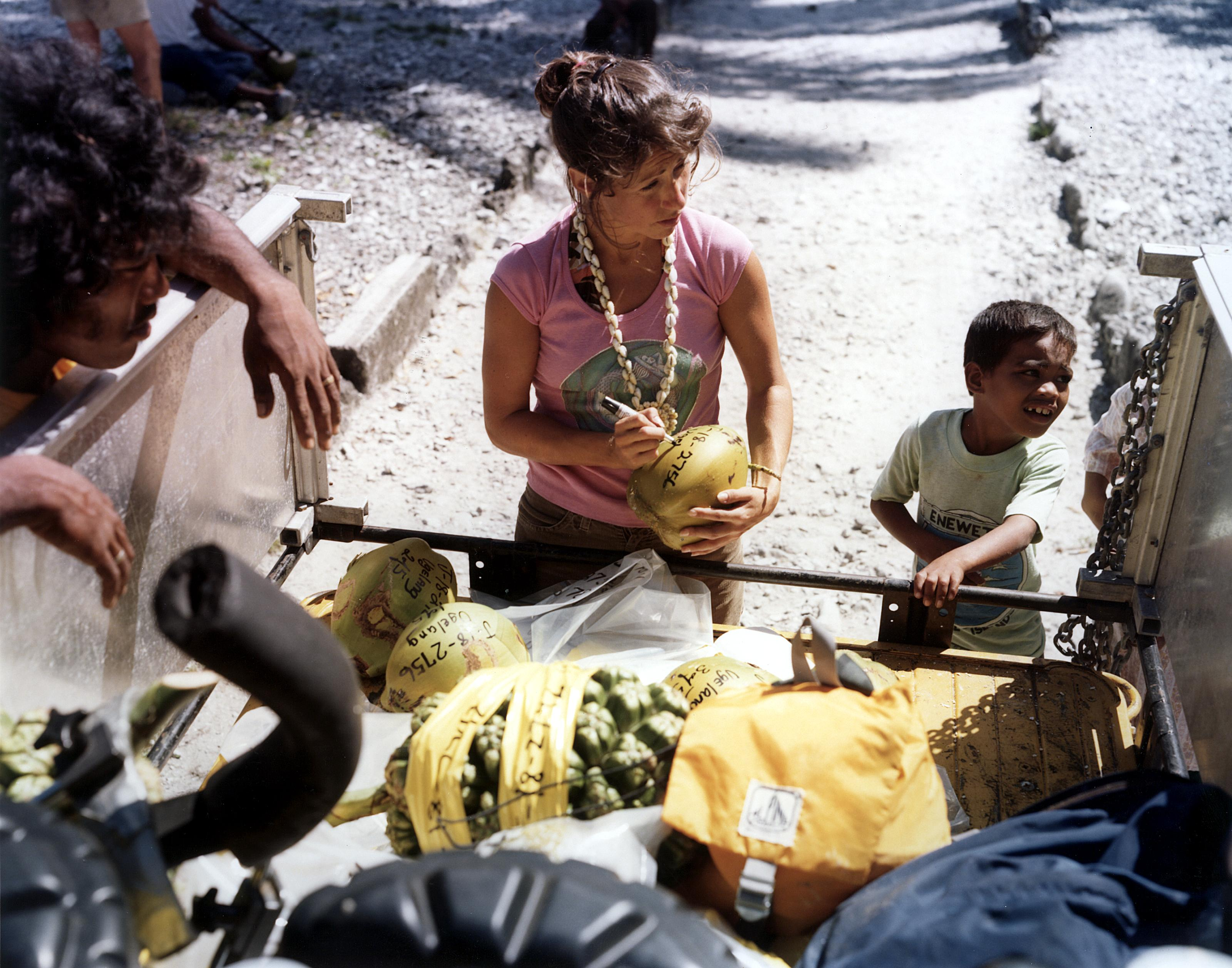
In 1978, the U.S. Department of Energy's Lawrence Livermore National Laboratory conducted a radiation survey of crops, soil, water, and livestock on Bikini and Ujelang Atolls.

In 1979, the Government of the Marshall Islands was officially established and the country became self-governing.

In 1986, the Compact of Free Association with the United States entered into force, granting the Republic of the Marshall Islands (RMI) its sovereignty. The Compact provided for aid and U.S. defense of the islands in exchange for continued U.S. military use of the missile testing range at Kwajalein Atoll. The independence procedure was formally completed under international law in 1990, when the UN officially ended the Trusteeship status pursuant to Security Council Resolution 683. The Republic was admitted to the UN in 1991.

In 2003, the US created a new Compact of Free Association for the Republic Marshall Islands and Micronesia, with funding of $3.5 billion to be made over the next 20 years.

A report in mid 2017 by Stanford University, some 70 years after 23 atomic bombs were detonated on Bikini Atoll, indicates abundant fish and plant life in the coral reefs. That area of the islands was still not habitable by humans, however, due to contamination by radioactivity. A 2012 report by the United Nations had indicated that the contamination was "near-irreversible".

In January 2020, David Kabua, son of founding president Amata Kabua, was elected as the new President of the Marshall Islands. His predecessor Hilda Heine lost the position after a vote.

In November 2025, the government of Marshall Islands introduced a national universal basic income scheme under which every resident citizen receives quarterly payments of about US$200. It is financed by a trust fund created under an agreement with the United States, which in part aims to compensate the Marshall Islands for nuclear testing. The fund holds more than $1.3bn in assets, with the USA committing a further $500m through to 2027.

=== Climate crisis ===
In 2008, extreme waves and high tides caused widespread flooding in the capital city of Majuro and other urban centres, 3 feet (0.91 m) above sea level. On Christmas morning in 2008, the government declared a state of emergency. In 2013, heavy waves once again breached the city walls of Majuro.

In 2013, the northern atolls of the Marshall Islands experienced drought. The drought left 6,000 people surviving on less than 1 liter (0.26 U.S. gal) of water per day. This resulted in the failure of food crops and the spread of diseases such as diarrhea, pink eye, and influenza. These emergencies resulted in the United States President declaring an emergency in the islands. This declaration activated support from US government agencies under the Republic's "free association" status with the United States, which provides humanitarian and other vital support.

Following the 2013 emergencies, the Minister of Foreign Affairs Tony deBrum was encouraged by the Obama administration in the United States to turn the crises into an opportunity to promote action against climate change. DeBrum demanded new commitment and international leadership to stave off further climate disasters from battering his country and other similarly vulnerable countries. In September 2013, the Marshall Islands hosted the 44th Pacific Islands Forum summit. DeBrum proposed a Majuro Declaration for Climate Leadership to galvanize concrete action on climate change.

Rising sea levels are threatening the islands which may render some uninhabitable if sea levels continue to rise. Major flooding occurred in 2014 leading to a state of emergency for Majuro. Thousands of islanders have already moved to the US over the past decades for medical treatment and for better education or employment, many settling in Arkansas; emigration is likely to increase as sea levels rise. The right of residents to do so ends in 2023 unless the Compact with the US is renewed. The United States Geological Survey in 2014 warned that rising sea levels will salinize the fresh water on the islands, "thus likely forcing inhabitants to abandon their islands in decades, not centuries, as previously thought".

== See also ==
- List of colonial governors of the Marshall Islands
- List of United States National Historic Landmarks in United States commonwealths and territories, associated states, and foreign states#NHLs in associated states
- National Register of Historic Places listings in the Marshall Islands
