= 2019 Marshallese general election =

- 18 November 2019

All 33 seats in the Nitijeļā
	First party
Party	Independents
Seats after	33
Speaker before election
Kenneth Kedi
Elected
Speaker
Kenneth Kedi

General elections were held in the Marshall Islands on 18 November 2019. Opponents of President Hilda Heine won a majority of seats.

== Background ==
The 2015 elections saw a significant defeat for the government of incumbent President Christopher Loeak, with five cabinet ministers losing their seats. Following the elections, Casten Nemra was elected as president on 4 January 2016 by a margin of one vote. However, he was removed from office two weeks later by a vote of no confidence ending 21–12 in favour of dismissing him. On 27 January 2016 Hilda Heine was elected the country's first female president. She narrowly survived a vote of no confidence on 12 November 2018; the vote was tied at 16–16 as one member of the Legislature was abroad for medical treatment.

== Electoral system ==
The 33 members of the Nitijeļā were elected in 19 single-member constituencies via first-past-the-post voting and five multi-member constituencies of between two and five seats via plurality block voting.

== Results ==
Hilda Heine and Kitlang Kabua were the only two women elected, with Kabua becoming the youngest member ever of the legislature at age 28.

Constituency	Candidate	Votes	Notes
Ailinglaplap (2)	Christopher Loeak	702	Re-elected
Ailinglaplap (2)	Alfred Alfred, Jr	516	Re-elected
Ailinglaplap (2)	Isaac Zackhras	249	
Ailuk (1)	Maynard Alfred	188	Re-elected
Ailuk (1)	Hackney Takju	121	
Arno (2)	Jiba Kabua	512	Elected
Arno (2)	Mike Halferty	418	Re-elected
Arno (2)	Arthur Jetton	375	
Arno (2)	Jejwarick Anton	343	Unseated
Aur (1)	Hilda Heine	292	Re-elected
Aur (1)	Justin Lani	196	
Ebon (1)	John Silk	276	Re-elected
Ebon (1)	Neamon Neamon	128	
Enewetak (1)	Jack Ading	282	Re-elected
Enewetak (1)	Yoster John	60	
Jabat (1)	Kessai Note	–	Re-elected unopposed
Jaluit (2)	Casten Nemra	580	Re-elected
Jaluit (2)	Jemi Nashion	446	Elected
Jaluit (2)	Daisy Alik-Momotaro	387	Unseated
Kili/Bikini/Ejit (1)	Peterson Jibas	284	Elected
Kili/Bikini/Ejit (1)	Eldon Note	204	Unseated
Kwajalein (3)	Michael Kabua	1,217	Re-elected
Kwajalein (3)	Kitlang Kabua	931	Elected
Kwajalein (3)	David Paul	817	Re-elected
Kwajalein (3)	Alvin Jacklick	671	Unseated
Lae (1)	Thomas Heine	–	Re-elected unopposed
Lib (1)	Joe Bejang	321	Elected
Lib (1)	Whitney Loeak	44	
Likiep (1)	Donald Capelle	318	Elected
Likiep (1)	Tommy Kijiner, Jr.	238	
Majuro (5)	Tony Muller	1,607	Re-elected
Majuro (5)	Stephen Phillip	1,459	Elected
Majuro (5)	Sandy Alfred	1,382	Elected
Majuro (5)	Kalani Kaneko	1,379	Re-elected
Majuro (5)	Brenson Wase	1,268	Re-elected
Majuro (5)	David Kramer	1,242	Unseated
Majuro (5)	Yolanda Lodge-Ned	1,225	
Maloelap (1)	Bruce Bilimon	304	Re-elected
Maloelap (1)	Michael Konelios	172	
Mejit (1)	Dennis Momotaro	287	Re-elected
Mejit (1)	Helkena Anni	172	
Mili (1)	Wilbur Heine	400	Re-elected
Mili (1)	Joniton Lometo	200	
Namdrik (1)	Wisely Zackhras	258	Re-elected
Namdrik (1)	Hebel Luther	155	
Namu (1)	Tony Aiseia	358	Re-elected
Namu (1)	Ace Doulatram	326	
Rongelap (1)	Kenneth Kedi	339	Re-elected
Rongelap (1)	Hilton Tonton Kendall	287	
Ujae (1)	Atbi Riklon	190	Re-elected
Ujae (1)	Waylon Muller	96	
Utrok (1)	Hiroshi Yamamura	303	Elected
Utrok (1)	Amenta Matthew	257	Unseated
Wotho (1)	David Kabua	120	Re-elected
Wotho (1)	Samantha Samson	30	
Wotje (1)	Ota Kisino	294	Elected
Wotje (1)	John Kaiko	200	
Source: Info Marshall Islands

== Presidential election ==
Incumbent President Hilda Heine lost to David Kabua, son of the former and longest President Amata Kabua.

Candidate	Party	Votes	%
David Kabua	Opposition	20	62.50
Hilda Heine	Government	12	37.50
Total		32	100.00
Total votes		32	–
Registered voters/turnout		33	96.97
