= 1965 Trust Territory of the Pacific Islands parliamentary election =

Parliamentary elections were held in the Trust Territory of the Pacific Islands on 19 January 1965.

== Background ==
Constitutional changes for the Trust Territory were made by an order from the US Secretary of the Interior on 28 September 1964. A bicameral Congress was established, with a 12-member House of Delegates (later renamed the Senate) with two members from each of the six districts and a 21-member General Assembly (later renamed the House of Representatives) with seats apportioned to each district based on their population – five from Truk, four from the Marshall Islands and Ponape, three from the Mariana Islands and Palau and two from Yap. This replaced the previous Council of Micronesia, which had been based outside the Trust Territory in Guam.

Future elections were to be held every two years in November of even-numbered years, with all members of the General Assembly and half the House of Delegates renewed at each election. In the 1965 elections, half the Delegates (one from each district) were elected for a term ending in January 1967 (following the 1966 elections) and the other half elected for a term ending in January 1969 (following the 1968 elections).

== Campaign ==
A total of 94 candidates contested the elections, of which 28 were running in the House of Delegates elections, with six running in both Palau and Ponape, and four in the Marshalls, Marianas, Truk and Yap. Although voting was meant to take place even where there was only one candidate, a misunderstanding led to Bethwel Henry being returned unopposed without a vote.

== Results ==
Of the 41,473 people thought to be eligible to vote, 35,506 registered to do so. Of these, 25,079 people voted.

=== Elected members ===
==== House of Delegates ====
District	Member	Term
Marianas	Olympio T. Borja	Four years
Marianas	Jose R. Cruz	Two years
Marshalls	Isaac Lanwi	Four years
Marshalls	Amata Kabua	Two years
Palau	John O. Ngiraked	Four years
Palau	Roman Tmetuchl	Two years
Ponape	Bailey Olter	Four years
Ponape	Eliuel Pretrick	Two years
Truk	Tosiwo Nakayama	Four years
Truk	Andon Amaraich	Two years
Yap	Francis Nuuan	Four years
Yap	Joseph Tamag	Two years
Source: Annual Report, TTPI, TTPI

==== General Assembly ====
District	Constituency	Member
Marianas	1st District	Benjamin Manglona
Marianas	2nd District	Manuel D. Muna
Marianas	3rd District	Juan A. Sablan
Marshalls	4th District	Namo Hermios
Marshalls	5th District	Henry Samuel
Marshalls	6th District	Dwight Heine
Marshalls	7th District	Atlan Anien
Palau	8th District	Lazarus Salii
Palau	9th District	Sadang Ngiraeherang
Palau	10th District	Jacob Sawaichi
Ponape	11th District	Elias Robert
Ponape	12th District	Bethwel Henry
Ponape	13th District	Max Iriarte
Ponape	14th District	Olter Poll
Truk	15th District	Smart Lampson
Truk	16th District	Petrus Mailo
Truk	17th District	Soukichi Fritz
Truk	18th District	Mitaro Danis
Truk	19th District	Chutomu Nimues
Yap	20th District	Luke Tman
Yap	21st District	John N. Rugulimar
Source: Annual Report, TTPI, TTPI

== Aftermath ==
Following the elections, Tosiwo Nakayama was elected as the President of the House of Delegates.

On 15 October 1965 Dwight Heine resigned from Congress to become District Administrator of the Marshall Islands. A by-election was held in February and April 1966 which was won by Ekpap Silk. Smart Lampson died on 13 June 1966; Naosy Pitiol was appointed to complete his term by the Acting Truk District Administrator.
