= 2015 Marshallese general election =

- 16 November 2015

All 33 seats of the Nitijeļā
| | First party |
|---|---|
| Party | Independent |
| Seats before | 33 |
| Seats after | 33 |
Speaker before election
Donald Capelle
Elected Speaker
Kenneth Kedi

General elections were held in the Marshall Islands on 16 November 2015.

== Electoral system ==
The 33 members of the Legislature were elected in 19 single-member constituencies and five multi-member constituencies of between two and five seats. The votes are cast for persons, not parties, and party membership is not listed on the ballots.

== Results ==
The results are not reported by party affiliation. The Inter-Parliamentary Union reported that 23 out of the 33 elected senators are said to belong to Kien Eo Am (KEA). However, Marianas Variety reported that neither the KEA nor the group supporting President Christopher Loeak had won a majority, and that a group of six independents controlled the balance of power. Many prominent members of the formerly ruling party Aelon̄ Kein Ad (AKA), including half the cabinet members, lost their seats. The number of female senators went up from one to three, a record high.

| Constituency | Candidate | Votes | Notes |
|---|---|---|---|
| Ailinglaplap (2) | Christopher Loeak | 760 | Elected |
| Ailinglaplap (2) | Alfred Alfred Jr. | 468 | Elected |
| Ailinglaplap (2) | Ruben Zackhras | 410 | |
| Ailinglaplap (2) | Francis Horiuchi | 178 | |
| Ailinglaplap (2) | Harney Paul | 113 | |
| Ailuk (1) | Maynard Alfred | 268 | Elected |
| Ailuk (1) | Atra Lang | 56 | |
| Arno (2) | Jejwarick H. Anton | 636 | Elected |
| Arno (2) | Mike Halferty | 469 | Elected |
| Arno (2) | Jiba B. Kabua | 374 | |
| Arno (2) | Jefferson B. Barton | 265 | |
| Arno (2) | Rumon Jorbal | 226 | |
| Arno (2) | Newton Lajuan | 188 | |
| Arno (2) | Thomas J. Lokot | 91 | |
| Aur (1) | Hilda Heine | 355 | Elected |
| Aur (1) | Justin Lani | 195 | |
| Ebon (1) | John Silk | 392 | Elected |
| Ebon (1) | Heran Bellu | 207 | |
| Enewetak (1) | Jack Ading | 321 | Elected |
| Enewetak (1) | Yoster John | 74 | |
| Jabat (1) | Kessai Note | — | Elected unopposed |
| Jaluit (2) | Casten Nemra | 436 | Elected |
| Jaluit (2) | Daisy Alik-Momotaro | 399 | Elected |
| Jaluit (2) | Rien Morris | 341 | |
| Jaluit (2) | Frederick J. de Brum | 299 | |
| Jaluit (2) | Joe D. Hanchor | 281 | |
| Jaluit (2) | Jack Jorbon | 248 | |
| Jaluit (2) | Ted J. Kiluwe | 20 | |
| Jaluit (2) | Ambi Amram | 16 | |
| Jaluit (2) | Jokane J. Bisentha | 11 | |
| Kili/Bikini/Ejit (1) | Eldon Note | 247 | Elected |
| Kili/Bikini/Ejit (1) | Hinton Johnson | 196 | |
| Kili/Bikini/Ejit (1) | Alson Kelen | 195 | |
| Kili/Bikini/Ejit (1) | Tony Juda | 25 | |
| Kili/Bikini/Ejit (1) | Maika Leviticus | 11 | |
| Kwajalein (3) | Michael Kabua | 1,211 | Elected |
| Kwajalein (3) | David Paul | 987 | Elected |
| Kwajalein (3) | Alvin Jacklick | 912 | Elected |
| Kwajalein (3) | Tony deBrum | 660 | |
| Kwajalein (3) | Jeban Riklon | 560 | |
| Kwajalein (3) | Steve Dribo | 330 | |
| Kwajalein (3) | Ataji L. Balos | 129 | |
| Lae (1) | Thomas Heine | 298 | Elected |
| Lae (1) | Elmer A. Langbata | 72 | |
| Lib (1) | Jerakoj J. Bejang | 268 | Elected |
| Lib (1) | Aeto Bantol | 102 | |
| Likiep (1) | Leander Leander Jr. | 541 | Elected |
| Likiep (1) | Donald Capelle | 394 | |
| Likiep (1) | Huston Lokeijak | 123 | |
| Majuro (5) | Sherwood Tibon | 2,924 | Elected |
| Majuro (5) | Tony Muller | 2,872 | Elected |
| Majuro (5) | Brenson Wase | 2,598 | Elected |
| Majuro (5) | David Kramer | 2,585 | Elected |
| Majuro (5) | Kalani Kaneko | 2,140 | Elected |
| Majuro (5) | Phillip Muller | 1,660 | |
| Majuro (5) | Evelyn Lanki | 1,421 | |
| Majuro (5) | Biuma Samson | 1,318 | |
| Majuro (5) | John Niedenthal | 622 | |
| Majuro (5) | Jim Philippo | 587 | |
| Majuro (5) | Allen Lanki | 341 | |
| Majuro (5) | Caster Konou | 309 | |
| Majuro (5) | Cornelius Langmos | 183 | |
| Maloelap (1) | Bruce Bilimon | 381 | Elected |
| Maloelap (1) | Michael Konelios | 297 | |
| Maloelap (1) | Charles T. Domnick | 154 | |
| Mejit (1) | Dennis Momotaro | 270 | Elected |
| Mejit (1) | Helkena J. Anni | 215 | |
| Mejit (1) | Barry Rilang | 20 | |
| Mili (1) | Wilbur Heine | 362 | Elected |
| Mili (1) | Stevenson Kotton | 99 | |
| Mili (1) | Tadashi Lometo | 50 | |
| Mili (1) | Losan Chinoska | 7 | |
| Namdrik (1) | Mattlan Zackhras | 269 | Elected |
| Namdrik (1) | Amatlain E. Kabua | 159 | |
| Namu (1) | Tony Aiseia | 409 | Elected |
| Namu (1) | Ace Doulatram | 345 | |
| Namu (1) | Nena Kilma | 34 | |
| Rongelap (1) | Kenneth Kedi | 283 | Elected |
| Rongelap (1) | Hilton T. Kendall | 240 | |
| Ujae (1) | Waylon Muller | 73 | |
| Ujae (1) | Atbi Riklon | 69 | Elected after recount |
| Ujae (1) | Danny Heron | 68 | |
| Ujae (1) | Caios Lucky | 59 | |
| Ujae (1) | Carlson Heine | 38 | |
| Ujae (1) | Melvin Majmeto | 13 | |
| Ujae (1) | Hideo Milne | 9 | |
| Utrok (1) | Amenta Matthew | 348 | Elected |
| Utrok (1) | Hiroshi V. Yamamura | 286 | |
| Wotho (1) | David Kabua | 143 | Elected |
| Wotho (1) | Wesley D. Lemari | 26 | |
| Wotje (1) | Litokwa Tomeing | — | Elected unopposed |
Source: Psephos

== Aftermath ==
On 4 January 2016 the Legislature elected Casten Nemra as president by a margin of one vote. However, he was dismissed two weeks later after a parliamentary no confidence vote ended 21–12 in favour. On 27 January 2016, a second election was held, resulting in Hilda Heine becoming the country's first female president.
