= 1970 Trust Territory of the Pacific Islands parliamentary election =

Parliamentary elections were held in the Trust Territory of the Pacific Islands on 3 November 1970.

== Electoral system ==
The bicameral Congress consisted of a 12-member Senate with two members from each of the six districts and a 21-member House of Representatives with seats apportioned to each district based on their population – five from Truk, four from the Marshall Islands and Ponape, three from the Mariana Islands and Palau and two from Yap.

Elections were held every two years in November of even-numbered years, with all members of the House of Representatives and half the Senate (one member from each district) renewed at each election.

== Results ==
=== Senate ===
District	Elected Member	Notes
Marianas	Edward Pangelinan	
Marshalls	Amata Kabua	Re-elected
Palau	Roman Tmetuchl	Previously a Representative
Ponape	Ambilos Iehsi	
Truk	Andon Amaraich	Re-elected
Yap	Petrus Tun	
Source: TTPI

=== House of Representatives ===
District	Constituency	Elected Member	Notes
Marianas	1st District	Felipe Atalig	
Marianas	2nd District	Carlos Shoda	
Marianas	3rd District	Herman Q. Guerrero	
Marshalls	4th District	Charles Domnick	Re-elected
Marshalls	5th District	Henry Samuel	Re-elected
Marshalls	6th District	Ekpap Silk	Re-elected
Marshalls	7th District	Ataji Balos	Re-elected
Palau	8th District	Timothy Olkeriil	Results annulled
Palau	9th District	George Ngirarsaol	Results annulled
Palau	10th District	Tarkong Pedro	Results annulled
Ponape	11th District	Joab Sigrah	Re-elected
Ponape	12th District	Bethwel Henry	Re-elected
Ponape	13th District	Heinrich Iriarte	Re-elected
Ponape	14th District	Olter Paul	Re-elected
Truk	15th District	Raymond Setik	Re-elected
Truk	16th District	Sasauo Haruo	Re-elected
Truk	17th District	Endy Dois	Re-elected
Truk	18th District	Masao Nakayama	Re-elected
Truk	19th District	Hans Wiliander	Re-elected
Yap	20th District	John Mangefel	Re-elected
Yap	21st District	John N. Rugulimar	Re-elected
Source: TTPI, Highlights

== Aftermath ==
Following the elections, the Progressive Party submitted a petition to annul the election results in Palau, where the Liberal Party had won all four contested seats (Roman Tmetuchl in the Senate and George Ngirarsaol, Timothy Olkeriil and Tarkong Pedro in the House of Representatives). The Progressives claimed that non-registered people had been able to vote, and ballots had been tampered with. A Senate committee subsequently recommended that the election of Tmetuchl be annulled. However, the Senate voted to allow Tmetuchl to take his seat, although the election of the three Palau House of Representatives members was annulled.

When the newly elected Congress met, Bethwel Henry of Ponape was re-elected Speaker of the House of Representatives and Amata Kabua of the Marshall Islands was re-elected President of the Senate.

The by-election for the three House of Representatives seats in Palau was held on 30 March, with Polycarp Basilius, Olkeriil and Pedro elected.
