= Raphael Moonfel =

Micronesian physician and politician

Member of the Senate
- In office 1969–1973
- Preceded by: Francis Nuuan
- Succeeded by: John Mangefel
- Constituency: Yap

Personal details
- Died: 28 September 1977 (aged 47) Yap, TTPI

Raphael Moonfel (died 28 September 1977) was a Micronesian physician and politician. He served as a member of the Senate of the Trust Territory of the Pacific Islands between 1969 and 1973.

After becoming a physician, Moonfel served as Director of Health Services in Yap.

He contested the Yap Senate seat in the 1968 congressional elections, defeating incumbent Francis Nuuan. He ran for re-election in 1972, but was heavily defeated by John Mangefel. Now in failing health, he did not return to the Department of Public Health after losing his seat.

Moonfel died of kidney failure in 1977, survived by his wife Elizabeth and ten children.
