= 1974 Trust Territory of the Pacific Islands parliamentary election =

Parliamentary elections were held in the Trust Territory of the Pacific Islands on 5 November 1974. Carmen Bigler became the first female member of Congress after being elected to House of Representatives from the Fifth District of the Marshall Islands.

== Electoral system ==
The bicameral Congress consisted of a 12-member Senate with two members from each of the six districts and a 21-member House of Representatives with seats apportioned to each district based on their population – five from Truk, four each from the Marshall Islands and Ponape, three each from the Mariana Islands and Palau, and two from Yap.

Elections were held every two years in November of even-numbered years, with all members of the House of Representatives and half the Senate (one member from each district) renewed at each election.

== Results ==
Twelve incumbent members of Congress were defeated, including Marianas Senator Edward Pangelinan, Truk Senator Andon Amaraich, Marianas representative Felipe Atalig and Marshallese representative John Heine, who was unseated by Bigler.

=== Senate ===
District	Elected Member	Notes
Marianas	Pedro Agulto Tenorio	
Marshalls	Amata Kabua	Re-elected
Palau	Roman Tmetuchl	Re-elected
Ponape	Ambilos Iehsi	Re-elected
Truk	Nick Bossy	
Yap	Petrus Tun	Re-elected
Source: Highlights, Highlights

=== House of Representatives ===
District	Constituency	Elected Member	Notes
Marianas	1st District	Jose Mafnas	
Marianas	2nd District	Herman Guerrero	
Marianas	3rd District	Oscar Rasa	
Marshalls	4th District	Charles Domnick	Re-elected
Marshalls	5th District	Carmen Bigler	
Marshalls	6th District	Ekpap Silk	Re-elected
Marshalls	7th District	Ataji Balos	Re-elected
Palau	8th District	Kuniwo Nakamura	
Palau	9th District	Polycarp Basilius	Re-elected
Palau	10th District	Isidoro Rudimch	
Ponape	11th District	Joab Sigrah	Re-elected
Ponape	12th District	Bethwel Henry	Re-elected
Ponape	13th District	Resio Moses	Re-elected
Ponape	14th District	Edgar Edwards	
Truk	15th District	Raymond Setik	Re-elected
Truk	16th District	Sasauo Haruo	Re-elected
Truk	17th District	Chiro Albert	
Truk	18th District	Lambert Aafin	
Truk	19th District	Kalisto Refonopei	
Yap	20th District	Luke M. Tman	Re-elected
Yap	21st District	John Haglelgam	
Source: Highlights, Highlights

== Aftermath ==
Following the elections, Tosiwo Nakayama was re-elected President of the Senate, whilst Bethwel Henry was re-elected Speaker of the House of Representatives.

The election of three members – Lambert Aafin, Chiro Albert and Edgar Edwards – was challenged, with claims of irregularities. The Credential Committee recommended overturning the election of Aafin, ordering a by-election and launching a criminal investigation into the officials involved in the case. However, in a secret ballot, members of Congress voted to allow Aafin to take his seat by a vote of 9–8.
