= 1978 Marshallese general election =

General elections were held in the Marshall Islands on 22 December 1978.

== Results ==
Sixty candidates contested the 14 seats in the Legislature. In addition to the elected members, the Marshallese former members of the Congress of the Trust Territory of the Pacific Islands were appointed at-large members of the Legislature; these included senators Amata Kabua and Wilfred Kendall and representatives Ataji Balos, Chuji Chutaro, John Heine, Ekpap Silk and Ruben Zackhras.

Constituency	Elected member
First District	Kunar Abner
First District	Namo Hermios
First District	Tom Kijiner
Second District	Jack Jorban
Second District	Jina Lavin
Second District	Lerok Leben
Second District	Henry Samuel
Third District	Carl Heine
Third District	Watak Kabua
Third District	Evelyn Konou
Third District	Litokwa Tomeing
Fourth District	Jeton Anjain
Fourth District	Imata Kabua
Fourth District	Botland Loeak
Source: Highlights
