= David Ramarui =

Palauan politician (1925–1984)

Minister of Social Services
- In office 1982–1984

Member of the TTPI Senate
- In office 1967–1970
- Preceded by: Roman Tmetuchl
- Succeeded by: Roman Tmetuchl
- Constituency: Palau

Personal details
- Born: 1925; Ngchesar, South Seas Mandate
- Died: 7 April 1984 (aged 59); Koror, Palau

David Ramarui (1925 – 7 April 1984) was a Palauan politician. He served as a member of the Senate of the Trust Territory of the Pacific Islands (TTPI) prior to Palau separating from the territory, and then as Minister of Social Services in the Palauan government.

== Biography ==
Ramarui was born in Ngchesar in 1925 into a large family, one of eleven siblings. He was educated at the Mokko Gakko school during the South Seas Mandate era, before attending the Marianas Area Teacher Training College in Guam. Following World War II he began working as a teacher. He worked at the Palau Islands Intermediate School in Palau and remained involved in education for the remainder of his career. In 1953 he spent a year at the University of Hawaiʻi High School and then continued to the University. Having had to work part-time to pay for his course, in 1957 he received a fellowship to continue studying at the university, which he graduated from in June 1958.

In the late 1950s he became a member of the Palau Congress, and was a delegate of the islands to the Inter-District Advisory Committee (later the Council of Micronesia), and was its Vice-Chairman from 1960 to 1963. In 1962 he became Education Administrator for Palau, a role he held until 1968.

He contested the 1965 elections to the TTPI Senate, losing to Roman Tmetuchl. However, he defeated Tmetuchl in the 1966 elections. He served as a Senator until the 1970 elections. In 1971 he was appointed Deputy Director of Education of the TTPI, and two years later became Director.

After Palau separated from the Trust Territory, Ramarui ran for the presidency in the 1980 elections, finishing last in a field of five candidates. He was appointed Minister of Social Services in October 1982, a role he held until his death in Koror in April 1984. He was given a state funeral.
