= 1976 Trust Territory of the Pacific Islands parliamentary election =

Parliamentary elections were held in the Trust Territory of the Pacific Islands on 2 November 1976, except in Palau, where they were delayed until 7 December due to a legal challenge over redistricting. They were the last territory-wide elections; the planned elections in 1978 were cancelled as the territory was split into the Federated States of Micronesia, the Marshall Islands and Palau.

== Electoral system ==
The bicameral Congress consisted of a 12-member Senate with two members from each of the six districts and a 22-member House of Representatives with seats apportioned to each district based on their population – seven from Truk, five from the Marshall Islands, four from Ponape, three from Palau, two from Yap and one from the new district of Kosrae. The Marianas district (which had previously elected three representatives) ceased to exist when the Northern Mariana Islands became a US commonwealth in 1975.

Elections were held every two years in November of even-numbered years, with all members of the House of Representatives and half the Senate (one member from each district) renewed at each election. Two senators were elected from the new district of Kosrae in 1976.

== Results ==
=== Senate ===
District	Elected Member	Notes
Kosrae	Joab Sigrah	Previously a representative
Kosrae	Hirosi Ismael	
Marshalls	Wilfred Kendall	Re-elected
Palau	Kaleb Udui	
Ponape	Bailey Olter	Re-elected
Truk	Tosiwo Nakayama	Re-elected
Yap	John Mangefel	Re-elected
Source: Highlights, Highlights

=== House of Representatives ===
District	Constituency	Elected Member	Notes
Kosrae	1st District	Kasuo Isisaki	
Marshalls	1st District	John Heine	
Marshalls	2nd District	Chuji Chutaro	
Marshalls	3rd District	Ekpap Silk	Re-elected
Marshalls	4th District	Ruben Zackhras	
Marshalls	5th District	Ataji Balos	Re-elected
Palau	1st District	Kuniwo Nakamura	Re-elected
Palau	2nd District	Polycarp Basilius	Re-elected
Palau	3rd District	Isidoro Rudimch	Re-elected
Ponape	1st District	Daro Weital	
Ponape	2nd District	Kikuo Apis	
Ponape	3rd District	Edgar Edwards	Re-elected
Ponape	4th District	Bethwel Henry	Re-elected
Truk	1st District	Sasauo Haruo	Re-elected
Truk	2nd District	Chiro Albert	
Truk	3rd District	Julio Akapito	
Truk	4th District	Raymond Setik	Re-elected
Truk	5th District	Lambert Aafin	Re-elected
Truk	6th District	Hans Wiliander	
Truk	7th District	Kalisto Refonopei	Re-elected
Yap	1st District	Luke M. Tman	Re-elected
Yap	2nd District	John Haglelgam	Re-elected
Source: Highlights, Highlights

== Aftermath ==
Following the elections, Tosiwo Nakayama was re-elected President of the Senate, whilst Bethwel Henry was re-elected Speaker of the House of Representatives.
