= Francis Nuuan =

Micronesian educator and politician

Member of the Senate
- In office 1965–1969
- Succeeded by: Raphael Moonfel
- Constituency: Yap

Personal details
- Born: 1936; Aff, Yap, South Seas Mandate
- Died: 26 December 1972; Guam

Francis Nuuan (1936 – 26 December 1972) was a Micronesian educator and politician. He served as a member of the Senate of the Trust Territory of the Pacific Islands between 1965 and 1969.

== Biography ==
Nuuan was born in 1936 in the village of Aff in Tomil municipality on Yap. After graduating from the Pacific Islands Central School in Kolonia in 1951, he spent a year at the Territorial College of Guam before studying at the University of Hawaiʻi for two years. Returning to Micronesia, he worked a headteacher of Gaaneley School in Yap and then as a teaching supervisor. He subsequently became a political and economic advisor and was appointed treasurer of the Yap District Legislature. He was also a member of the Board of Education, a director of the SEA Credit Union and president of Yap Coop.

Having served as a member of the Council of Micronesia, in 1965 Nuuan was elected to its successor, the Congress of the Trust Territory of the Pacific Islands as one of the two Senators for Yap, serving until the 1968 elections when he was defeated by Raphael Moonfel. He did not actively contest the November 1972 elections, but received 250 write-in votes.

Nuuan died in Guam in December 1972 after being hit by a car while walking in Barrigada.
