= 1974 Trust Territory of the Pacific Islands Constitutional Convention election =

Constitutional Convention elections were held in the Trust Territory of the Pacific Islands on 4 June 1974. Voters elected 42 members of a constitutional convention that would draw up a proposed constitution for an independent Micronesian state.

== Background ==
The TTPI Congress approved legislation for the convention in March 1974; the bill was subsequently signed into law by Deputy High Commissioner Peter Tali Coleman.

It was opposed by the Marshall Islands, whose District Legislature passed a resolution opposing participation in the convention in April. As a result, only ten candidates contested the nine seats in the Marshall Islands, with two seats having no candidates.

== Results ==
Only one woman, Mary Lanwi, was elected to the Convention.

== Aftermath ==
Following the elections, Congress attempted to declare the elections in the Marshall Islands null and void. However, the move was vetoed by High Commissioner Edward E. Johnston.

Held in Saipan, the Convention began on 12 July 1975 and lasted until 8 November. Tosiwo Nakayama was elected president of the convention.

Delegates drafted a constitution with 16 articles, providing for a unicameral legislature with each district electing one member for a four-year term and a number of representatives for two-year terms depending on their population. A president and vice president would be selected from the members serving four-year terms.
