= 1968 Trust Territory of the Pacific Islands parliamentary election =

Parliamentary elections were held in the Trust Territory of the Pacific Islands on 5 November 1968, except in the Marshall Islands, where they were delayed until 20 December due to an outbreak of flu.

== Electoral system ==
The bicameral Congress consisted of a 12-member Senate with two members from each of the six districts and a 21-member House of Representatives with seats apportioned to each district based on their population – five from Truk, four from the Marshall Islands and Ponape, three from the Mariana Islands and Palau and two from Yap.

Elections were held every two years in November of even-numbered years, with all members of the House of Representatives and half the Senate (one member from each district) renewed at each election.

== Results ==
=== Senate ===
District	Elected Member	Notes
Marianas	Olympio T. Borja	Re-elected
Marshalls	Isaac Lanwi	Re-elected
Palau	Lazarus Salii	Previously a Representative
Ponape	Bailey Olter	Re-elected
Truk	Tosiwo Nakayama	Re-elected
Yap	Raphael Moonfel	
Source: US Department of State

=== House of Representatives ===
District	Constituency	Elected Member	Notes
Marianas	1st District	Benjamin Manglona	Re-elected
Marianas	2nd District	Nicholas Palacios	
Marianas	3rd District	Felix Rabauliman	
Marshalls	4th District	Charles Domnick	
Marshalls	5th District	Henry Samuel	Re-elected
Marshalls	6th District	Ekpap Silk	Re-elected
Marshalls	7th District	Ataji Balos	
Palau	8th District	Roman Tmetuchl	
Palau	9th District	Polycarp Basilius	Re-elected
Palau	10th District	Minoru Ueki	
Ponape	11th District	Joab Sigrah	Re-elected
Ponape	12th District	Bethwel Henry	Re-elected
Ponape	13th District	Heinrich Iriarte	
Ponape	14th District	Olter Paul	
Truk	15th District	Raymond Setik	Re-elected
Truk	16th District	Sasauo Haruo	
Truk	17th District	Endy Dois	
Truk	18th District	Masao Nakayama	
Truk	19th District	Chutomu Nimues	Re-elected
Yap	20th District	John Mangefel	
Yap	21st District	John N. Rugulimar	Re-elected
Source: US Department of State

== Aftermath ==
The newly elected Congress met for the first time on 13 January 1969. Bethwel Henry was elected Speaker of the House of Representatives and Amata Kabua was elected president of the Senate.

Hirosi Ismael (elected in 1966) resigned from the Senate. In the January 1969 by-election, Ambilos Iehsi was elected to replace him. Chutomu Nimues resigned from the House of Delegates later in 1969. Hans Wiliander was elected in the subsequent by-election on 20 November 1969. Minoru Ueki also resigned from Congress, and was replaced by Tarkong Pedro, who won the by-election on 2 April 1970.
