= Carmen Bigler =

Marshallese educator, civil servant and politician

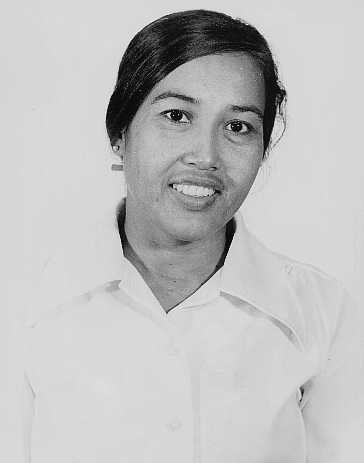

Member of the House of Representatives
- In office 1975–1977
- Preceded by: John Heine
- Succeeded by: Chuji Chutaro
- Constituency: Marshalls 5th District

Personal details
- Born: 19 July 1939 (age 86); Kosrae, South Seas Mandate

Carmen Milne Bigler (born 19 July 1939) is a Marshallese educator, civil servant and former politician. She was the first and only woman to serve in the Congress of the Trust Territory of the Pacific Islands.

== Biography ==
Bigler was born in Kosrae in 1939, the fourth of five children. She attended Mwot Christian School, where her father James was a teacher. The family returned to the Marshall Islands, where she attended school in Majuro, before studying at Pacific Islands Central School in Pohnpei between 1959 and 1961, becoming only the second Marshallese girl to graduate.

She began working as a teacher at Marshall Islands Intermediate School in 1961, before studying for a BA in anthropology at the University of Hawaiʻi between 1963 and 1967, becoming the first woman from the Marshall Islands to earn a university degree. After returning to the Marshall Islands, she taught at Marshall Islands High School until 1969, also attending summer sessions at the University of Guam and the University of Hawaiʻi in 1968 and 1969. She married an American, and had three children. In 1969 she was appointed Community Action Agency Coordinator for the Marshall Islands. She became the Marshalls' Adult Basic Education Specialist in 1971, and in May 1974 she was appointed to the Marshalls Board of Education.

Bigler contested the Marshalls 5th District of the Trust Territory House of Representatives in the 1974 elections, running an American-style campaign with bumper stickers, posters and newspaper adverts. She convincingly defeated incumbent representative John Heine by 729 votes to 372, becoming the first woman elected to Congress. However, she lost her seat in the 1976 elections, losing to Chuji Chutaro, who had finished third behind her and Heine in 1974. Congress was dissolved three years later with no other woman having won a seat.

In 1977 she was appointed Director of Public Affairs in the Marshall Islands, later becoming Internal Affairs Secretary when the islands gained self-government. She subsequently became State Historic Preservation Officer, helping found the Alele Museum. In 2003 she attempted a return to politics, running in the five-seat Majuro constituency in the general elections that year. However, she finished twelfth out of fifteen candidates.
