= Petrus Mailo =

Micronesia politician

Member of the House of Representatives
- In office 1965–1967
- Succeeded by: Sasauo Haruo
- Constituency: Moen

Member of the Truk Congress
- In office 1957–1962

Mayor of Moen
- In office 1947–1971
- Preceded by: Albert Mailo
- Succeeded by: Fuchita Bossy

Personal details
- Born: 27 December 1902; Mwan, German New Guinea
- Died: 12 September 1971 (aged 68); Moen, TTPI

Petrus Mailo (27 December 1902 – 12 September 1971) was a Micronesian chief and politician. He served as chief and mayor of Moen from 1944 and was a member of both the Truk Congress and the House of Representatives of the Trust Territory of the Pacific Islands.

== Biography ==
Born in Mwan in 1902, Mailo was educated at the Protestant Mission School at Anopouou. After leaving school in 1914, he worked on a trading boat between 1915 and 1920.

The Japanese authorities appointed Mailo to the post of secretary of Moen island in 1932. The following year, he succeeded his uncle as Chief of Nepukos village. In 1936 he became Leader of Section No. 2 of Moen island, holding the role until 1938. Between 1939 and 1944 he was employed by the Japanese government as an advisor on native affairs.

In 1947 he became Chief of Moen, succeeding his brother Albert. In 1957 the position was reconstituted as a mayoral post and made elective, with Mailo elected to the post. In the same year, he was elected to Truk Congress, serving as president of the legislature in 1957 and 1958. He also became president of the Truk Trading Company.

In 1965 Mailo was elected to the General Assembly of the new Congress of the Trust Territory of the Pacific Islands as the Moen representative. The body was later renamed the House of Representatives and Mailo was re-elected in 1966, remaining in office until the 1968 elections. He subsequently served on the board of Air Micronesia.

He died in Truk Hospital in September 1971 at the age of 68, survived by wife Chimako and eleven children.
