= Elias Robert (politician) =

Micronesian politician

Member of the House of Representatives
- In office 1965–1967
- Succeeded by: Joab Sigrah
- Constituency: 11th District, Ponape

Personal details
- Born: 16 February 1931; Pingelap, South Seas Mandate
- Died: 24 June 1978 (aged 46); Majuro, TTPI

Elias Robert (16 February 1931 – 24 June 1978) was a Micronesian politician. He served as a member of the House of Representatives of the Trust Territory of the Pacific Islands between 1965 and 1966.

== Biography ==
Born on Pingelap in February 1931, Robert studied at the University of Hawaii, graduating with a BA in education in 1964. He contested the first elections to the Congress of the Trust Territory of the Pacific Islands in 1965, winning a seat in the House of Representatives, representing the 11th District of Ponape, which covered Kosrae and Pingelap. He was defeated by Joab Sigrah in the 1966 elections. During the 1960s he was also a member of the Ponape District Legislature.

Robert subsequently worked for the Ponape Education Department, serving as Associate Assistant Director of the Ponape branch of the Community College of Micronesia between 1973 until 1976. He also returned to the University of Hawaii, earning an MA in educational administration in 1975. However, when he returned to the territory the same year, he became a patient at the hemodialysis unit at Majuro Hospital. He died in June 1978 and was buried on Ponape, survived by his wife Elihna and six children.
