= Namo Hermios =

Marshallese chief and politician (born 1981)

Member of the Marshall Islands Legislature
- In office –1981
- Succeeded by: Charles Domnick
- Constituency: First District (–1979); Maloelap Atoll (1979–1981)

Member of the TTPI House of Representatives
- In office 1965–1968
- Succeeded by: Charles Domnick
- Constituency: Marshalls 4th District

Personal details
- Died: March 27, 1981 (aged 53); Majuro, Marshall Islands

Iroij Namo Hermios (died 27 March 1981) was a Marshallese chief and politician. He served as a member of the House of Representatives of the Trust Territory of the Pacific Islands between 1965 and 1968, and as a member of the Marshall Islands Legislature until his death.

== Biography ==
Hermios worked for the Marshall Islands Import-Export Company. He became Iroij of the northern islands of the Ratak Chain, and served in the House of Iroij, the upper house of the Marshallese legislature.

In 1965 he was elected to the new House of Delegates of the TTPI Congress representing the Marshalls 4th District. He was re-elected in 1966, serving until the 1968 elections. He later became a member of the Marshallese Legislature and was elected vice president in 1975. He was re-elected from the First District in 1978 and then from the Maloelap Atoll constituency in 1979.

He died on 27 March 1981 at the age of 53, shortly after returning from a trip to Hawaii for a check on his leukaemia.
