= 1972 Trust Territory of the Pacific Islands parliamentary election =

Parliamentary elections were held in the Trust Territory of the Pacific Islands on 7 November 1972.

== Electoral system ==
The bicameral Congress consisted of a 12-member Senate with two members from each of the six districts and a 21-member House of Representatives with seats apportioned to each district based on their population – five from Truk, four from the Marshall Islands and Ponape, three from the Mariana Islands and Palau and two from Yap.

Elections were held every two years in November of even-numbered years, with all members of the House of Representatives and half the Senate (one member from each district) renewed at each election.

== Results ==
=== Senate ===
District	Elected Member	Notes
Marianas	Olympio T. Borja	Re-elected
Marshalls	Wilfred Kendall	
Palau	Lazarus Salii	Re-elected
Ponape	Bailey Olter	Re-elected
Truk	Tosiwo Nakayama	Re-elected
Yap	John Mangefel	Previously a representative
Source: Highlights

=== House of Representatives ===
District	Constituency	Elected Member	Notes
Marianas	1st District	Felipe Atalig	Re-elected
Marianas	2nd District	Pedro Pangelinan Tenorio	
Marianas	3rd District	Herman Q. Guerrero	Re-elected
Marshalls	4th District	Charles Domnick	Re-elected
Marshalls	5th District	John Heine	
Marshalls	6th District	Ekpap Silk	Re-elected
Marshalls	7th District	Ataji Balos	Re-elected
Palau	8th District	Timothy Olkeriil	Re-elected
Palau	9th District	Polycarp Basilius	Re-elected
Palau	10th District	Tarkong Pedro	Re-elected
Ponape	11th District	Joab Sigrah	Re-elected
Ponape	12th District	Bethwel Henry	Re-elected
Ponape	13th District	Resio Moses	
Ponape	14th District	Sungiwo Hadley	
Truk	15th District	Raymond Setik	Re-elected
Truk	16th District	Sasauo Haruo	Re-elected
Truk	17th District	Endy Dois	Re-elected
Truk	18th District	Masao Nakayama	Re-elected
Truk	19th District	Machime O'Sonis	
Yap	20th District	Luke M. Tman	
Yap	21st District	John N. Rugulimar	Re-elected
Source: Highlights

== Aftermath ==
Following the elections, Tosiwo Nakayama became President of the Senate, whilst Bethwel Henry was re-elected Speaker of the House of Representatives.
