= Dwight Heine =

Marshallese politician

District Administrator of the Marshall Islands
- In office 1965–1969
- Preceded by: Peter Tali Coleman
- Succeeded by: Robert D. Law

Speaker of the TTPI House of Representatives
- In office 1965
- Succeeded by: Bethwel Henry

Member of the TTPI House of Representatives
- In office 1965
- Succeeded by: Ekpap Silk
- Constituency: Marshalls 6th District

Personal details
- Born: 12 October 1919; Ebon Atoll, South Seas Mandate
- Died: 13 November 1984 (aged 65); Majuro, Marshall Islands

Dwight Heine (12 October 1919 – 13 November 1984) was a Marshallese politician. He was both a member and speaker of the Marshall Islands Congress, Congress of Micronesia and the House of Representatives of the Trust Territory of the Pacific Islands, before serving as District Administrator of the Marshall Islands from 1965 to 1969.

== Biography ==
Heine was born in October 1919 on Ebon Atoll, the grandson of Australian-born Congregationalist missionary Carl Heine. He had four siblings, including the educator and activist Mary Lanwi. He was homeschooled until the age of 14 and then attended a mission school in Jabat Island, before progressing to the advanced school on Kosrae, where he studied from 1936 to 1938. He then returned to the Marshall Islands to work as a teacher. However, after a year teaching he was required by the Japanese to work in phosphate pits, where he spent most of World War II. During the war his parents were executed by the Japanese and he acted as a scout for American troops as they invaded the territory. After the Americans won control of the islands, he worked as a guide and interpreter.

Heine then became the first Micronesian to attend an American college on a scholarship, studying at the University of Hawaiʻi between 1948 and 1950. After a brief stint teaching at the Pacific Islands Central School, he became a superintendent of primary schools in the Marshall Islands, as well as president of the Marshall Islands Import Export Company. In 1952 he was awarded a United Nations fellowship to study public school administration, spending time in Fiji, New Zealand and Samoa. He later became District Educational Administrator for the Marshalls. During the 1950s he also appeared at the United Nations to protest atomic bomb tests at Bikini Atoll, after which he was temporarily removed from his position in the civil service. He returned to the University of Hawaiʻi in 1957, graduating with a BA in 1959, becoming the first Micronesian to earn a college degree. He was later awarded an honorary doctorate by Oakland City College.

He was elected to the Marshall Islands Congress, serving as its president. In 1961 he also became a member of the new Congress of Micronesia, and was its first Speaker. When the body was converted to the Congress of the Trust Territory of the Pacific Islands in January 1965, he contested the first elections to the lower house, the General Assembly (later renamed the House of Representatives), and was elected from the Marshalls 6th District. Following the elections, he was elected Speaker of the Assembly. However, in October 1965 he was appointed District Administrator of the Marshall Islands, resigning his seat in Congress. His appointment made him the first Micronesian to hold such office.

He served as District Administrator until 1969, after which he became special consultant to the High Commissioner, a position he held until he retired in 1980. He died in Majuro in November 1984 at the age of 65.
