= Kandhi A. Elieisar =

Micronesian politician

Kandhi A. Elieisar is a Micronesian politician.

== Life and work ==
Elieisar graduated from the University of California, Berkeley, with a degree in sociology, and studied public administration at California State University, San Bernardino.

He worked for the Supreme Court of the Federated States of Micronesia for six years, and was then recruited by the Foreign Affairs Department, where he served for 24 years in various positions before heading the Pacific-Asia-Africa-Multilateral Affairs Division. In January 2013, he was appointed consul general in Hawaii.

In December 2019, he was appointed to the position of Minister of Foreign Affairs, succeeding Lorin S. Robert.
