= Associate justice =

Judge of a court other than the chief justice

An associate justice or associate judge (or simply associate) is a judge of a court other than the chief justice in some jurisdictions. The title "Associate Justice" is used for members of the Supreme Court of the United States and some state supreme courts, and for some other courts in Commonwealth of Nations countries, as well as for members of the Supreme Court of the Federated States of Micronesia, a former United States Trust Territory. In other common law jurisdictions, the equivalent position is called "Puisne Justice".

In several Canadian courts, the term "associate judge" has the same meaning as a Master (judiciary).

== Commonwealth ==
The function of associate justices vary depending on the Court they preside in. In the Australian state of New South Wales, associate justices of the New South Wales Supreme Court hear civil trials and appeals from lower courts amongst other matters. Associate justices can sit either as a single judge or may sit on the New South Wales Court of Appeal.

In New Zealand, associate judges of the High Court of New Zealand supervise preliminary processes in most civil proceedings. Associate judges have jurisdiction to deal with such matters as: summary judgment applications, company liquidations, bankruptcy proceedings, interlocutory applications, and some other types of civil proceedings. Associate judges in New Zealand were known as masters from 1987 until 2004.

== Micronesia ==
Under the Constitution of Micronesia, the Supreme Court "consists of the Chief Justice and not more than 5 associate justices". However, as of October 2020 there are only two associate justices in office: Beauleen Carl-Worswick and Larry Wentworth.

== United States ==
In the United States, judicial panels are non-hierarchical, so an associate judge has the same responsibilities with respect to cases as the chief judge but usually has fewer or different administrative responsibilities than the chief.

=== Supreme Court ===
Under the Judiciary Act of 1869, there are eight Associate Justices on the Supreme Court of the United States. The most junior associate justice (currently Justice Ketanji Brown Jackson) has additional responsibilities to the other associate justices: taking notes of decisions and answering the door in private conference and serving on the Supreme Court's cafeteria committee.

== See also ==
- Puisne judge
