= Congress of Micronesia =

Congress of Micronesia may refer to either:

- Congress of the Federated States of Micronesia
- Congress of the Trust Territory of the Pacific Islands
