= Mary Lanwi =

Marshallese activist

Mary Heine Lanwi was an educator, activist, and promotor of traditional handicrafts in the Marshall Islands. A female pioneer on the islands, she has been described as "perhaps the first Marshallese woman to begin employment outside the home." In 1974, she was the only woman elected to serve as a delegate to the Micronesian Constitutional Convention.

== Early life and education ==
Mary Heine was born February 22, 1921, on Jaluit Atoll in the Marshall Islands. Her mother, Grace, was from Ebon Atoll, while her father, Claude Heine, was the son of Australian-born missionary Carl Heine and his Marshallese wife Arbella from Namdrik Atoll. She had two sisters and two brothers, including the politician Dwight Heine.

After beginning her education at her parents' day school, she was sent to the Jabwor Training School, a missionary-run all-girls school on her atoll. Then, in 1937, she moved with her family to Kosrae, an island in what is now the Federated States of Micronesia, where she studied at Mwot Christian School until 1940. On her graduation day that year, she married her childhood friend and classmate Isaac Lanwi. He would go on to become a doctor and prominent resident of the islands, later elected as a senator in the Congress of Micronesia, and the couple had nine children.

== Career ==
After finishing her education, Mary Lanwi started teaching in mission schools, beginning with her alma mater on Kosrae, becoming "perhaps the first Marshallese woman to begin employment outside the home," although this work was unpaid due to the missions' rules against compensating female staff. In 1943, when World War II reached the then Japanese-controlled islands, she left Kosrae and moved to Laura on the Marshall Islands' Majuro Atoll, where she taught at the mission school there. She subsequently taught at the Rongrong Christian School from 1945 to 1948. During the war, Lanwi's parents and grandfather died in Japanese custody.

From 1948 to 1957, Lanwi took a break from teaching to raise her family. When she returned to teaching in 1957, at the Marshall Islands Intermediate School, it would be the first time she was paid for her work.

Lanwi is also known for her work in support of women's interests, which began during her time as a teacher at the Marshall Islands Intermediate School in the late 1950s; she has been described as "one of the early role models for Marshallese women," inspiring them to work outside the home. Starting in 1958, she served for nearly two decades as the islands' women's interest officer. In this role, she organized some 50 women's clubs, as well as Girl Scout troops, and oversaw extensive training programs for women and girls.

In tandem with her women's empowerment work, she promoted the islands' handicraft industry, seeing its potential to allow Marshallese women to financially support their families. In 1967, she organized the 50 women's clubs together into the Handicraft Co-op, a Majuro-based organization that purchased and sold traditional Marshallese handicrafts. With the co-op's success, Lanwi stepped down as women's interest officer in 1976 and began overseeing the co-op full-time, which she continued until her retirement around 1995.

In 1974, Lanwi was elected as the only female delegate to the Micronesian Constitutional Convention, representing Ebon Atoll. Ahead of the Alele Museum's opening in the early 1980s, she served on its founding board, described an "instrumental" in its creation. Other prominent roles in this period included on the Trust Territory of the Pacific Islands' Planning Council and Private Industry Council.

== Later years ==
Details on Lanwi's later life are scant, with last recorded mention of her in 2004, and she died sometime before 2025.
