= Carl Heine =

Australian missionary (1870–1944)

The Reverend Carl Heine
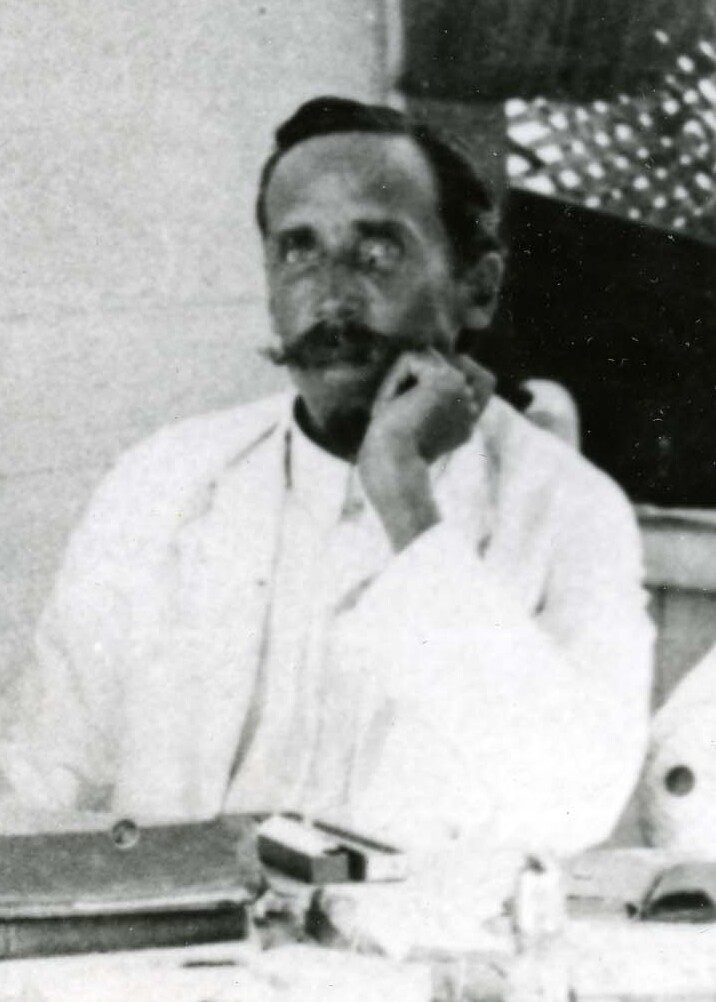
- Born: 28 June 1870; Singleton, New South Wales, Australia
- Died: c. April 1944 (aged 73); Jaluit, Marshall Islands, South Seas Mandate
- Cause of death: Executed by beheading
- Relatives: Dwight Heine (grandson); Mary Lanwi (granddaughter); Hilda Heine (granddaughter)

Carl Russell Heine (28 June 1870 – c. April 1944) was an Australian-born missionary in the Marshall Islands. He arrived in the islands in 1896 as a sailor and settled on Jaluit Atoll, marrying a Marshallese woman. Ordained as a Congregationalist minister in 1906, he worked for the American Board of Commissioners for Foreign Missions (ABCFM) and what is now the United Church of Christ – Congregational in the Marshall Islands. He was detained by Japanese troops during World War II and executed by beheading in 1944, along with two family members.

== Early life ==
Heine was born in Singleton, New South Wales, Australia. He was of German descent on his paternal side.

Heine first arrived in the Marshall Islands in 1890 – then a German protectorate – as a sailor on the merchant barque George Noble. He was an agent of the New Zealand trading firm Henderson and McFarlane Ltd, dealing in coconut oil and copra. In 1892, Heine became ill with dysentery while ashore at Namorik Atoll. He was nursed back to health by two Marshallese sisters, Arbella and Nenij, who were teachers in the local Sunday school. He married Arbella and chose to remain in the Marshall Islands. After her death in childbirth, he married her sister Nenij in accordance with Marshallese custom.

== Missionary work ==
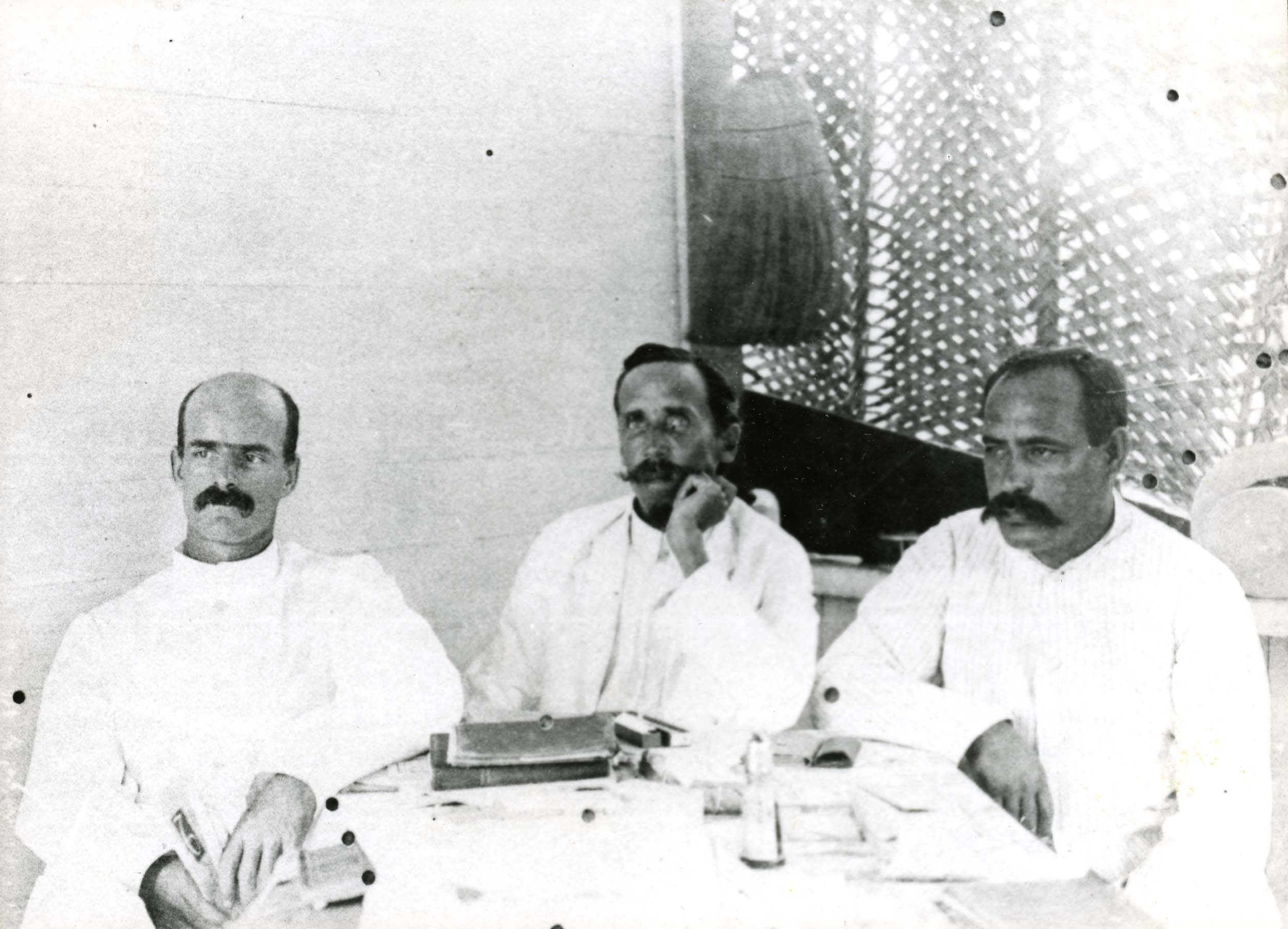
Heine (centre) with German businessman Adolph Capelle and Portuguese merchant Joachim DeBrum, possibly at the Debrum House on Likiep Atoll

According to his biographer John Garrett, after recovering from his illness Heine experienced an "evangelical conversion within the Marshallese church, a classic re-birth" leading him to become involved in church work. He became fluent in Marshallese, and incorporated local beliefs into Christian practices.

In 1906, Heine was ordained as a Congregationalist minister by the American Board of Commissioners for Foreign Missions (ABCFM), commonly known as the Boston Mission. He ran a mission school on Jaluit Atoll with around 250 students and a Christian Endeavour section with around 300 members. In about 1931, Heine organised an association of atoll churches in response to increased activity from Japanese missionaries. The organisation met every two years, with Marshallese evangelists given the opportunity to participate in framing mission policy. The meetings were banned by the Japanese during World War II but were revived in 1946 and ultimately developed into the United Church of Christ – Congregational in the Marshall Islands (UCCCMI).

After World War I, the Marshall Islands became part of the Japanese-administered South Seas Mandate. Heine and other ABCFM missionaries, including Jessie Hoppin, visited Japan on a number of occasions, and he had contacts in the Imperial Japanese Navy. One of his great-grandchildren was named after the Japanese Protestant missionary Joseph Nijima. Heine wrote a number of articles for Pacific Islands Monthly on the Japanese administration, including a 1937 article titled "In Defence of Japan" which refuted criticisms made by the Permanent Mandates Commission.

=== Detention and execution ===
Following the attack on Pearl Harbor in 1941 and the outbreak of the War in the Pacific, most Americans withdrew from the Marshall Islands leaving Heine in charge of ABCFM activities.

Heine was regarded with suspicion by Japanese troops. Unlike his younger family members, he had not learned to speak Japanese during the period of civilian administration. He was given the option to leave the islands, but preferred to remain with his family and was placed under house arrest. He and his wife were placed in solitary confinement upon the commencement of U.S. bombing raids in 1942.

Heine was executed by beheading by the Japanese authorities in April 1944, along with his son Claude and daughter-in-law Grace. The executions were witnessed by Claude's 12-year-old son John.

== Personal life and legacy ==
Heine had one child from his first marriage to Arbella and eight children from his second marriage to her sister Nenij. He established a "a large and influential family", with a number of descendants marrying into other part-European families. His grandchildren Dwight Heine, Mary Lanwi, Carl Heine, and Hilda Heine have all been prominent public figures, with Hilda serving multiple terms as president of the Marshall Islands.

In 2019, the board of Global Ministries adopted a resolution honouring Heine on behalf of the Christian Church (Disciples of Christ) and United Church of Christ. A plaque was presented to his granddaughter Hilda Heine.

== Sources ==
- Garrett, John (1994). "Unintentionally a Missionary: Carl Heine, an Australian in the Marshall Islands" (PDF). South Pacific Journal of Mission Studies (11). South Pacific Association for Mission Studies: 16–20.
- Garrett, John (1997). Where Nets Were Cast: Christianity in Oceania Since World War II. Suva, Fiji: Institute of Pacific Studies.
