= Nitijela fire =

2025 Marshall Islands fire

- Date: 26 August 2025; 12 months ago
- Venue: Nitijela
- Location: Majuro, Marshall Islands
- Cause: TBD
- Property damage: Whole building unusable

The meeting place of the Nitijela, the legislature of the Marshall Islands, was destroyed in a fire on August 26, 2025. The archives and the library of the parliament, located in the same building, were also destroyed. No human lives were lost to the fire.

== Fire ==
The fire started at the midnight on August 26. According to a cabinet spokesperson the fire started from a container located next to the parliament building. The fire spread quickly and by the time when the fire brigade arrived, the whole building was already ablaze. Half of the building was outright destroyed, and the other half was left unusable due to fire damages according to the local police.

According to the former Minister of Health Jack Niedenthal the Marshallese firefighters are ill-prepared to deal with large-scale fires. The main concern of the country's fire brigade is to protect the Marshall Islands International Airport, and it took over an hour to arrive to the site of Nitijela fire. The local police noted that despite this the firefighters were not passive at the site of the fire.

A large portion of the material in the parliamentary archive was not backed up in any way. The preliminary estimation concluded that it would take weeks to make sure what exactly was lost. Later it was discovered that among the documents lost were historical documents of the Marshallese constitutional convention and original copies of some laws drafted after the first years of independence.

The legislature was in session, meaning that a temporary meeting place was needed. Majuro International Conference Center was designated for this purpose on August 27.

== Reactions ==
President of the Marshall Islands Hilda Heine promised that the rebuilding effort would start during the year 2025. There were already plans to renovate administrative buildings in the capital, but a new parliamentary building would be prioritized. The groundbreaking of the building took place on October 8.

Reactions from abroad:

- Taiwan: Taiwan also promised to "provide necessary assistance in a timely manner". Taiwan donated $30 million for the reconstruction effort.
- USA: Amata Coleman Radewagen, the US House of Representatives delegate for American Samoa, promised to lobby the US government to provide assistance. US donation totaled $13 million. According to the Compact of Free Association the Marshall Islands already receives $2.3 billion on an annual basis.
- Pacific Islands Forum: General Secretary Baron Waqa offered his condolences and said that PIF would offer its assistance if asked.
