= Tarkong Pedro =

Palauan educator and politician

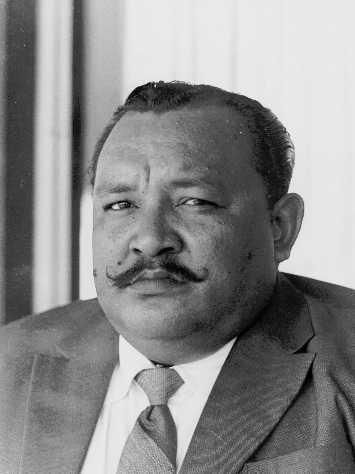

Member of the House of Representatives
- In office 1970–1974
- Preceded by: Minoru Ueki
- Succeeded by: Isidoro Rudimch
- Constituency: Palau's 10th district

Member of the Palau District Legislature
- In office –1972
- Succeeded by: Moses Mokoll
- Constituency: Koror

Personal details
- Born: Tarkong K. Pedro
- Died: 1979 (aged 47); Guam

Tarkong K. Pedro (died 1979) was a Palauan educator and politician. He served as a member of the Palau District Legislature and the House of Representatives of the Trust Territory of the Pacific Islands.

== Biography ==
In 1958 he was awarded a scholarship to study at the University of Hawaii. He subsequently became principal of Koror Elementary School, and spent a summer studying at the College of Guam.

Entering politics, he served in the Palau District Legislature as a representative of Koro until 1972. In April 1970 he defeated Jacob Sawaichi in a by-election for Palau's 10th district seat in the Trust Territory House of Representatives following the resignation of Minoru Ueki. Although he was re-elected in the November 1970 elections, the results of the Palau seats were annulled. However, he was re-elected in the subsequent by-election. He was re-elected again in 1972, but lost his seat to Isidoro Rudimch in the 1974 elections.

He died in hospital in Guam in 1979 whilst travelling to New York City for a meeting of the United Nations Trusteeship Council.
