= 1995 Marshallese referendum =

A package of constitutional reforms proposed by the Constitutional Council was held in the Marshall Islands in April 1995. In 1994 the Nitijela voted to create a Constitutional Council which would propose a raft of constitutional changes and reforms. The Council submitted thirty-five proposals, each of which had to attain a two-thirds majority of valid votes in order to pass. Turnout was low at 33%, and only a measure establishing the prevalence of the Marshallese language version of the constitution over the English one passed. All other proposals failed to reach the two-thirds bar and thus failed.
