= 1966 Trust Territory of the Pacific Islands parliamentary election =

Parliamentary elections were held in the Trust Territory of the Pacific Islands on 8 November 1966.

== Electoral system ==
The bicameral Congress consisted of a 12-member Senate with two members from each of the six districts and a 21-member House of Representatives with seats apportioned to each district based on their population – five from Truk, four from the Marshall Islands and Ponape, three from the Mariana Islands and Palau and two from Yap.

Elections were held every two years in November of even-numbered years, with all members of the House of Representatives and half the Senate (one member from each district) renewed at each election.

== Results ==
=== Senate ===
District	Elected Member	Notes
Marianas	Francis T. Palacios	
Marshalls	Amata Kabua	Re-elected
Palau	David Ramarui	
Ponape	Hirosi Ismael	
Truk	Andon Amaraich	Re-elected
Yap	Petrus Tun	
Source: TTPI

=== House of Representatives ===
District	Constituency	Elected Member	Notes
Marianas	1st District	Benjamin Manglona	Re-elected
Marianas	2nd District	Manuel D. Muna	Re-elected
Marianas	3rd District	Carlos S. Camacho	
Marshalls	4th District	Namo Hermios	Re-elected
Marshalls	5th District	Henry Samuel	Re-elected
Marshalls	6th District	Ekpap Silk	Re-elected
Marshalls	7th District	Atlan Anien	Re-elected
Palau	8th District	Lazarus Salii	Re-elected
Palau	9th District	Polycarp Basilius	
Palau	10th District	Jacob Sawaichi	Re-elected
Ponape	11th District	Joab Sigrah	
Ponape	12th District	Bethwel Henry	Re-elected
Ponape	13th District	Ambilos Iehsi	
Ponape	14th District	Daro Weital	
Truk	15th District	Raymond Setik	
Truk	16th District	Petrus Mailo	Re-elected
Truk	17th District	Soukichi Fritz	Re-elected
Truk	18th District	Mitaro Danis	Re-elected
Truk	19th District	Chutomu Nimues	Re-elected
Yap	20th District	Luke Tman	Re-elected
Yap	21st District	John N. Rugulimar	Re-elected
Source: TTPI
