= Ambilos Iehsi =

Secretary of Resources and Development
- In office 1979–1981

Member of the TTPI Senate
- In office 1969–1979
- Preceded by: Hirosi Ismael
- Constituency: Ponape

Member of the TTPI House of Representatives
- In office 1967–1968
- Preceded by: Max Iriarte
- Succeeded by: Heinrich Iriarte
- Constituency: 13th District Ponape

Personal details
- Born: 1935; Pingelap, South Seas Mandate
- Died: 14 March 1981 (aged 45); Pohnpei, Micronesia

Ambilos Iehsi (1935 – 14 March 1981) was a Micronesian politician. He served as a member of the House of Representatives and Senate of the Congress of the Trust Territory of the Pacific Islands between 1967 until 1979, and then as Secretary of Resources and Development of the Federated States of Micronesia.

== Biography ==
Born on Pingelap in 1935, Iehsi studied at the College of Guam and later also graduated from the University of Hawaii with a BA in political science in 1965. He worked as a teacher, becoming dean of students at Pacific Islands Central School, and subsequently as a political affairs officer for Ponape district.

During the first term of the TTPI Congress he was an interpreter for Max Iriarte, the member of the House of Representatives for the 13th District (Ponape). When Iriate stood down prior to the 1966 elections, Iehsi was elected in his place. Following the elections, he was elected floor leader of the House.

Although he lost his seat to Heinrich Iriarte in the 1968 elections, he successfully contested the January 1969 by-election for the vacant Ponape seat in the Senate, left empty by the resignation of Hirosi Ismael. He was re-elected to the Senate in 1970, and in January 1973 he was elected floor leader of the Senate. He was re-elected in the 1974 elections, after which he was re-elected as floor leader. In January 1977 he was elected vice president of the Senate.

Following the establishment of the Federated States of Micronesia in 1979, he became Secretary of Resources and Development under President Tosiwo Nakayama. He died in Pohnpei hospital on 14 March 1981 at the age of 45. His funeral was attended by around 5,000 people, with five days of national mourning were proclaimed from 15 to 19 March.
