= Chief Justice of the Federated States of Micronesia =

The chief justice of the Federated States of Micronesia is the seniormost judge of the Supreme Court of the Federated States of Micronesia. The position is established in article XI, section 2 of the federal Constitution.

As per article XI, section 3 of the Constitution, the chief justice is "appointed by the President with the approval of 2/3 of Congress".

He must be at least 30 years of age, and must have graduated from an accredited law school, or have practiced law at least five years and demonstrate "extraordinary legal ability".

There have been four chief justices since independence. Edward C. King served until his resignation in 1993, whereupon Andon Amaraich was appointed to the position. Chief Justice Amaraich continued to serve until his death in January 2010.

Honorable Acting Chief Justice Martin G. Yinug took his Oath of Office as the Chief Justice of the Federated States of Micronesia by H.E. President Manny Mori at the FSM Supreme Court in Palikir, Pohnpei on May 5, 2011, serving until his death on August 31, 2014.

On October 2, 2015, the Honorable Dennis K. Yamase was sworn-in as Chief Justice as the chief justice of the Federated States of Micronesia by Associate Justice Beauleen Carl-Worswick. In 2021, Beauleen Carl-Worswick began serving as the acting chief justice upon Yamase’s retirement.

== Chief Justices ==
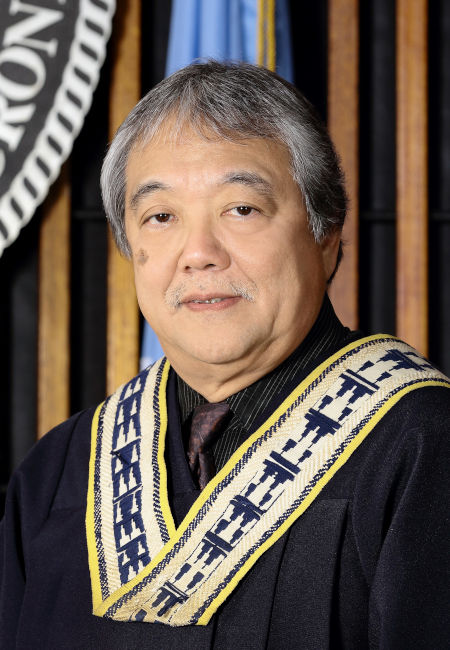
Dennis Yamase

Name	Took office	Left office	Notes
Edward C. King	March 1981	1 June 1992	
Andon Amaraich	17 December 1994	January 2010	
Martin Yinug	5 May 2011	31 August 2014	
Dennis Yamase	2 October 2015	September 2021	
Beauleen Carl-Worswick (Acting)	September 2021		
