= Etoile Island =

Island in the Marshall Islands

Coordinates: 09°49′22″N 169°13′04″E

Etoile Island is an island in the Marshall Islands. It is one of the many islands that surround the Likiep Atoll lagoon on the southern edge.
