= Secretary of Foreign Affairs (Federated States of Micronesia) =

Cabinet position in the Federated States of Micronesia

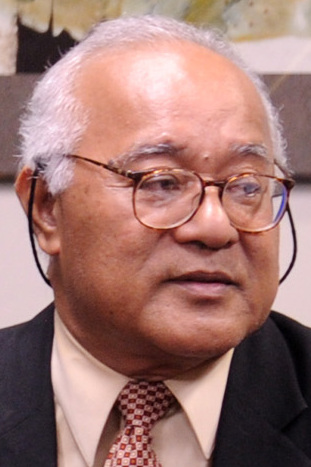
Lorin S. Robert, the longest-serving Secretary of Foreign Affairs of the Federated States of Micronesia

The secretary of foreign affairs heads the Department of Foreign Affairs in the government of the Federated States of Micronesia.

A list of officeholders follows.

- 1979–1990: Andon Amaraich
- 1990–1991: Asterio R. Takesy (acting)
- 1991–1992: Epel K. Ilon (acting)
- 1992–1996: Resio S. Moses
- 1996–1997: Asterio R. Takesy
- 1997–2000: Epel K. Ilon
- 2000–2003: Ieske K. Iehsi (acting to 2001)
- 2003............ David Panuelo (acting)
- 2003–2007: Sebastian Anefal
- 2007–2019: Lorin S. Robert
- 2019–2023: Kandhi A. Elieisar
- 2023–2025: Lorin S. Robert
