= Debrum House =

Historic house in the Marshall Islands

- U.S. National Register of Historic Places
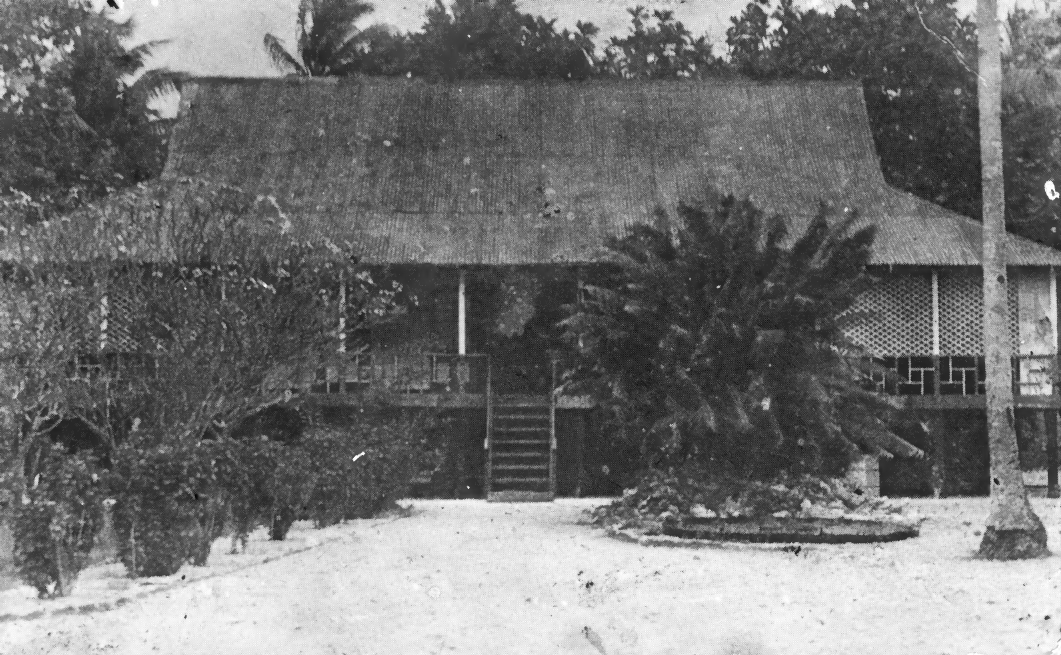

- Location within Marshall Islands
- Location: Likiep Island, Likiep Atoll, Marshall Islands
- Coordinates: 9°49′21″N 169°18′23″E
- Built: 1888
- Built by: deBrum, Joachim
- NRHP reference No.: 76002160
- Added to NRHP: September 30, 1976

The Joachim DeBrum House, known simply as the DeBrum House and also spelled Debrum House or De Brum House, located on Likiep Island, of Likiep Atoll, in the Marshall Islands, is a plantation house that was built in 1888 by Joachim DeBrum. It was listed on the United States National Register of Historic Places in 1976, making it the first NRHP site in Micronesia.

Because the climate of Palau quickly deteriorates wooden structures, the Debrum House is significant as the only tropical plantation home surviving in the Marshall Islands or in all of the Trust Territory of the Pacific Islands. It is associated with the "history of German and Japanese occupations, colonization, World War II and the early Post War Periods."

== History ==
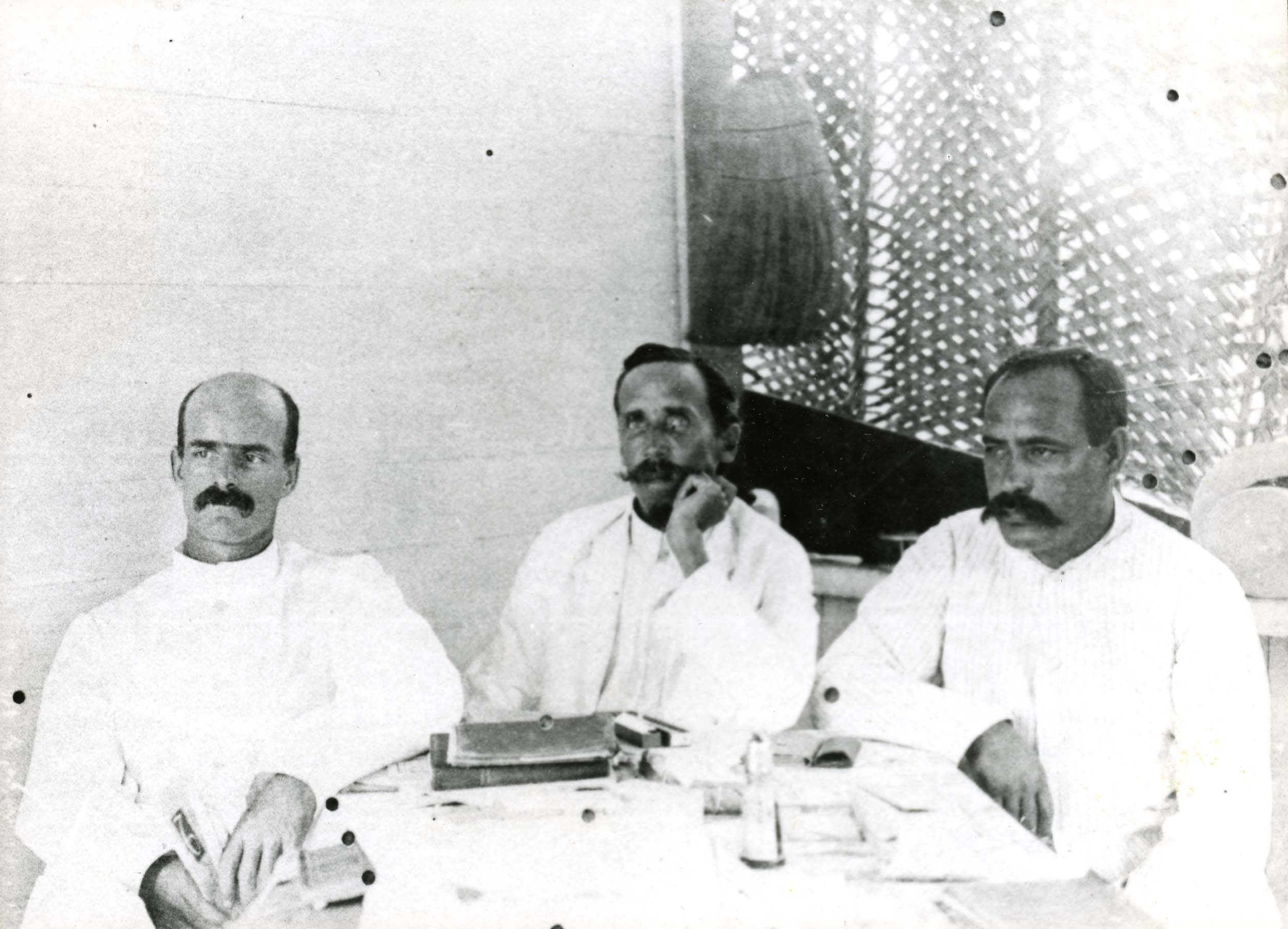
De Brum (right) with German businessman Adoph Capelle and Australian missionary Carl Heine

Joachim DeBrum was a Marshallese merchant, engineer, and scientist. He was the son of Portuguese merchant José Anton DeBrum. Together with Adolph Capelle, DeBrum purchased Likiep Atoll from his Marshallese wife's chief, Iroij Elap Jortaka, during the 1870s. Joachim finished the house by 1888. During the German colonization period, it was one of the largest houses on Likiep Atoll. He furnished the house with imports from the United States, Germany, and across Asia. It was lived in by the deBrum family until 1947, at which point it became vacant and cared for by local caretakers.

The DeBrum House was destroyed a few years ago, and all that is left is a few remnants of the foundation.

== Architecture ==
The Debrum House was finished in 1888 as a small, single-story frame building on concrete piers, with a high-pitched thatch roof. DeBrum designed the building in a mixture of German and traditional Marshallese architectural styles. It originally contained only one 19-by-19-foot central parlor and two 13-foot-by-19-foot bedrooms off this main chamber. Although it originally sat about 18 inches off the ground, at some point it was raised to a height of six feet. The original floors, external walls, and only the interior walls of the parlor were made of California redwood. The entire structure was surrounded by a covered veranda. In 1929, the original thatch roof was replaced with metal sheeting. By the 1970s, the house was quickly deteriorating and underwent major renovations in 1977 and 1984. A new metal roof and supports were installed, and the redwood floors and walls were replaced. Nearby are a storage building, a detached dining room-kitchen, several cisterns, the family graveyard, and the remains of several structures that have since collapsed.

Most of the furniture in the house was well preserved. Most furnishings were made of teak that had been imported from China. These pieces were intricately decorated and carved, sometimes including marble or ivory inlays. The house also contained over 1,000 books from DeBrum's personal library and research, and sound recordings believed to be some of the earliest taken in Micronesia.
