= Agony Island =

Island in the Marshall Islands

Coordinates: 09°49′25″N 169°14′04″E

Agony Island is an island in the Marshall Islands. It is one of the many islands that surround the Likiep Atoll lagoon on the southern edge.
