= Tokaen Island =

Island in the Marshall Islands in the Pacific Ocean

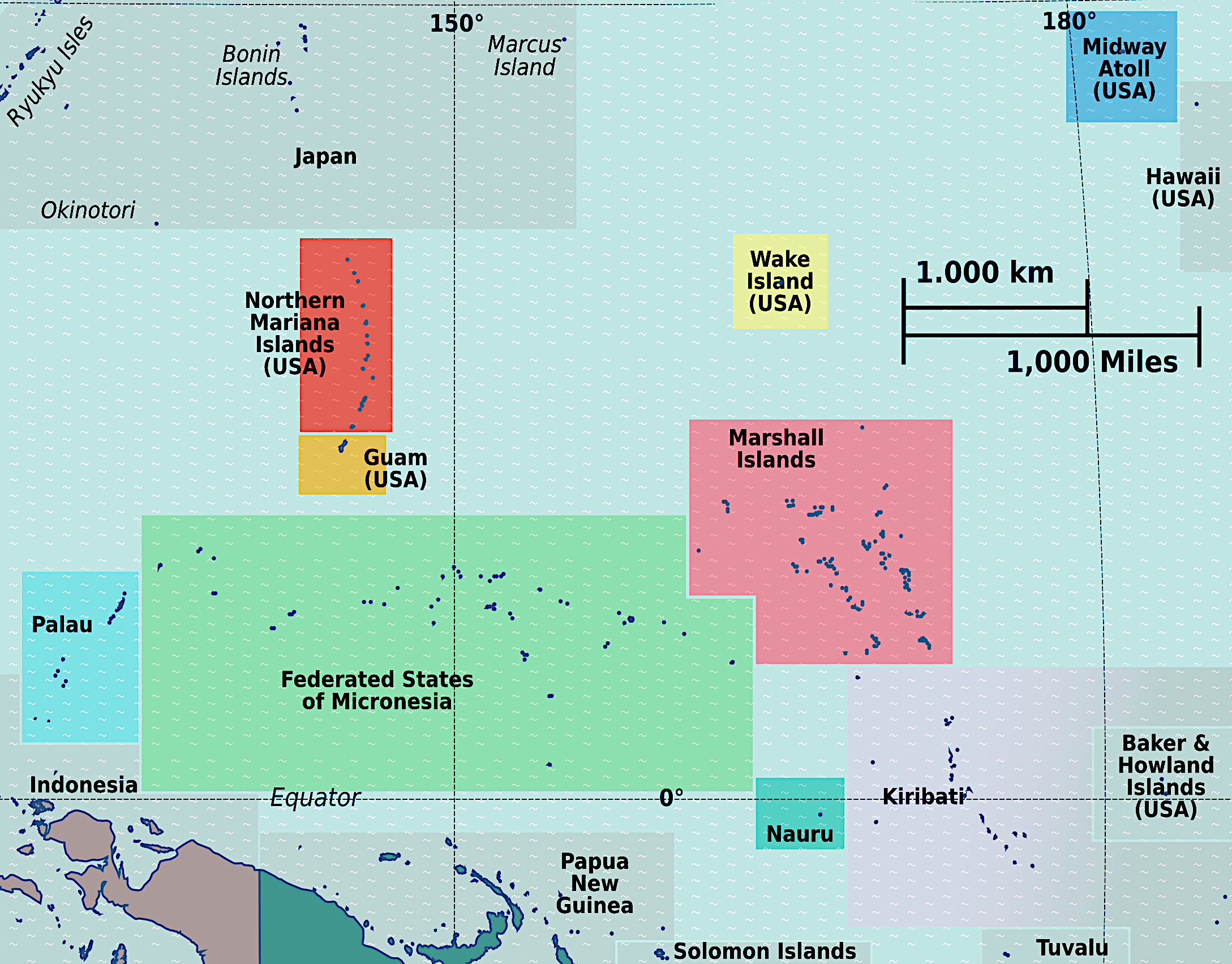
- Location within Marshall Islands Location within Micronesia
- Coordinates: 9°48′59″N 169°6′19″E

Tokaen Island (Marshallese: Tōkā-eņ, [tˠʌɡæɛːnˠ]) is an island in the Marshall Islands. It is one of the many islands that surround the Likiep Atoll lagoon on the southern edge.
