= Alvin Jacklick =

Marshallese politician (born 1949)

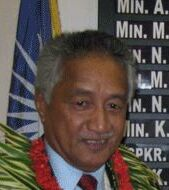
- Jacklick in 2009

Speaker of the Legislature
- In office 2010–2011
- Preceded by: Jurelang Zedkaia
- Succeeded by: Donald Capelle

Personal details
- Born: 3 August 1949 (age 77) Kwajalein Atoll
- Party: KEA

Alvin Jacklick (born 1949) is a Marshallese politician and government minister. In the late 1980s, he was elected mayor of Ebeye, at a time when he was described as a "young radical". He was involved in the projects of the Kwajalein Atoll Development Corporation. Jacklick was the Speaker of Nitijela, the Marshallese Parliament, from 2010 to 2011.

== Career ==
By 1986, he was serving as the Mayor of Kwajalein Atoll. In 1986, he refused to serve court papers to Kwajalein landowners whom had been arrested for tresspasing on the Kwajalein Missile Range. He did it in protest against Kwajalein Police Department using what he believed to be excessive force against his constituents. Jacklick was first elected to the Legislature of the Marshall Islands in 1992.

In the 2015 general election Jacklick was elected to the Legislature of the Marshall Islands for Kwajalein. In 2016, the President of the Marshall Islands, Casten Nemra, was deposed following a vote of no confidence in the Legislature of the Marshall Islands. Jacklick was named as one of the potential candidates to replace him. In January 2016, he was narrowly defeated in his bid for the Presidency of the Marshall Islands by Casten Nemra by a 17–16 vote.

He has also been involved with diplomatic relations with Taiwan. He was Foreign Minister from 2000 to 2001. In 2014, he was one of the outspoken Marshallese senators against the nomination of an ex-Lebanese general as envoy to UNESCO. Jacklick lost his Kwajalein Nitijela seat in the 2019 Marshall Islands general election, finishing fourth out of four in a race for three seats.
