= Daisy Alik-Momotaro =

Marshallese politician

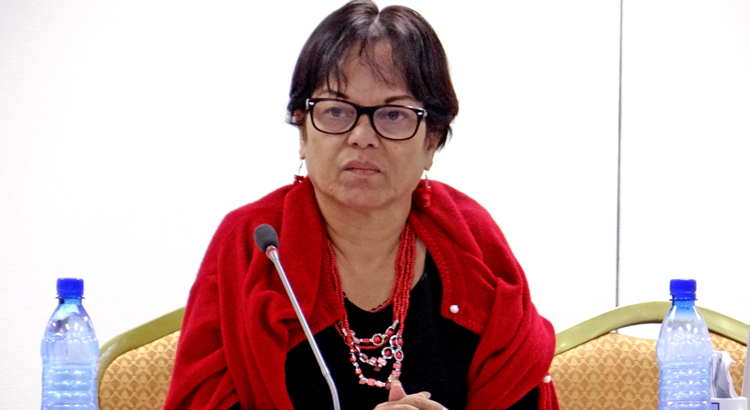
- Alik-Momotaro in 2017
- Education: Portland State University (BS); University of the South Pacific (MBA)
- Occupation: Politician

Daisy Alik-Momotaro is a Marshallese politician. She was a member of the Legislature of the Marshall Islands from 2015 to 2019, representing the Jaluit constituency.

== Career ==
Alik-Momotaro studied at Portland State University in the United States, where she received dual Bachelor of Science degrees in Gender and Communication Studies, and at the University of the South Pacific, where she received a Master of Business Administration. In 1987, she co-founded a national women's organisation, Women United Together Marshall Islands (WUTMI), and served as its executive director for 13 years. In 2012, she became Permanent Secretary for the Ministry of Culture and Internal Affairs. She was preparing to run for office in 2015 when a law passed requiring candidates in the public service to take thirteen months leave prior to the elections; while many candidates withdrew, Alik-Momotaro continued with her campaign, becoming the first female taxi driver in Majuro to cover her income during the election.

Alik-Momotaro was elected to the Legislature at the 2015 election. As a Senator, she has spoken out about issues including domestic violence, women's health, climate change and gender equality. She has also raised concerns about the plight of religious private schools in the country, claiming that they fulfil an important role but are frequently on the verge of collapse due to underfunding. In February 2016, she was appointed as the new chair of the Judiciary and Government Relations Committee. She was defeated at the 2019 Marshallese general election.
