= Anal Island =

Island of the Marshall Islands

Coordinates: 9°48′N 169°07′E

Anal Island is an island in the Marshall Islands. It is one of the many islands that surround the Likiep Atoll lagoon on the southern edge.

Variant names include Aaneru, Aaneru-To, and Anel.
