= United Church of Christ – Congregational in the Marshall Islands =

The United Church of Christ – Congregational in the Marshall Islands (UCCCMI) is a Protestant Christian church in the Marshall Islands. With approximately 40,000 members, the UCCCMI is the largest religious group in the Marshall Islands, accounting for about 55 percent of the population.

The UCCCMI has its roots in the Christian missionary activity begun in the Marshall Islands in 1857 by the American Board of Commissioners for Foreign Missions, which established Congregationalist churches across the islands. An association of atoll churches was established in about 1931 by Australian missionary Carl Heine, and revived in 1946 after being suppressed by the Japanese during World War II. In 1957, when the United Church of Christ was organized in the United States, the churches in the Marshall Islands were part of this church. The UCCCMI became autonomous of the American church in 1972 and adopted its present name.

The UCCCMI has 32 congregations in the Marshall Islands and employs 52 pastors. It also has congregations in Los Angeles, Honolulu, and Eugene, Oregon. The church operates nine elementary schools and four high schools. The church also operates the Marshalls Theological College, a training college for Christian pastors.

The UCCCMI is a member of the World Council of Churches and the World Communion of Reformed Churches and maintains missionary ties with the United Church of Christ, the Christian Church (Disciples of Christ) in the United States, and the Presbyterian Church in Taiwan.
