= Kalani Kaneko =

Marshallese politician

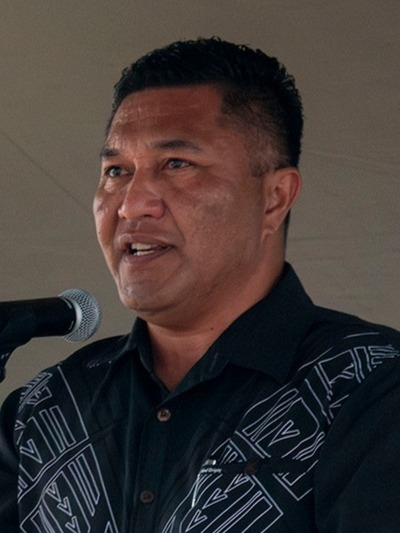
- Kaneko in 2025

Minister of Foreign Affairs and Trade of the Marshall Islands
- Incumbent
- Assumed office January 8, 2024
- Preceded by: Jack Ading

Personal details
- Born: 3 May 1975 (age 51) Mājro, Marshall Islands
- Spouse: Lorraine
- Children: Three
- Education: Post University
- Military career
- Allegiance: United States
- Branch: United States Army
- Years: 1995-2015
- Rank: First sergeant

Kalani R. Kaneko is a Marshallese politician and member of the Nitijeļā representing Mājro. A member of Kien Eo Am, as of February 2026, he is the minister of foreign affairs and trade.

== Early life ==
Kalani R. Kaneko was born in Majuro on May 3, 1975. He graduated from Moanalua High School in Honolulu, Hawaii. Kaneko is married to Lorraine Aron with whom he has three children. He entered the United States Army on December 28, 1995. He earned the highest badge in peacetime, the Expert Infantryman Badge in August 1998 at Fort Irwin National Training Center. Kaneko served as an infantryman from 1995 to 2001. He also served as a Military Police Sergeant. He was selected for recruiting duty in January 2001. In 2004, he was assigned as a station commander at Kauai Recruiting Station, Kauaʻi, Hawaii, with additional responsibility of recruiting efforts in the RMI. His final assignment was as the Portland Battalion Senior Master Trainer from 2011 to 2015. While in the Army, he earned both an associate degree in marketing and Bachelor of Science in business management from Post University.

== Political career ==
He was elected to the Nitijeļā in the 2015 election. A first time candidate, he finished fifth of thirteen candidates for one of five seats to represent Mājro. After her election to the presidency by fellow Nitijela members, President Hilda Heine appointed Kaneko the minister of health. In 2018, he was a cosponsor of a law that created SOV, the first legal tender cryptocurrency in the world. The SOV is meant to generate revenue for the Marshall Islands to develop its economy. While RMI has placed safeguards to register users, the IMF and United States have noted their concerns with the coin's potential to be used for money laundering and terrorist financing as well as the often unstable value of cryptocurrencies. Kaneko was reelected in 2019 and 2023.

He was sworn in as the Secretary of Foreign Affairs and Trade on January 8, 2024. He is the chairman of the advisory committee for the Veterans Administration for Compact veterans for a term ending in 2028. As Foreign Minister, a priority has been ensuring the receipt of veterans benefits and healthcare for Marshallese veterans of the United States Armed Forces who reside in, the Marshall Islands.
