= Eldon Note =

Marshallese politician

Senator Eldon Note

Senator for Kili Island in Nitijela

Personal details
- Party: UDP

Eldon Note is a Marshallese politician serving Kili Island in Nitijela. He was elected in the 2019 Marshallese general election with 204 votes. From 1988-1999 he served as the second speaker of the house.
