= Atlan Anien =

Politician

Atlan Anien (January 17, 1920 – 1992) was a speaker of the Legislature of the Marshall Islands.

== Biography ==
Anien began his education at the US Navy Interpreter School and subsequently went to Goshen College and then the University of Hawaii.

Anien taught elementary schools for 7 years and later was appointed Superintendent of Elementary Education in the Marshall Islands.

Anien was elected Secretary of the Marshall Islands and was a framer of the Constitution. Later, he was elected as Speaker of the Legislature in 1979 and served until 1987.

Anien was married and had 4 children.
