= Kenneth Kedi =

Marshallese politician (born 1971)

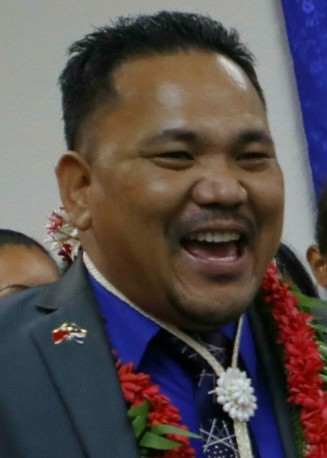
- Kedi in 2017

Speaker of the Legislature of the Marshall Islands
- In office 4 January 2016 – 3 January 2024
- Preceded by: Donald Capelle
- Succeeded by: Brenson Wase

Personal details
- Born: Kenneth A. Kedi; 1971 (age 54–55)
- Citizenship: Marshallese
- Party: Kien Eo Ad (KEA)

Kenneth A. Kedi (born 1971) is a Marshallese politician. He was Speaker of the Legislature of the Marshall Islands between 2016 and 2024, having been re-elected in 2020. Kedi is a member of the Kien Eo Ad (KEA) party.

== Life ==
Kedi was born in 1971. Kedi is a member of the Kien Eo Ad (KEA) party. He represented the Rongelap Atoll in the Legislature. He has stated that people from the atoll are hesitant to return after nuclear testing on the island by the United States during the 20th-century.

In June 2011, when Kedi was Minister of Transport and Communications, he was charged with ten counts of criminal acts relating to misappropriation of funds, making it the first time a Marshall Islands minister was charged with criminal acts. When the case went to court the next month seven of the charges were dropped, and Kedi pleaded no contest to the remaining three. The amount of money involved in the case was around US$2000. Kedi received a suspended prison sentence of 30 days, and a $1000 fine. He continued to serve as Minister.

On 4 January 2016, Kedi was elected Speaker of the Legislature of the Marshall Islands. He won the election with 19 to 14 votes of former Marshall Islands President Christopher Loeak. He succeeded Donald Capelle. In November 2018, he supported an ultimately unsuccessful vote of no-confidence in President Hilda Heine. In October 2019, the Supreme Court of the Marshall Islands struck down the country's voting law as unconstitutional relating to an issue for offshore postal ballots. Kedi subsequently argued that previous election law which did allow for offshore postal ballots to take effect again.

On 6 January 2020, Kedi was re-elected as Speaker, defeating Brenson Wase with 19 against 14 votes. While being speaker Kedi was also elected as chairman of the board of governors of the Pacific Islands Development Bank in September 2022.

In February 2023, The Washington Post reported that Kedi is under investigation by the Marshall Islands' attorney general.

Kedi lost his seat during the 2023 Marshallese general election. He was succeeded as Speaker by Wase on 3 January 2024.
