= David Kramer (Marshallese politician) =

Marshallese politician

David Kramer (born 24 February 1969) is a Marshallese politician who served as a member of the cabinet, and as a member of Nitijela

He was born in Ailinglaplap on 24 February 1969. He educated in engineering in University of Hawaiʻi and Seattle University. He was a manager in a large construction company.

He was elected as member of Nitijela in 2007. He was appointed as the Minister of Justice in the cabinet of Litokwa Tomeing in January 2008. He held the office until 2010.
