= Supreme Court of the Federated States of Micronesia =

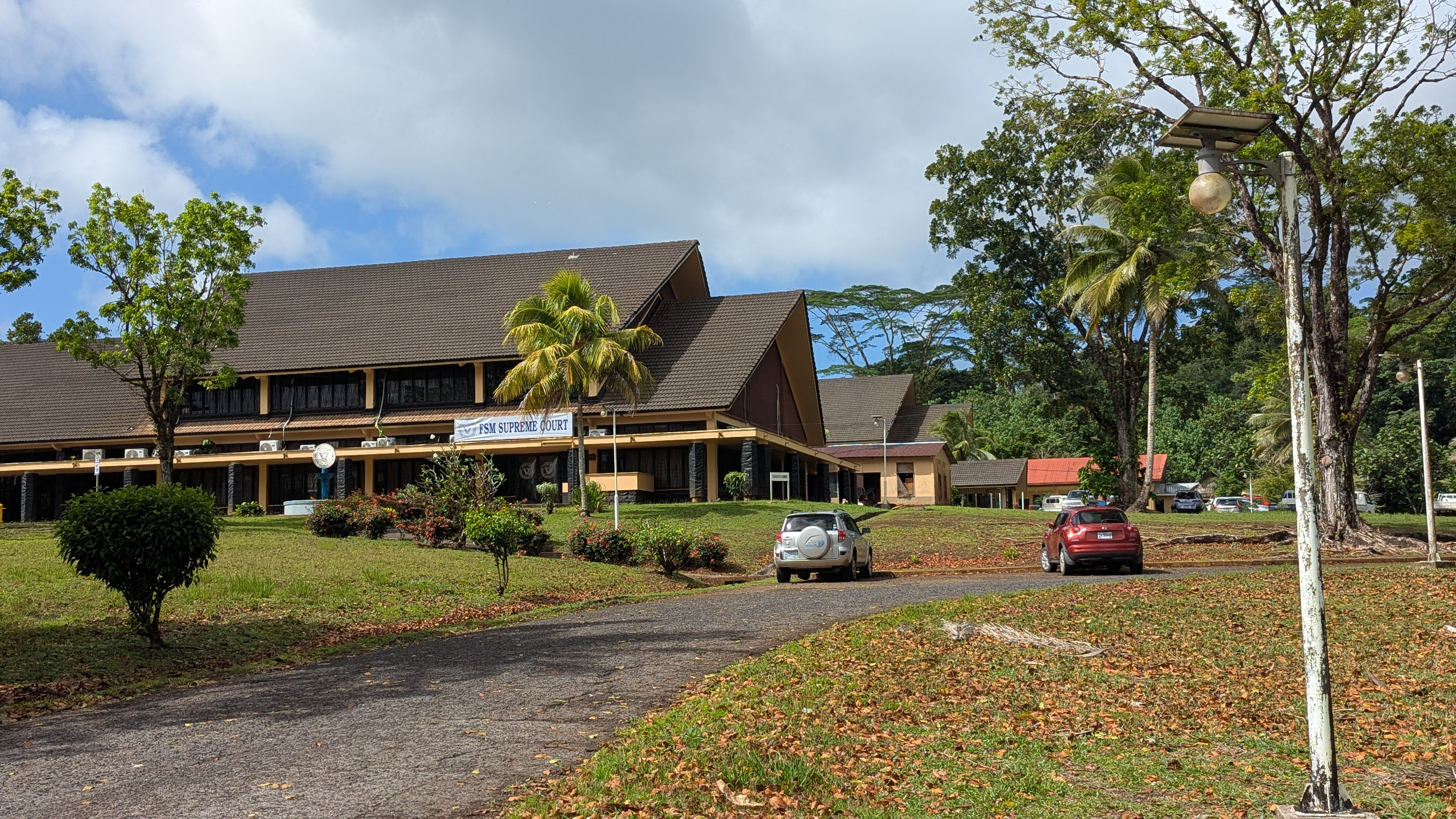
Supreme Court of the Federated States of Micronesia

The Supreme Court of the Federated States of Micronesia is the highest court in the Federated States of Micronesia. It was established by Article XI of the Constitution of the Federated States of Micronesia. It has both a trial division and an appellate division. The appellate division can hear both appeals from state courts and from the trial division: justices serve in both the trial division and the appellate division of the court, but cannot sit on an appeal of their own decision.

The court has original and exclusive jurisdiction in cases affecting officials of foreign governments, disputes between states, admiralty or maritime cases, and in cases in which the national government is a party except where an interest in land is at issue. It has a concurrent jurisdiction with the state courts in relation to cases arising under the Constitution; national law or treaties; and in disputes between a state and a citizen of another state, between citizens of different states, and between a state or a citizen thereof, and a foreign state, citizen, or subject. It has exclusive jurisdiction over allegations of violations of the National Criminal Code.

== Judges ==
The court consists of the Chief Justice of the Federated States of Micronesia and not more than five associate justices.

The court currently has three justices:

- Acting Chief Justice Beauleen Carl-Worswick
- Associate Justice Larry Wentworth
- Associate Justice Dennis L. Belcourt

Judges are appointed by the President of the Federated States of Micronesia with the approval of two thirds of the Congress of the Federated States of Micronesia.
