= Donald Capelle =

Marshallese politician

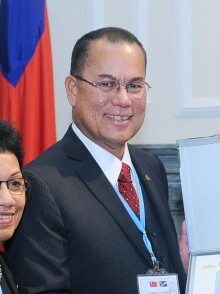
- Capelle in 2012

6th Speaker of the Legislature of the Marshall Islands
- In office January 7, 2012 – January 4, 2016
- Preceded by: Alvin Jacklick
- Succeeded by: Kenneth Kedi

Personal details
- Born: Donald F. Capelle

Donald F. Capelle is a Marshallese politician.

Capelle was Minister of Justice in 2000s. He was Speaker of the Legislature of the Marshall Islands from 2012 to 2016. In January 2020, Capelle became Minister of Transportation, Communication and Information Technology in the cabinet of President David Kabua.

On 29 November 2012, Capelle met with Taiwanese President Ma Ying-jeou.
