= Beauleen Carl-Worswick =

Micronesian judge

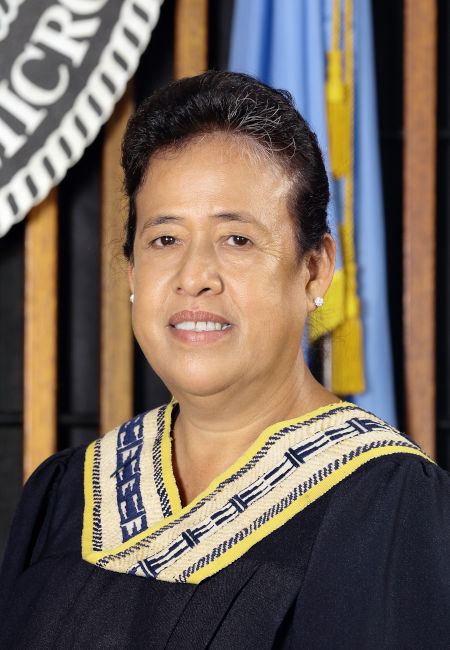
- Born: September 1962 (age 64); Pohnpei
- Education: Hawaii Loa College (BS); Gonzaga University (JD)
- Occupations: Lawyer, judge

Beauleen Carl-Worswick (born September 1962) is a Micronesian judge. She has been the acting chief justice and associate justice of the Supreme Court of the Federated States of Micronesia since September 2010. She is the first woman judge of the Supreme Court.

Carl-Worswick was born in Pohnpei, the daughter of a Pohnpei District Court judge. She graduated from Wallace Rider Farrington High School in Honolulu in 1980, received a Bachelor of Science from Hawaii Loa College in 1984 and a Juris Doctor from Gonzaga University in the United States in 1990. She returned to Micronesia to serve as a law clerk for the Supreme Court in 1990, and passed the bar examination in 1992, becoming the nation's first female Micronesian lawyer.

She was a legal specialist in the Office of the Attorney-General from May to July 1992 and an assistant attorney-general in the Yap State Attorney General's Office from August 1992 to May 1994. She then established her own law firm and worked in private practice in Yap State from September 1995 to February 1996. Carl-Worswick then worked a staff attorney for the National Public Defender's Office in Yap from 1996 to 1998 as March 1996 until December 1997.

In January 1998, Carl-Worswick returned to Pohnpei as General Counsel for the Pohnpei Utilities Corporation, holding that role until August 1999. She was then appointed and confirmed as the Chief Public Defender of the Federated States of Micronesia, serving from August 1999 to July 2007. She then worked as Court Staff Attorney for the Pohnpei Supreme Court from 2008 to 2010.

She was nominated to the Supreme Court by President Manny Mori on 15 April 2010, confirmed by the Congress of the Federated States of Micronesia on 5 August and sworn in as a Justice on 21 September. In July 2017, she granted a writ of habeas corpus to Nepalese refugees who had been detained on a boat for two years, ruling that they be released with a curfew and reporting requirements.

== See also ==
- List of first women lawyers and judges in Oceania
