= Tony Aiseia =

Marshallese politician and member of Nitijela

Honorable Tony Aiseia

Senator for Namu Atoll in Nitijela

Personal details
- Party: Independent

Tony Aiseia is a Marshallese politician serving Namu Atoll in Nitijela.
