= Andon Amaraich =

Micronesian judge

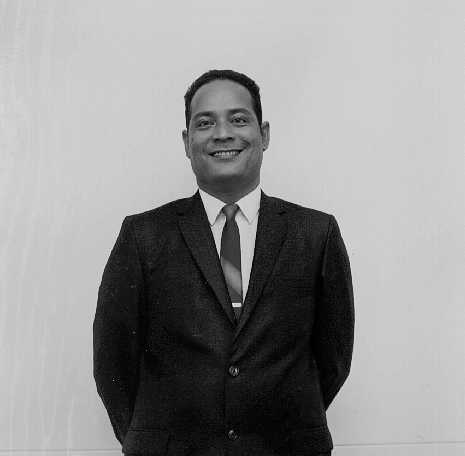
During the 1960s

Andon L. Amaraich (August 24, 1932, on the island of Ta, in what is now Chuuk State, Federated States of Micronesia – January 26, 2010, in Honolulu, Hawaii) was a Micronesian public servant, politician, diplomat and judge. He was, at the time of his death, Chief Justice of the Supreme Court. He has been described by the Micronesian government as "one of the founding fathers of the Federated States of Micronesia".

== Studies and public service ==
Having graduated from the Pacific Islands Central School, Amaraich worked briefly as a primary school teacher in Chuuk from 1951 to 1952, before entering civil service. He was Assistant Clerk to the Truk (Chuuk) District Court from 1955 to 1956, then served for ten years as Chief Public Defender. He subsequently served as Assistant District Administrator for Public Affairs in the government of the Trust Territory of the Pacific Islands, under United States colonial administration.

== Political career ==
In 1959, he entered the colonial district legislative Council, before serving in the Chuuk District Senate from 1965 to 1974. There, he served as chairman on the Committee on Judiciary and Governmental Operations, as well as being a member of the Ways and Means Committee. From 1962, he was an advisor to the United States administration in the Trusteeship Council.

From 1976 to 1987, he was chairman the Commission on the Future Political Status and Transition, before being appointed chief negotiator on the Compact of Free Association with the United States – described as "one of his greatest accomplishments".

As the country prepared for independence, in 1975, he served on the legal staff of the Micronesian Constitutional Convention, "where he personally drafted many of the provisions of the FSM Constitution".

== Diplomatic career ==
From 1979 to 1990, Amaraich was the first-ever secretary of the F.S. Micronesia's Department of External Affairs, under presidents Tosiwo Nakayama and John Haglelgam. In that function, he "played an instrumental role in developing diplomatic relationships with other nations" around the world, and "almost single-handedly organized the Department of External Affairs".

== Career as judge ==
He was appointed Associate Justice on the Supreme Court in 1990, then Chief Justice in 1993, following the resignation of Chief Justice Edward C. King. He was only the second Chief Justice in the country's history, and the first Micronesian citizen to hold that post – King being an American.

As Chief Justice, Amaraich was "an active member" of the Pacific Judicial Council, and also served as Vice Chairman of the Pacific Judicial Development Program Executive Board.

== Death ==
Suffering from "pneumonia and other complications", Amaraich travelled to Honolulu on January 15 2010 for "medical tests and treatment". He died eleven days later in Straub Clinic & Hospital.

He received a state funeral.
