= Likiep Atoll =

Coral atoll in the Pacific Ocean

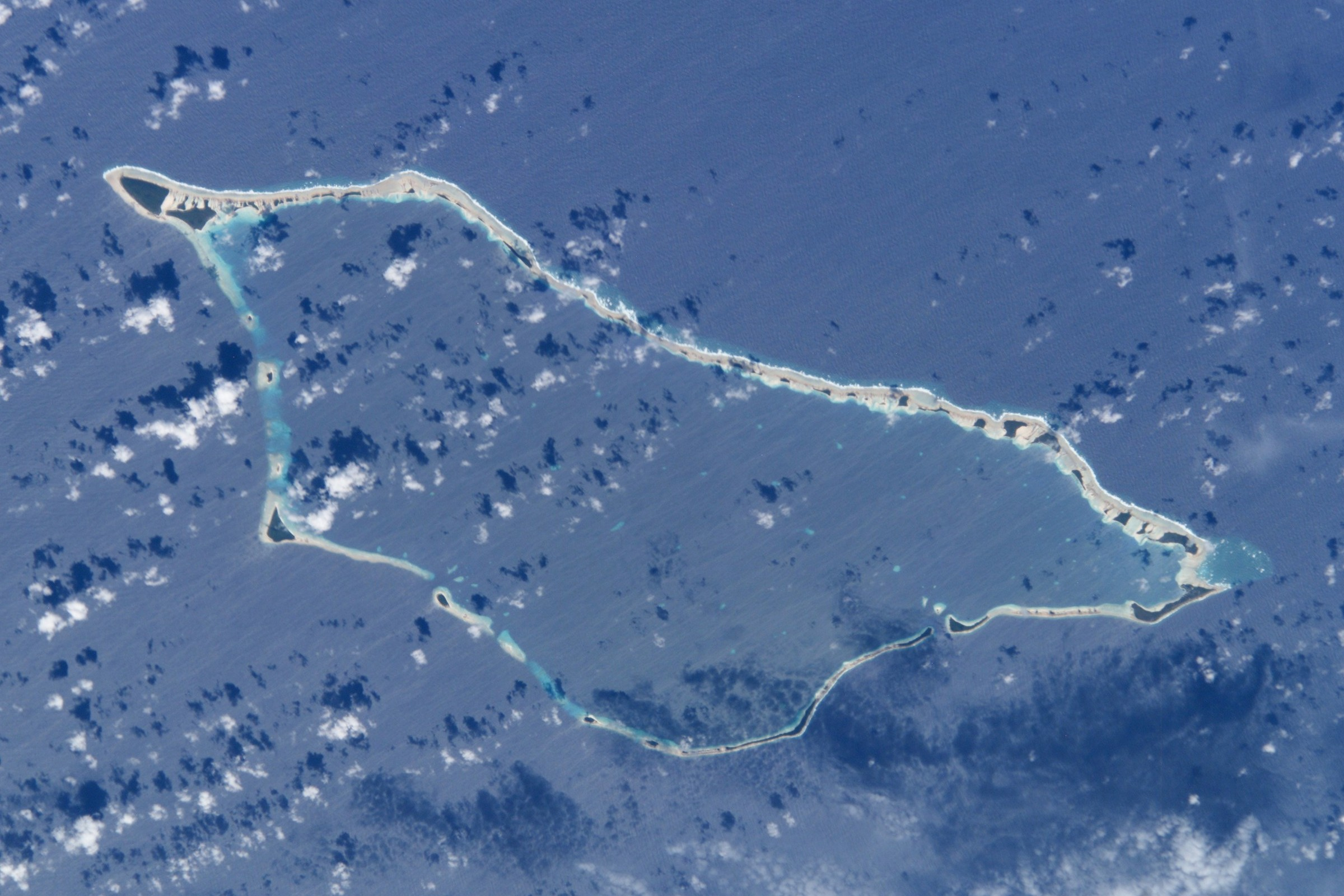
- NASA picture of Likiep Atoll

- Map of the atoll

- Location within Marshall Islands

Geography
- Location: North Pacific
- Coordinates: 09°54′00″N 169°08′00″E
- Archipelago: Ratak
- Total islands: 65
- Area: 10.26 km^{2} (3.96 sq mi)
- Highest elevation: 10 m (30 ft)

Administration
- Marshall Islands

Demographics
- Population: 228 (2021)
- Ethnic groups: Marshallese

Likiep Atoll (Marshallese: Likiep, [lʲiɡiɛpʲ]) is a coral atoll of 65 islands in the Pacific Ocean, and forms a legislative district of the Ratak Chain of the Marshall Islands. It is approximately 55 kilometers (34 mi) northwest of Wotje. Its total land area is only 10.26 square kilometers (3.96 sq mi), but that encloses a deep central lagoon of 424 square kilometers (164 sq mi). Likiep Atoll also possesses the Marshall Islands' highest point, an unnamed knoll 10 meters (33 ft) above sea level. The population of Likiep Atoll was 228 in 2021.

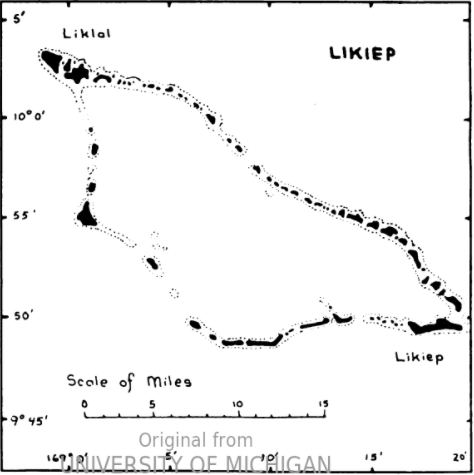
Map of the atoll

== History ==
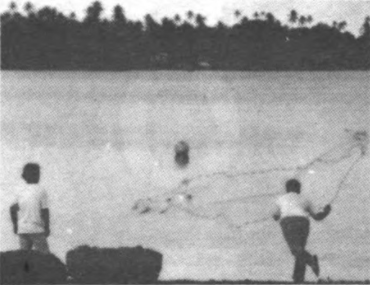
A lagoon on the atoll

The first recorded sighting by Europeans was by the Spanish expedition of Ruy López de Villalobos in January 1543. On 5 January 1565, its sighting was again recorded by the patache San Lucas, commanded by Alonso de Arellano, part of the Spanish expedition of Miguel López de Legazpi, which had by then separated from Legazpi's fleet. On 12 January 1565, it was Legazpi who arrived to Likiep Atoll and charted them as Los Corrales ("farmyards" in Spanish).

In 1877, Likiep Atoll was purchased by Anton deBrum, a Portuguese trader and whaler, from the local chief Iroij Elap Jortaka in exchange for goods. The following year it was put under the control of the trading firm Capelle & Co, in which he and the German trader Georg Eduard Adolph Capelle were partners. The company traded extensively in copra and marine products throughout Micronesia, and the atoll was developed into a colonial village-style copra plantation. Thousands of coconut trees were planted and laborers were drawn in from the surrounding islands. The atoll also developed a boat-building industry, selling ships across Micronesia. Likiep Atoll was claimed by the German Empire along with the rest of the Marshall Islands in 1885.

After World War I, the atoll came under the South Seas Mandate of the Empire of Japan. The base became part of the vast US Naval Base Marshall Islands. Following the end of World War II, it came under the control of the United States, as part of the Trust Territory of the Pacific Islands, until the independence of the Marshall Islands in 1986.

There are some historical remnants of the colonial villages and planting, including the Catholic church, the German Plantation Haus, the Japanese community center, the Spanish wharf and the Spanish cistern. Debrum House, the deBrum Pacific-trader house (1890) on Likiep Island, is listed on the U.S. National Register of Historic Places.

== Key islands ==
Key islands making up Likiep Atoll include:

- Agony Island
- Anal Island
- Etoile Island
- Tokaen Island

== Education ==
Marshall Islands Public School System operates public schools:

- Jebal Elementary School
- Likieb Elementary School
- Melang Elementary School

Northern Islands High School on Wotje serves the community.
