= John Mangefel =

Micronesian politician

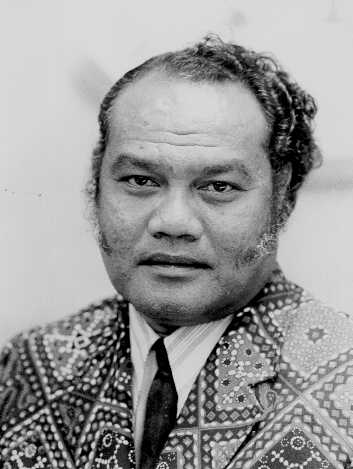
- Mangefel c. 1970

1st Governor of Yap
- In office January 8, 1979 – January 12, 1987
- Lieutenant: Hilary Tacheliol
- Preceded by: Office established
- Succeeded by: Petrus Tun

John de Avila Mangefel (May 10, 1932 – April 11, 2007) was a Micronesian politician who played an important role during the first days of Micronesian independence and in the Trust Territory period that preceded them.

Mangefel was the first college graduate from Yap, with a major in English literature from the University of Hawaii. He was elected to the Senate of Micronesian Congress from the Yap district. He served as first Governor of Yap from January 8, 1979, to January 12, 1987. In addition he was a senator during the Trust Territory period, served as the Micronesian National Planner, Deputy Secretary of Foreign Affairs, and as the Disaster Coordinator.
