= Ataji Balos =

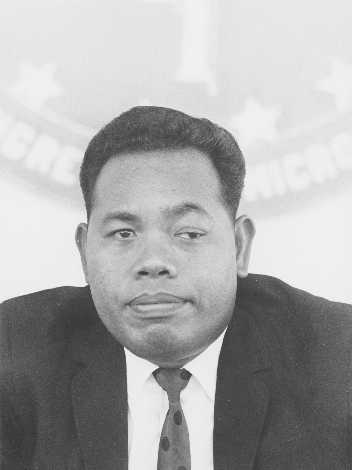
Ataji Balos in 1970

Ataji Balos is a Marshallese politician who was a member of the Congress of the Trust Territory of the Pacific Islands. During the Trust Territory era, his activism concerning Marshall Islands–United States relations included a sit-in that delayed testing of U.S. military technology as well as advocacy for the people affected by United States nuclear testing in the Marshall Islands.

He attended the University of Guam and worked as a teacher early in his career.
