= Nitijela =

National legislature

Nitijela Nitijeļā
- 46th Constitutional Regular Session

Type
- Type: Unicameral

History
- Founded: 1979

Leadership
- Speaker: Brenson Wase since 3 January 2024
- Vice Speaker: Issac Zacharias since 3 January 2024

Structure
- Seats: 33 members
- Political groups: Independent (33)
- Length of term: 4 years

Elections
- Voting system: Single and multi-seat constituencies
- Last election: 20 November 2023
- Next election: 15 November 2027

Meeting place
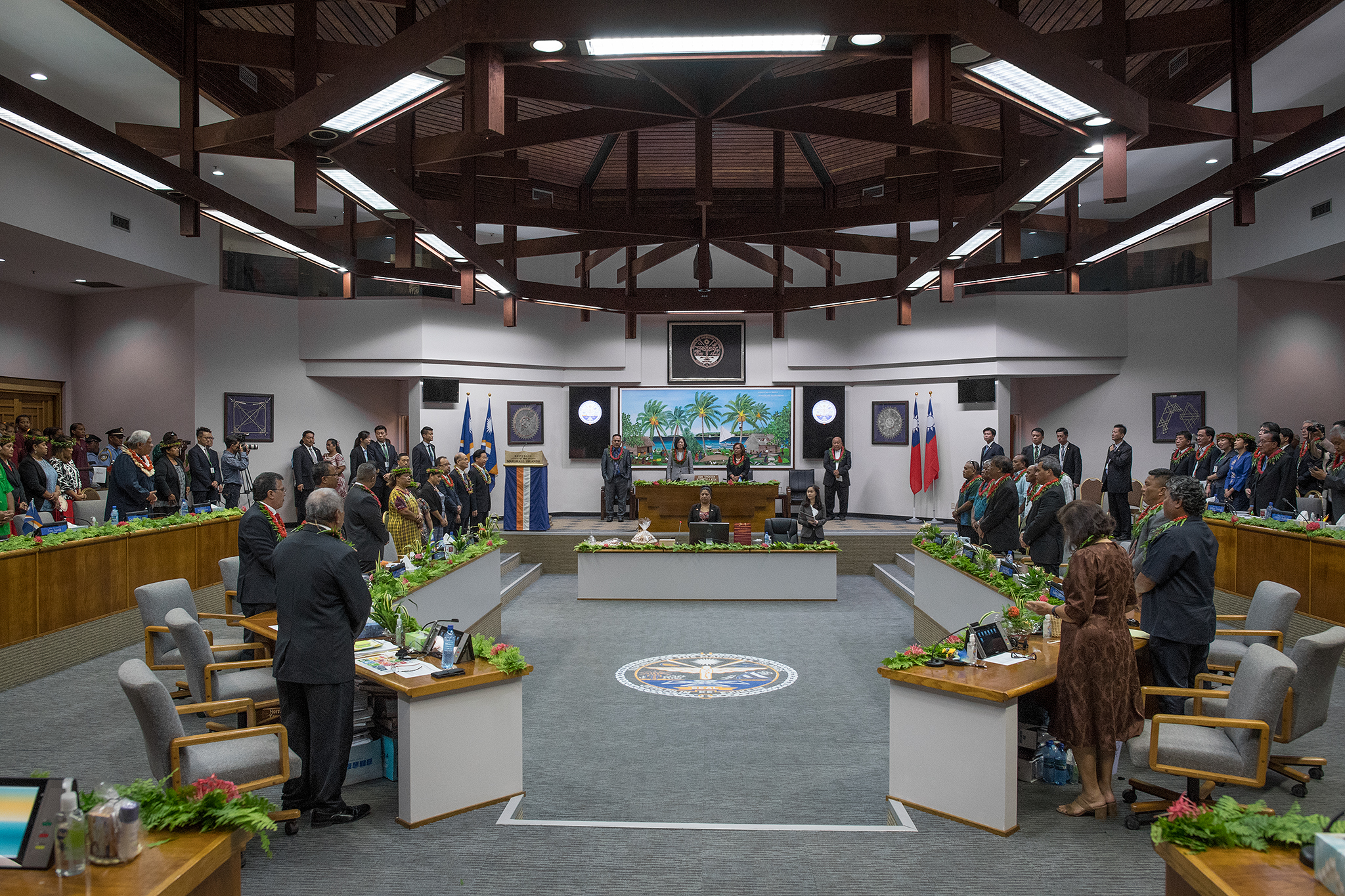
- Nitijeļā, Marshall Islands Parliament, Majuro

Website
- rmiparliament.org/cms/

The Nitijela (Marshallese: Nitijeļā [nʲidˠiːzʲɛlˠæ]) is the legislature of the Marshall Islands. It has 33 members, elected for a four-year term in nineteen single-seat and five multi-seat constituencies. The last election was 20 November 2023. Elections in the Marshall Islands are officially nonpartisan, but most members of the Nitijeļā are affiliated with one of the four active political parties in the Marshall Islands: Aelon Kein Ad (AKA), Kien Eo Am (KEA), United People's Party (UPP), and United Democratic Party (UDP).

== History ==
A bicameral Marshall Islands Congress was established in July 1950. The two chambers were the House of Iroij and the House of Assembly. Kabua Kabua was the president of the House of Iroij in 1953. Atlan Anien was the president of the House of Assembly in 1953.

The Congress was reformulated as unicameral in 1958. Members were elected for a 4-year term. The congress was chaired by Atlan Anien in 1959, Amata Kabua in 1962, and Dwight Heine in 1963 and 1964.

The legislature, Nitijeļā, was established in its current form in 1979 by the Constitution of the Marshall Islands.

=== 2025 parliament building fire ===
On 26 August 2025, the parliament building, library and archives were destroyed in a fire. Half of the building was burned down, while the other half remains in an unusable state. Both the US and Taiwan offered financial assistance for the reconstruction that started October 8.

== Speakers ==
The salary of the speaker is set to US$35,000 annually.

Name	Period	Notes
Atlan Anien	1979–1988	
Kessai Note	1988–1999	
Litokwa Tomeing	January 10, 2000 – 2007	
Jurelang Zedkaia	January 7, 2008 – October 26, 2009	
Alvin Jacklick	November 2, 2009 – January 7, 2012	
Donald Capelle	January 7, 2012 – January 4, 2016	
Kenneth Kedi	January 4, 2016 – January 3, 2024	
Brenson Wase	January 3, 2024 – Incumbent	

== Members of Nitijeļā ==
The twenty-four electoral districts into which the country is divided correspond to the inhabited islands and atolls. There are four political parties in the Marshall Islands: Aelon Kein Ad (AKA), Kien Eo Am (KEA), United People's Party (UPP), and United Democratic Party (UDP). Control is shared by the AKA and the KEA.

Members of the Nitijeļā as of 2020
Constituency	Member	Title	Party
Ailinglaplap Atoll	Alfred Alfred Jr.	Minister of Resources and Development	KEA
Ailinglaplap Atoll	Christopher Loeak	Senator, former president (2012–2015)	AKA
Ailuk Atoll	Maynard Alfred	Senator	KEA
Arno Atoll	Jejwarick Anton	Vice Speaker	KEA
Arno Atoll	Mike Halferty	Minister of Transportation and Communication	Ind.
Aur Atoll	Hilda Heine	Senator, former president (2016–2020)	Ind.
Ebon Atoll	John Silk	Minister of Foreign Affairs	KEA
Enewetak Atoll	Jack Ading	Senator	AKA
Jabat Island	Kessai Note	Senator, former president (2000–2007)	UDP
Jaluit Atoll	Daisy Alik-Momotaro	Senator	Ind.
Jaluit Atoll	Casten Nemra	Senator, former president (2016)	Ind.
Kili Island	Eldon Note	Senator	UDP
Kwajalein Atoll	Alvin Jacklick	Senator	KEA
Kwajalein Atoll	Michael Kabua	Senator	AKA
Kwajalein Atoll	David Paul	Minister in Assistance to the President	KEA
Lae Atoll	Thomas Heine	Minister of Justice	AKA
Lib Island	Joe Bejang	Senator	AKA
Likiep Atoll	Leander Leander Jr.	Senator	AKA
Majuro Atoll	Kalani Kaneko	Minister of Health	KEA
Majuro Atoll	David Kramer	Senator	KEA
Majuro Atoll	Tony Muller	Minister of Public Works	KEA
Majuro Atoll	Sherwood Tibon	Senator	KEA
Majuro Atoll	Brenson Wase	Minister of Finance	KEA
Maloelap Atoll	Bruce Bilimon	Senator	AKA
Mejit Island	Dennis Momotaro	Senator	UPP
Mili Atoll	Wilbur Heine	Minister of Education	AKA
Namdrik Atoll	Wisely Zackhras	Senator	UDP
Namu Atoll	Tony Aiseia	Senator	AKA
Rongelap Atoll	Kenneth Kedi	Speaker	KEA
Ujae Atoll	Atbi Riklon	Senator	AKA
Utirik Atoll	Amenta Matthew	Minister of Internal Affairs	KEA
Wotho Atoll	David Kabua	President	AKA
Wotje Atoll	Litokwa Tomeing	Senator, former President	UPP

== Committees ==
The Nitijeļā has 7 permanent standing committees with oversight authority and legislative authority. All committees have 9 members.

Nitijeļā Permanent Standing Committees
Committee	Chair	Duties
Appropriation	Casten Nemra	considers and reports on all legislation relating to public expenditure or financial administration, both federal and local, including budget estimates and supplementary estimates referred to it
Public Accounts	Bruce Bilimon	considers the public funds and account of the Marshall Islands, in conjunction with the report of the Auditor-General on them; reports to the Nitijeļā any excess/unauthorized expenditures and the reasoning for it; proposes any legislation it deems necessary to ensure public funds are properly and efficiently spent and accounted for; reports to the Nitijeļā on any audit of public accounts
Health, Education, and Social Affairs	Alvin Jacklick	considers all legislation relating to the education, health, condition of labor, and well-being of the people of the Marshall Islands
Ways and Means	Sherwood Tibon	considers all legislation relating to the revenue of the federal and local governments, including matters relating to the administration of revenue laws
Judiciary and Governmental Relations	Daisy Alik-Momotaro	
Resources and Development	David Kramer	
Foreign Affairs and Trade	Maynard Alfred	

== Staff ==
The Nitijeļā is supported by various staff.

=== Clerk of the Nitijeļā ===
The clerk is the administrative head of the legislature, with authority to approve related matters. The clerk prepares the Nitijeļā's business and serves as the legislature's secretary, keeping minutes and publishing them.

The current clerk is Morean Watak, and Carl Alik is her assistant clerk.

=== Legislative Counsel ===
The Office of the Legislative Counsel was established in 1981. The office provides legal advice to MPs and the speaker, as well as providing legislative drafting services. The legislative counsel also serves as the Commissioner of the Marshall Islands Revised Code if the Cabinet has not appointed a commissioner.

The current legislative counsel is Joe Lomae.

== See also ==
- Government of the Marshall Islands
- Politics of the Marshall Islands
- Elections in the Marshall Islands
- Congress of the Trust Territory of the Pacific Islands
- List of legislatures by country
