= Bethwel Henry =

Micronesian politician (1934–2020)

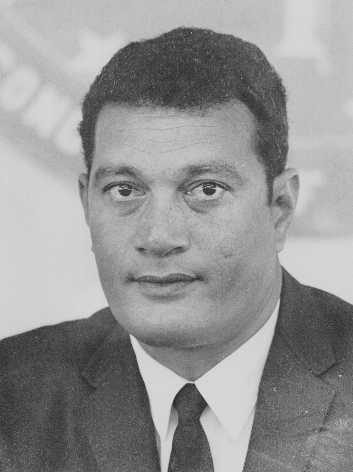
- Henry c. 1970

Speaker of the Congress of the Federated States of Micronesia
- In office May 10, 1979 – May 11, 1987
- Preceded by: Office established
- Succeeded by: Jack Fritz

Member of the Congress of the Federated States of Micronesia
- In office May 10, 1979 – May 11, 1987
- Preceded by: Office established
- Succeeded by: Leo Falcam

Speaker of the House of Representatives of the Trust Territory of the Pacific Islands
- In office 1966 – May 10, 1979
- Preceded by: Dwight Heine
- Succeeded by: Office abolished

Member of the House of Representatives of the Trust Territory of the Pacific Islands
- In office 1964 – May 10, 1979
- Preceded by: Office established
- Succeeded by: Office abolished

Speaker of the Pohnpei District Legislature
- In office 1959–?
- Preceded by: Office established

Deputy Speaker of the Pohnpei District Legislature
- In office ?–?

Member of the Pohnpei District Legislature
- In office 1959–1969
- Preceded by: Office established

Postmaster General of the Federated States of Micronesia
- In office 1988–2007

Personal details
- Born: March 3, 1934 Mokil Atoll, Ponape Region, South Seas Mandate
- Died: December 16, 2020 (aged 86)
- Education: University of Hawaiʻi

Bethwel Henry (March 3, 1934 – December 16, 2020) was a Micronesian politician. He was a leading figure in establishing the Federated States of Micronesia and served as the nation's first Speaker of the Congress.

Born on Mokil Atoll, Henry graduated from the University of Hawaiʻi in 1959 with a Bachelor of Arts degree in political science and was the first Micronesian to receive a degree in his field. Soon after, he was elected to his district's legislature, being named its first speaker. He was elected unopposed to the Congress of the Trust Territory of the Pacific Islands in 1964 and was chosen Speaker of the House in 1966.

An advocate for Micronesian independence, Henry negotiated with the American government and helped the territory achieve independence in 1979. He then became a member of the new nation's Congress and was elected Speaker, a position he served in until 1987. He later served as the Micronesian Postmaster General.

== Early life and education ==
Henry was born on March 3, 1934, on Mokil Atoll, part of Pohnpei State, then a territory of Japan as part of the South Seas Mandate and present-day Federated States of Micronesia (FSM). The son of Frank Henry, a carpenter, he attended elementary school in Mokil starting at age seven. However, after a year, his family moved to Pohnpei when his father was recruited for the Japanese government. He remained on the island as World War II commenced, returning to Mokil after the war in 1946. Henry returned to the Mokil elementary school and learned the alphabets of English and Pohnpeian.

Henry returned to Pohnpei in 1947 when his father went back to work there, enrolling at the Ponape Teacher Training School where he was taught by officers of the United States Navy. He recalled that "The teachers spoke this strange language, English, which I thought I would never be able to speak." In 1948, he enrolled at the newly-opened Ponape Intermediate School, being among the first students.

Henry was considered an "exceptional student, holding student body positions demanding integrity and judgement." In 1951, he was noticed by Robert Halvorsen, the educational administrator for the Caroline Islands, who became "so impressed" by Henry that he offered to send him to school in Hawaii at his own expense. Through the efforts of Halvorsen, Henry was able to attend the Mid-Pacific Institute in Honolulu, beginning in September 1951 when he was age 17. He attended the school for two years before returning to Pohnpei, becoming a translator in the Trust Territory District Administrator's office.

Henry also worked as a teacher in Mokil for two months. He then returned to Hawaii and began attending Lahainaluna Technical High School on Maui. After graduating from high school, he attended the University of Hawaiʻi from 1955 to 1959, except for the summer of 1957 when he worked as a translator for the government of Pohnpei. Henry attended the university on a scholarship from the John Hay Whitney Foundation of New York City, being among only 51 recipients of the grant in the U.S. At Hawaii, he was prominent in several local organizations and university clubs, including being president of the local YMCA, vice president of the International Students Association, and president of the Micronesia Club.

In June 1959, Henry graduated from the university with a Bachelor of Arts degree in political science. He became the first Micronesian in history to receive a degree in the field. Later that year, he became a teacher at the Pacific Islands Central School in Pohnpei, where he was one of only two Micronesian teachers. He remained a teacher at the school until 1969.

== Political career ==
=== Early career ===
After his experiences at the University of Hawaiʻi, which included confronting racism, Henry became active in politics and an advocate for Micronesian independence. The same month Henry graduated from college, the 25-year-old was selected as a Micronesian delegate and advisor for the United Nations Trusteeship Council on June 29, 1959. He was only the third Micronesian to hold such a position. Also that year, the Pohnpei Congress was reformed into the Pohnpei District Legislature and Henry was elected to the legislature. After being elected, he was chosen as the presiding officer of the congress, thus becoming its first speaker. He later became the deputy speaker of the district legislature and also served in the position of Chairman of the Political Committee. He remained in the Pohnpei District Legislature until 1969. Additionally, in the fall of 1959 Henry served as one of two Pohnpei representatives at the annual Interdistrict Consultative Conference to the High Commissioner, where he discussed with representatives from six other districts recommendations for "the economic, social and political advancement of the islands and their inhabitants."

=== Congress of the Trust Territory of the Pacific Islands ===
In 1964, Henry was elected unopposed to the newly-established Congress of the Trust Territory of the Pacific Islands as a member of the House of Assembly (later House of Representatives), being a representative of Mokil and several other islands. He was elected the floor leader in his first year in the congress, serving as the first legislative secretary of the House of Assembly and helping to create the legislative rules. In the second session of congress, in 1966, he was elected the Speaker of the House, succeeding Dwight Heine of the Marshall Islands. In this role, he presided over the house, appointing members of various committees and working with the President of the Senate to "coordinate activities of the Congress as a whole."

Henry was an official representative of the Trust Territory Government at the independence ceremony for the Republic of Nauru in 1969. Also that year, he led a delegation with Amata Kabua that met with U.S. president Richard Nixon in Guam, expressing the desire of Micronesians to be able to decide their future. Upon returning, he helped develop the creation of a delegation to confer with the Americans on the political future of the Trust Territory.

Henry was re-elected continually to the Trust Territory Congress and as Speaker, only being opposed once for re-election to the Congress in 1970, being known for his "respectful and humble leadership style." In 1974, he was interviewed by the Micronesian Reporter and described his favorite accomplishments of Congress as the Political Status Committee, which educated Micronesians on the options for future political status, and bills including the Constitutional Convention bill, Social Security measure, Merit System and Income Tax Law, as well as health projects and appropriations measures.

Henry maintained close ties with Tosiwo Nakayama, President of the Senate during the time that Henry was Speaker of the House. Ieske Iehsi, a civil servant who worked with both, described "The close bond between them as leaders and friends ... was quite remarkable. I have never seen such an effective relationship of mutual understanding, support and commitment to progress between heads of branches of government anywhere." They worked together with Andon Amaraich in negotiating with the American government about the potential independence of Micronesia. The Federated States of Micronesia became an independent nation in 1979, and Henry is considered one of the nation's Founding Fathers.

=== Congress of the Federated States of Micronesia ===
Henry had served as the Speaker of the House of the Trust Territory Congress until its dissolution in May 1979, when Micronesia became independent. He served as a member of the Transitional Congress that was active from March to May 1979, helping to form the constitutional government and the Congress of the Federated States of Micronesia. He was elected to the Congress and became its first speaker; Tosiwo Nakayama became the first president of the Federated States of Micronesia.

The Marshall Islands Journal noted that "Nakayama and Henry kept the Micronesian government in step for decades as the leaders focused on establishing the Federated States of Micronesia. The unusual closeness of Nakayama and Henry, coupled with Henry's respectful and humble leadership style, gave the FSM a cohesive leadership team for decades during its formative years." Ieske Iehsi noted that the two "were true Micronesian statesmen who held a strong view of supporting comprehensive national interests over the competing parochial political interests that normally derail national unity and progress. They were both humble and bright, patient, highly respected and charismatic leaders who kept FSM together." Henry remained a senator for Micronesia and its Speaker of the Congress until being defeated in his re-election bid in March 1987, by Leo Falcam.

== Later life and death ==
After being defeated by Falcam, Henry became the Postmaster General for Micronesia in 1988. Through his efforts, he was able to get FSM citizens the same rights and postal rates as United States citizens. He remained the Postmaster General through 2007. President David Panuelo said that the nation's Postal Service became "reliable" due to Henry's "steady leadership": "In fact, of the bottomless list of accomplishments one can attribute to Bethwel Henry, one that has had a real-life effect on every FSM citizen was his assistance in ensuring FSM postal rates are the same as US domestic destinations." Henry also had various positions in local organizations, including being the vice chairman of the Kolonia Development Authority. He was active in his church and was the president of the Pohnpei State Christian Endeavor Society.

Henry died on December 16, 2020, at the age of 86. President Panuelo released a statement noting that "His decades of dedication to the Congress of Micronesia under the Trust Territory of the Pacific Islands, to the FSM Congress as its first Speaker, and to the FSM Postal Services, allowed for our nation to emerge from a dream to a reality, and for our young government to enjoy continuity." An official period of mourning was declared and Henry received a state funeral. In 2023, a vessel bearing his name, the FSS Bethwel Henry, was given to the FSM by the Australian government.
