= Districts of the Trust Territory of the Pacific Islands =

The districts of the Trust Territory of the Pacific Islands were the primary subdivisions of the Trust Territory of the Pacific Islands.

== History ==
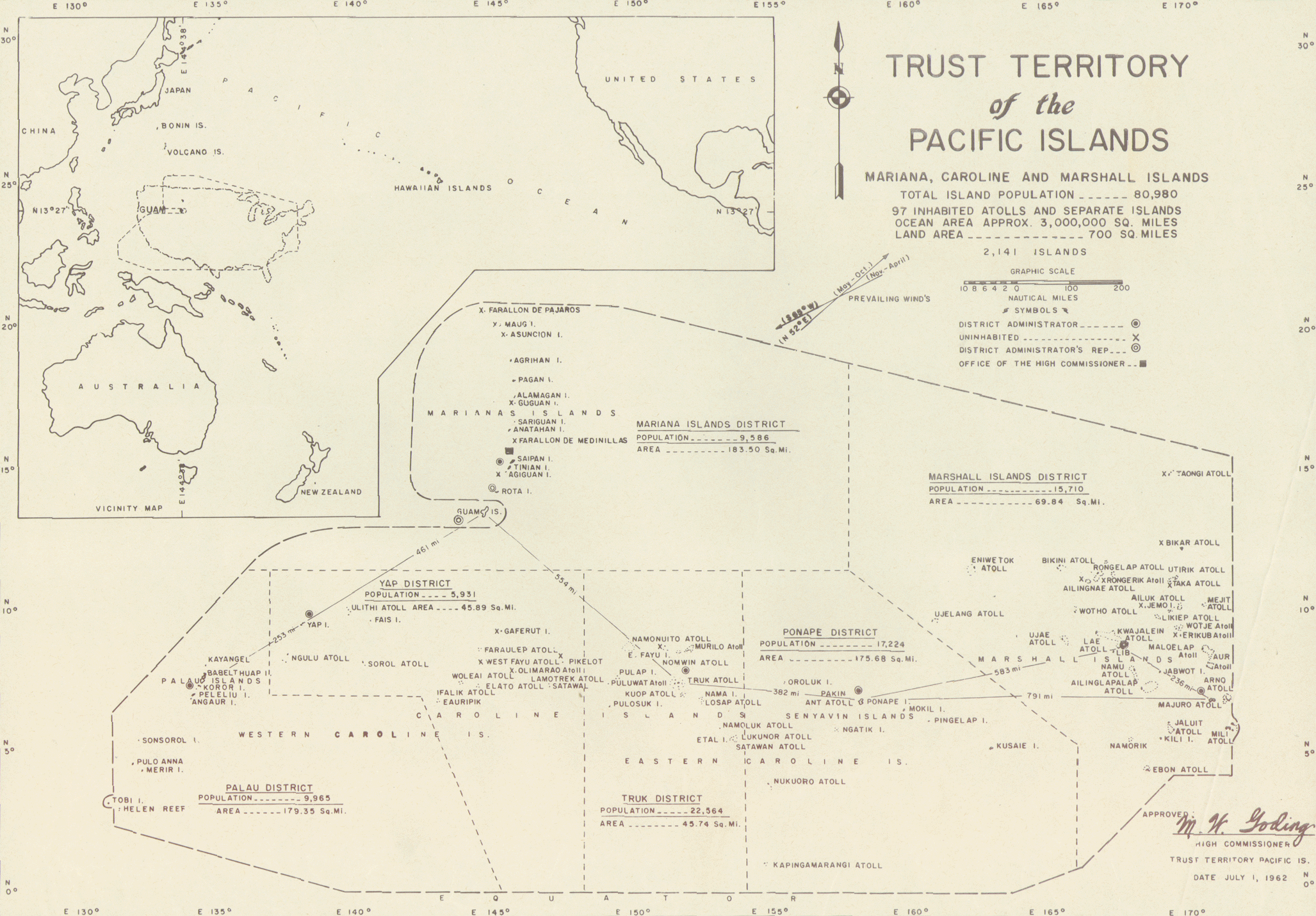

In 1962 there existed six districts with the following population:

- Chuuk District – 22564
- Mariana Islands District – 9586
- Marshall Islands District – 15710
- Palau District – 9965
- Pohnpei District – 17224
- Yap District – 5931

"In a 1975 plebiscite the Northern Marianas group voted to become a commonwealth of the United States and, from 1976, was administered separately from the rest of the territory. The remaining island groups were reorganized again into six districts...", the Kosrae District was created out of the Pohnpei District, keeping six districts.
