= Congress of the Trust Territory of the Pacific Islands =

Legislative body

Type
- Type: Bicameral

History
- Founded: 1964
- Disbanded: 1979

Structure
- Length of term: 4 years (Senators); 2 years (Representatives)

Meeting place
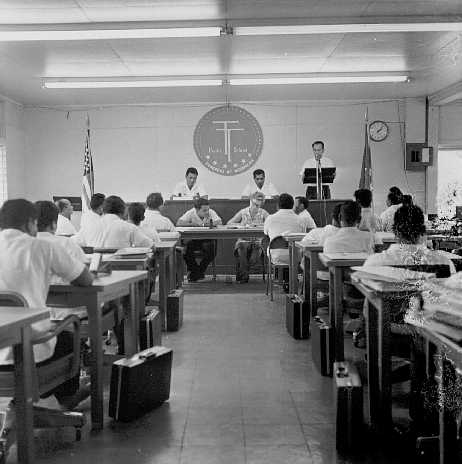
- Saipan

The Congress of Micronesia was a bicameral legislature in Trust Territory of the Pacific Islands from 1964 to 1979.

== History ==
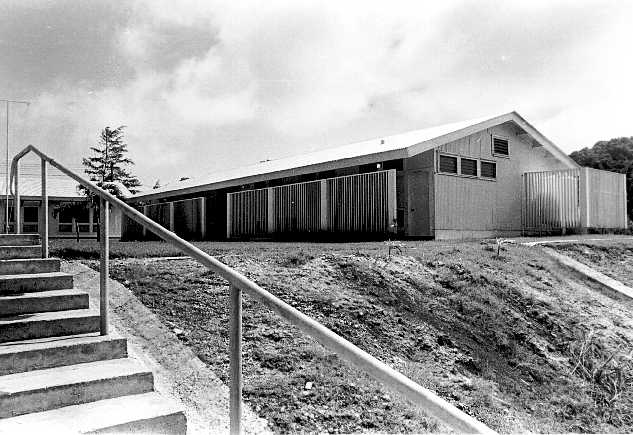
Congress of Micronesia buildings, Saipan

The Congress was established on 28 September 1964, when the US Secretary of the Interior Stewart Udall issued order no. 2882. It replaced the previous Council of Micronesia, which had been based outside the Trust Territory in Guam. The first elections were held in January 1965.

The Congress was initially composed of a House of Delegates and General Assembly, which were later renamed the Senate and House of Representatives. The Congress building was burnt down in an arson attack on 20 February 1970.

== Composition ==
The Senate had 12 members, two from each of the six districts. The House of Representatives had 21 members, with seats apportioned to each district based on their population – five from Truk, four from the Marshall Islands and Ponape, three from the Mariana Islands and Palau and two from Yap.

Elections were held every two years. Senators served four-year terms, with one Senator elected from each district at each election. All members of the House of Representatives were elected at each election.

== Presidents of the upper chamber ==
The upper chamber of Congress of Micronesia was called House of Delegates, and later Senate.

Name	Took office	Left office	District	Notes
John O. Ngiraked	July 1965	July 1965	Palau	
Tosiwo Nakayama	July 1965	July 1967	Truk	
John O. Ngiraked	July 1967	1969	Palau	
Amata Kabua	1969	Jan 1973	Marshall Islands	
Tosiwo Nakayama	Jan 1973	May 1979	Truk	

== Speakers of the lower chamber ==
The lower chamber of Congress of Micronesia was called House of Representatives.

Name	Took office	Left office	District	Notes
Dwight Heine	July 1965	1966	Marshall Islands	
Bethwel Henry	1966	May 1979	Ponape	

== Elections ==
- 1965 Trust Territory of the Pacific Islands parliamentary election
- 1966 Trust Territory of the Pacific Islands parliamentary election
- 1968 Trust Territory of the Pacific Islands parliamentary election
- 1970 Trust Territory of the Pacific Islands parliamentary election
- 1972 Trust Territory of the Pacific Islands parliamentary election
- 1974 Trust Territory of the Pacific Islands parliamentary election
- 1976 Trust Territory of the Pacific Islands parliamentary election

== See also ==
- Congress of the Federated States of Micronesia
- Legislature of the Marshall Islands
- Palau National Congress
- List of legislatures by country
