= Marshall Islands War Memorial Park =

Park and living museum in Majuro

- U.S. National Register of Historic Places
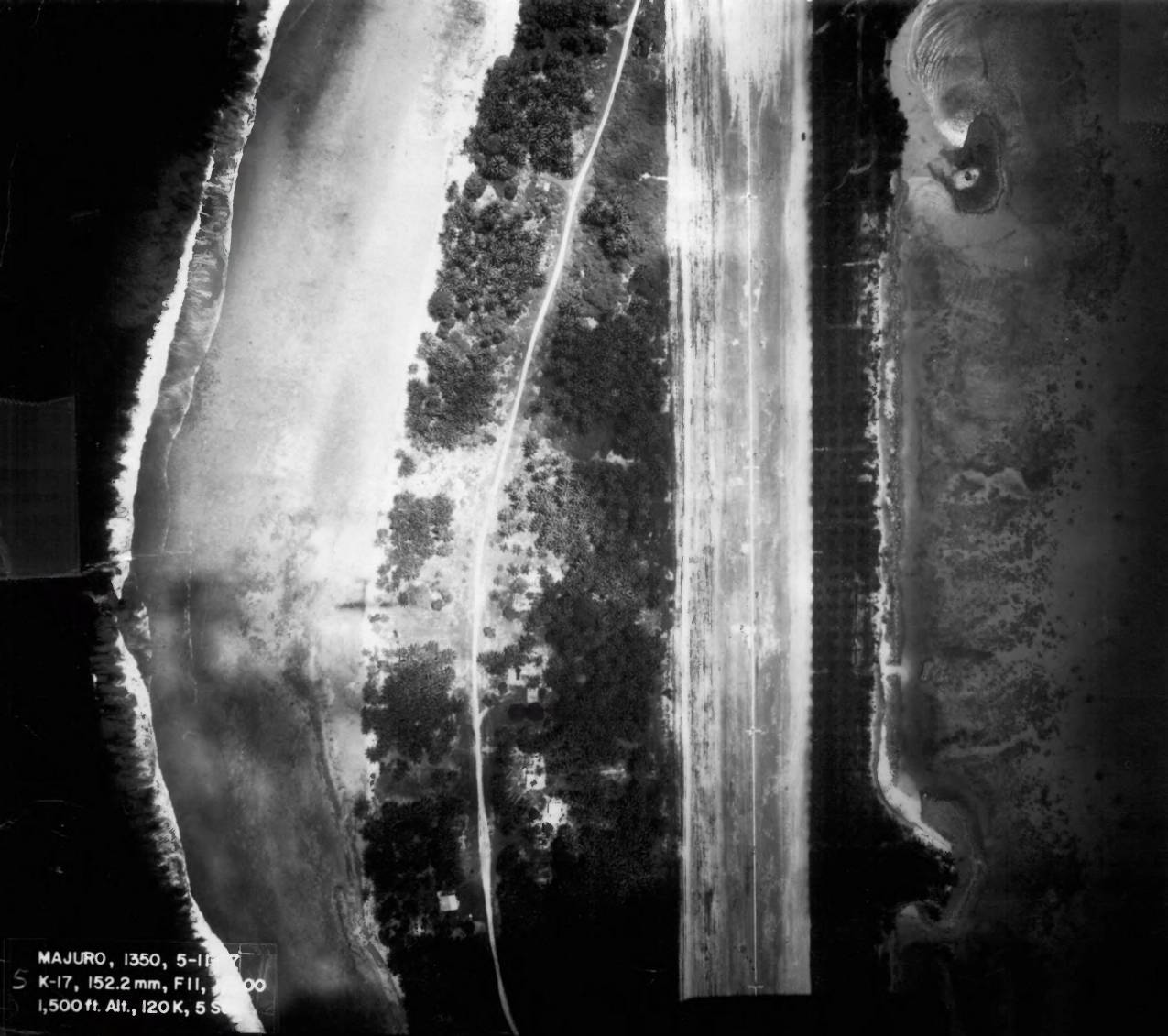

- Location within Marshall Islands
- Location: Delap, Majuro Atoll, Marshall Islands
- Coordinates: 7°5′9″N 171°22′18″E
- Area: 11.2 acres (4.5 ha)
- NRHP reference No.: 76002194
- Added to NRHP: September 30, 1976

The Marshall Islands War Memorial Park is a beachfront park and living museum located on Mieko Beach, in the Delap district of Majuro, Marshall Islands. It is one of the U.S. National Register of Historic Places sites in the former Trust Territory of the Pacific Islands.

== History ==
Majuro had been part of German New Guinea prior to World War I, when it was captured by Japan. After the war, the islands became part of the Japanese South Seas Mandate. The Gilbert and Marshall Islands campaign of World War II saw the capture of the atoll by United States on January 30, 1944, without a single shot fired; the Japanese had abandoned the island, leaving only a single warrant officer as a custodian.

The Americans subsequently set up Naval Base Majuro on the islands, home to the U.S. Headquarters Command Center for the Marshall Islands. The park encompasses a part of this area, being located next to the site of Majuro Airfield. After the war, the Marshall Islands became a part of the Trust Territory of the Pacific Islands. The airfield continued operating until 1971, when a new commercial airfield was opened on the atoll; after this, the site of the old airfield, being memorable to many as their first visual impression of the atoll, became a recreational area and a collection point for World War II artifacts from all of the Marshall Islands. The park was nominated to the U.S. National Register of Historic Places (NRHP) on June 21, 1976, and added to it on September 30. At the time, the Marshall Islands were part of the Trust Territory of the Pacific Islands.

== Park ==
The park spans a flat area of about 11.2 acres (4.5 ha) on Mieko Beach, 90% of which is covered by coconut trees were replanted in a "regular rectangular grid of 28 feet [8.5 m] center", the barren northwest end of the park being an exception. The whole northern side of the park is lagoon beachfront, a total of about 2,950 ft (900 m), while the southern side is bounded by the atoll's main highway. World War II artifacts present includes weaponry and vehicles, such as Zeros and large ammunition pieces. At the time of the nomination to the NRHP the barren northwest end of the park was being utilized as a baseball diamond, and the site was being used extensively for picnicing and festivals.
