= Delap-Uliga-Djarrit =

Urban area in Majuro, Marshall Islands

Coordinates: 7.1167°N 171.3667°E

Delap-Uliga-Djarrit Teļap-Wūlika-Jarōj
- Urban area
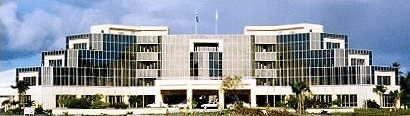
- Marshall Islands capitol building in Delap-Uliga-Djarrit

- Location within Marshall Islands
- Country: Marshall Islands
- Atoll: Majuro

Population (2011 census)
  - Total: 20,301
- Time zone: UTC+12

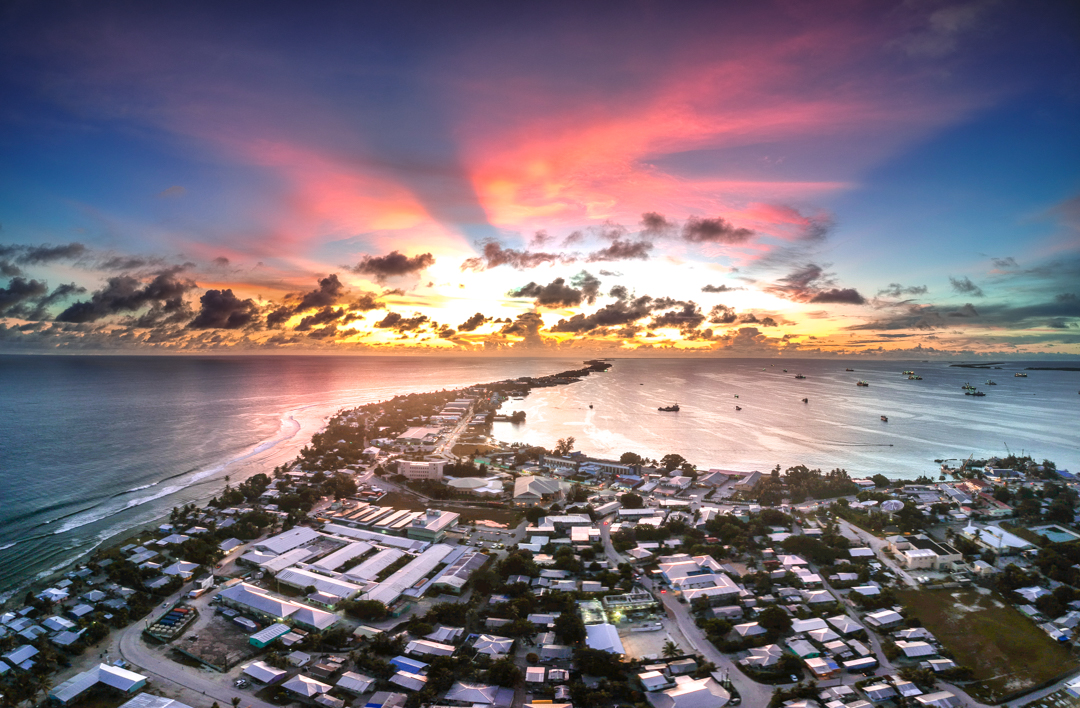
Sunset from Delap-Uliga-Darrit to Laura.

Delap-Uliga-Djarrit (DUD, Marshallese: Teļap-Wūlika-Jarōj) is an urban area in Majuro, the capital and the largest city of the Marshall Islands, with 15,846 people out of Majuro's 23,676 (as of 1999). It consists of the districts of Delap, Uliga, and Djarrit (islets connected by land reclamation). DUD is located on the eastern end of Majuro Atoll. Marshallese government buildings are situated in DUD.

== Geography ==
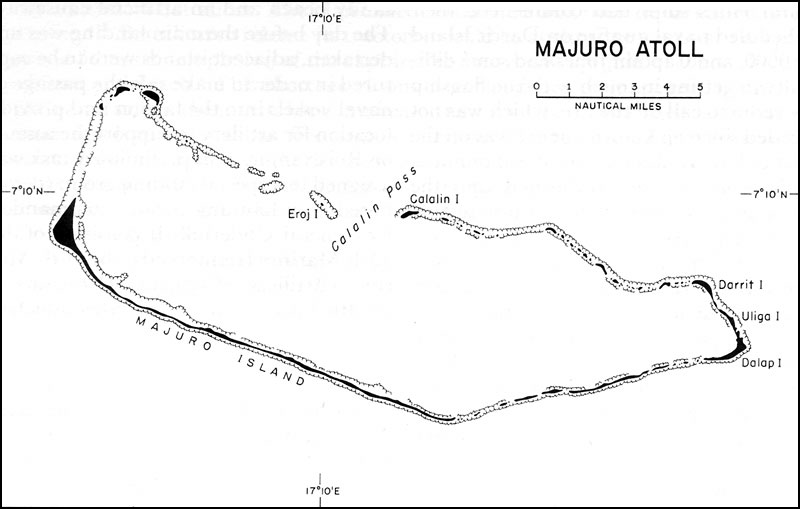
1944 map of Majuro Atoll

Delap-Uliga-Djarrit is a densely populated urban area on the eastern end of Majuro Atoll. DUD is located on the three islets of Delap, Uliga, and Djarrit (from south to north). Causeways connecting the islands were constructed in 1944. The increasing population has led to extensive land reclamation on both the lagoon and the exterior coasts, with Delap and Uliga seeing the largest increase in land area (over 10%).

== History ==
Traditionally the center of Majuro Atoll was an islet now called Laura, which has been inhabited for over 2,000 years. Majuro Atoll, along with the rest of the Marshall Islands, became part of the German Empire in 1885, and afterwards the Jaluit Trading Company established a trading outpost. As with the rest of the Marshalls, Majuro was captured by the Imperial Japanese Navy in 1914 during World War I and mandated to the Empire of Japan by the League of Nations in 1920. The island then became a part of the Japanese mandated territory of the South Seas Mandate; although the Japanese had established a government in the mandate, local affairs were mostly left in the hands of traditional local leaders until the start of World War II. In 1940, Japan built a seaplane base in the leeward part of the east of the atoll, located primarily on Djarrit. This choice of location was motivated by the lagoon being suitable for large ships, and the presence of patch reefs in the west, which made seaplane activities dangerous. The base was abandoned in late 1942.

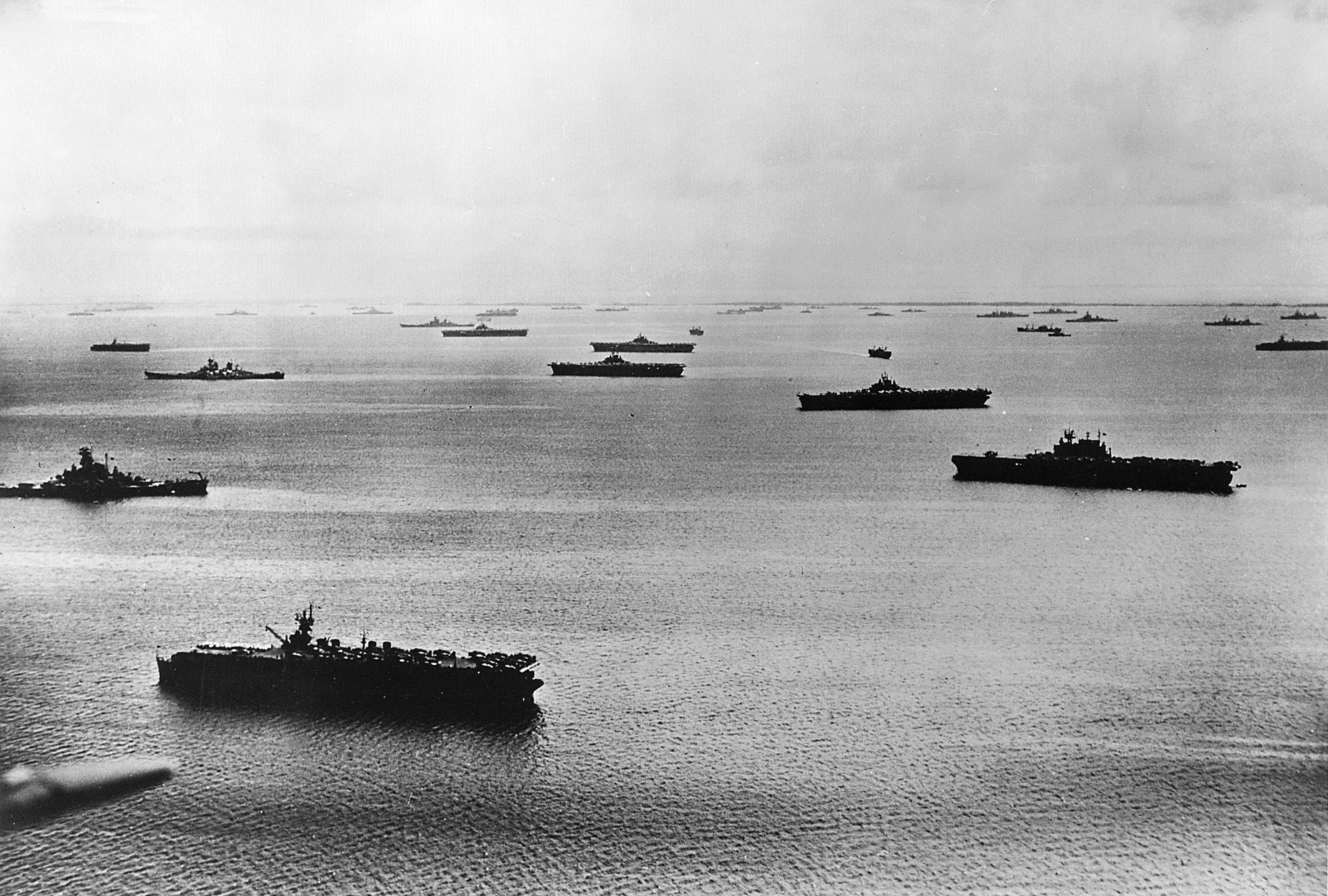
U.S. Fifth Fleet at Majuro Atoll 1944.

United States troops landed on the atoll on January 31, 1944 and promptly began building the major Naval Base Majuro, finished later that year. American forces set up and improved infrastructure, including a runway covering much of Delap (Majuro Airfield), and military headquarters at Uliga and Djarrit. Indigenous inhabitants of the area were forcibly relocated to the Majuro islet of Laura. By 1947 only a small administrative unit had remained, with the military having rapidly demobilized in 1945. The American administration made Majuro replace Jaluit as the capital of the Marshall Islands, due to the devastation of Jaluit during the war, and the presence of a US base on Majuro. In 1947, the Marshallese began returning to Delap and Djarrit, and the Delap runway began to be used for civil aviation. Rapid housing development took place in Delap-Uliga-Djarrit, which became the commercial and administrative center of the atoll. The population rapidly increased due to birth rates and internal migration. In 1970, the international airport was shifted west to the newly-built Amata Kabua International Airport to enable the expansion of Delap. In 1986, the Marshall Islands became independent and Majuro became the national capital.

== Demographics ==
As of early 1944, about 400 people lived in small villages in Delap and Djarrit, while Uliga was not reported as being inhabited. Delap-Uliga-Djarrit was very sparsely populated in 1947, but it now has one of the highest population densities out of urban areas in the Pacific Islands. DUD's population increased from 2,387 people in 1958, to 5,829 in 1970, to 8,003 in 1973. In 1988, around 11,200 people lived in an area smaller than 1.5 km^{2} (0.6 mi^{2}) in DUD, while Djarrit had a population density of 17,537 people per km^{2}. As of 1999, the population of DUD was 15,846 people out of Majuro's 23,676; DUD had a population density of 8506 people per km^{2}. DUD's population was 20,301 on 1.32 km^{2} (0.5 mi^{2}) as of the 2011 census.

== Economy ==
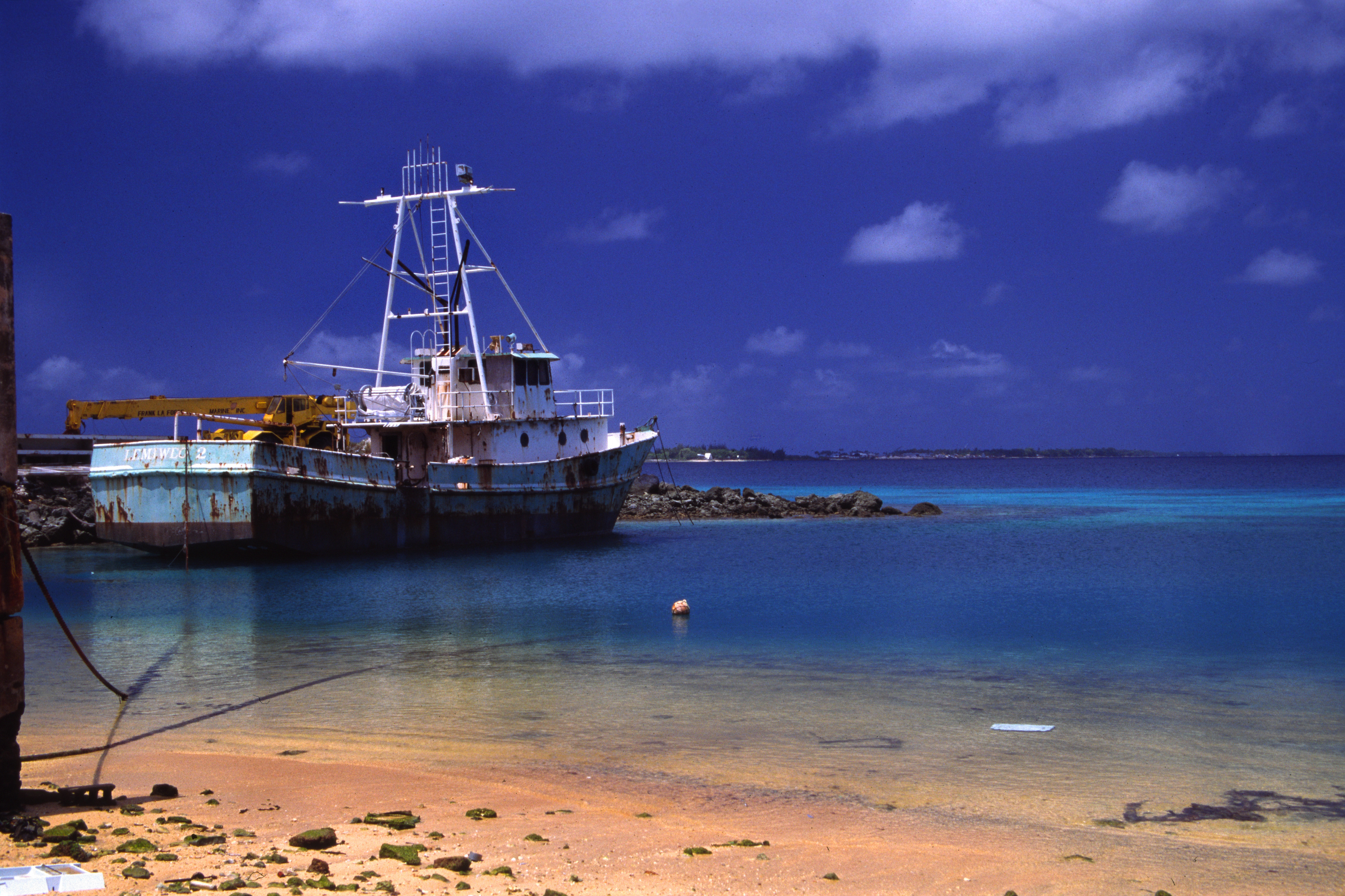
Harbour of Delap-Uliga-Djarrit

Delap-Uliga-Djarrit contains Majuro's port, as well as shops, banks, restaurants, and hotels.

In the early 1970s, "almost all" of the annual budget of Delap-Uliga-Djarrit was reported to come from alcohol taxes and fees, as only DUD, Laura, and Kwajalein Atoll in the Marshall Islands were "wet", i.e. alcohol sales were allowed.

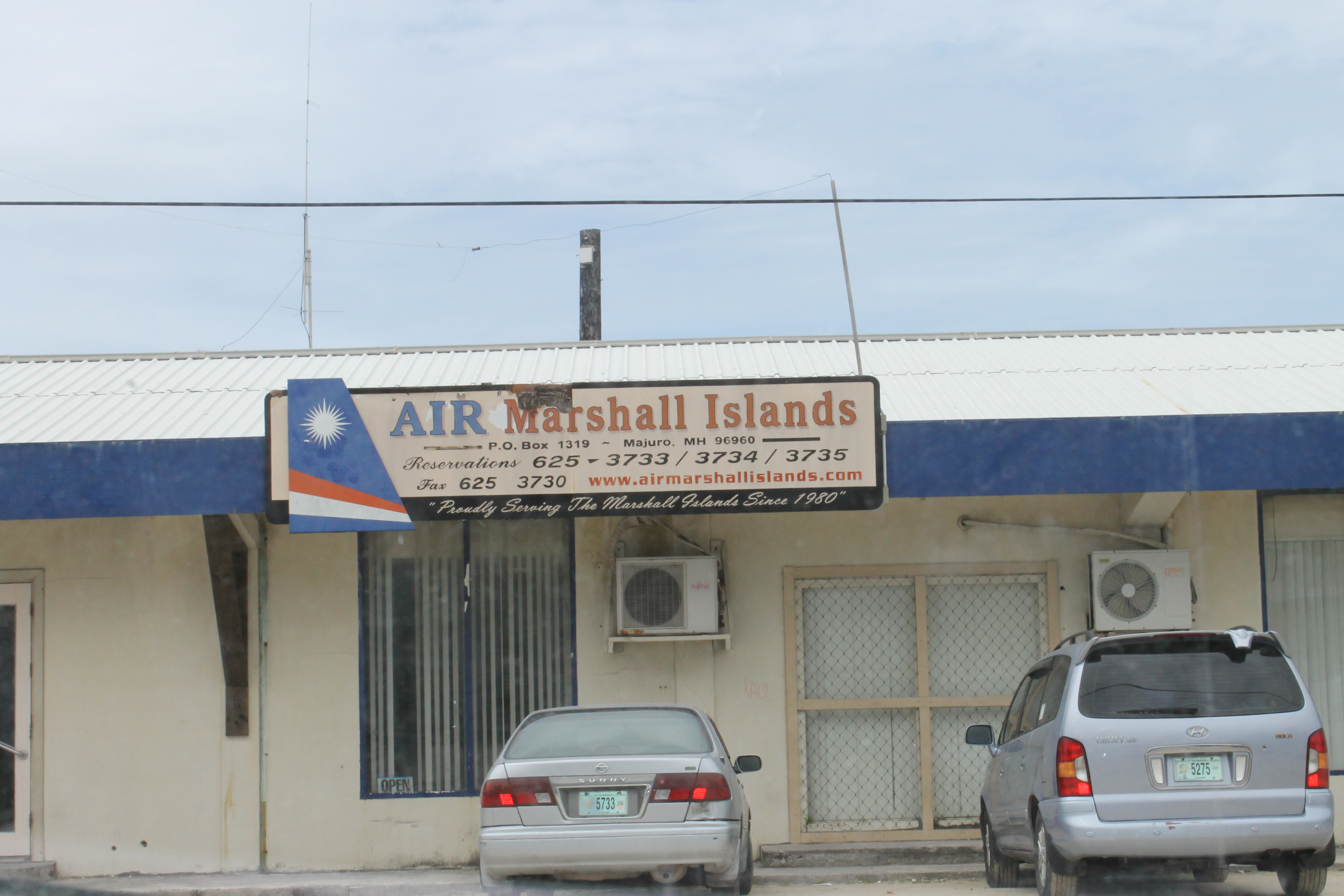
Air Marshall Islands Headquarters in Majuro

Majuro's economy is driven by the service sector, which composed 86% of the GDP in 2011.

On September 15, 2007, Witon Barry, of the Tobolar Copra processing plant in the Marshall Islands' capital of Majuro, said power authorities, private companies and entrepreneurs had been experimenting with coconut oil as an alternative to diesel fuel for vehicles, power generators, and ships. Coconut trees abound in the Pacific's tropical islands. Copra from 6 to 10 coconuts makes 1 litre of oil.

Air Marshall Islands has its headquarters in Majuro.

== Points of interest ==
Alele Museum is located in Delap-Uliga-Djarrit. The Cathedral of the Assumption of the Roman Catholic Apostolic Prefecture of the Marshall Islands and Baet-Ul-Ahad Mosque are located in town center.

== Health ==
The 101-bed Majuro Hospital (officially the Leroij Atama Zedkeia Medical Center) is the main hospital for Majuro, as well as many of the outer islands. The country's only other major hospital is on Ebeye Island, the Leroij Kitlang Memorial Health Center. As of 2015, most of the 43 physicians employed by the Marshall Islands were located at the Majuro Hospital. The Laura and Rongrong Health Centers are also located on the atoll of Majuro.

== Education ==
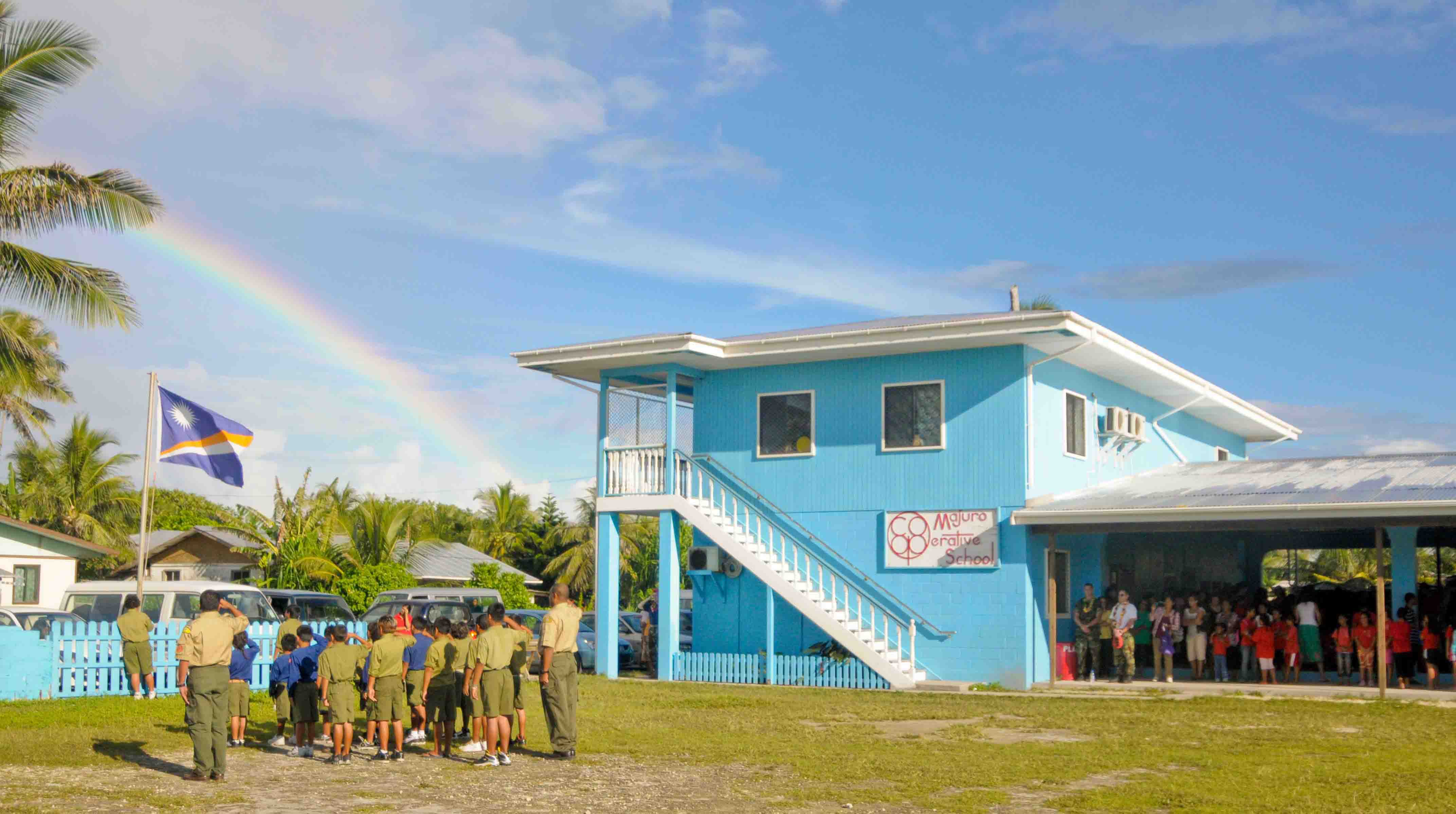
Students at the Majuro Cooperative School raise the Republic of Marshall Islands flag at a ceremony during a Pacific Partnership 2009 community service project

Located in Delap-Uliga-Djarrit are the College of the Marshall Islands, Assumption High School, and Uliga Elementary School. English is taught to all students.

The Marshall Islands High School is near the north end of the town.

The University of South Pacific has a presence on Delap-Uliga-Djarrit.

Delap-Uliga-Djarrit has the Seventh Day Adventist High School and Elementary School where English is taught to all students.
