= National Register of Historic Places listings in the Marshall Islands =

Location of the Marshall Islands in the western Pacific

The National Register of Historic Places is a United States federal official list of places and sites considered worthy of preservation. In the Marshall Islands, a country in Micronesia, there are currently 4 listed sites located in three of the 24 atolls that make up the archipelago. This includes buildings, sites, districts, and objects

This National Park Service list is complete through NPS recent listings posted November 13, 2026.

== Listings ==
| | Name on the Register | Image | Date listed | Location | Atoll | Description |
|---|---|---|---|---|---|---|
| 1 | Debrum House | Debrum House | September 30, 1976 (#76002160) | Likiep Island; 9°49′21″N 169°18′23″E | Likiep | |
| 2 | Kwajalein Island Battlefield | Kwajalein Island Battlefield | February 4, 1985 (#85001757) | Kwajalein Missile Range; 8°43′08″N 167°43′55″E | Kwajalein | This landmark district encompasses the entire bounds of Kwajalein Island at the time of the 1944 Battle of Kwajalein. (The island has since changed in size due to dredging and filling projects.) |
| 3 | Marshall Islands War Memorial Park | Marshall Islands War Memorial Park | September 30, 1976 (#76002194) | Dalap Island; 7°05′09″N 171°22′18″E | Majuro | |
| 4 | Roi-Namur Battlefield | Roi-Namur Battlefield | February 4, 1985 (#85001758) | Kwajalein Missile Range; 9°23′44″N 167°28′33″E | Kwajalein | This landmark district encompasses the entire island of Roi-Namur. |

== See also ==
- List of United States National Historic Landmarks in United States commonwealths and territories, associated states, and foreign states
