= Rairok =

Coordinates: 7°04′18″N 171°18′54″E

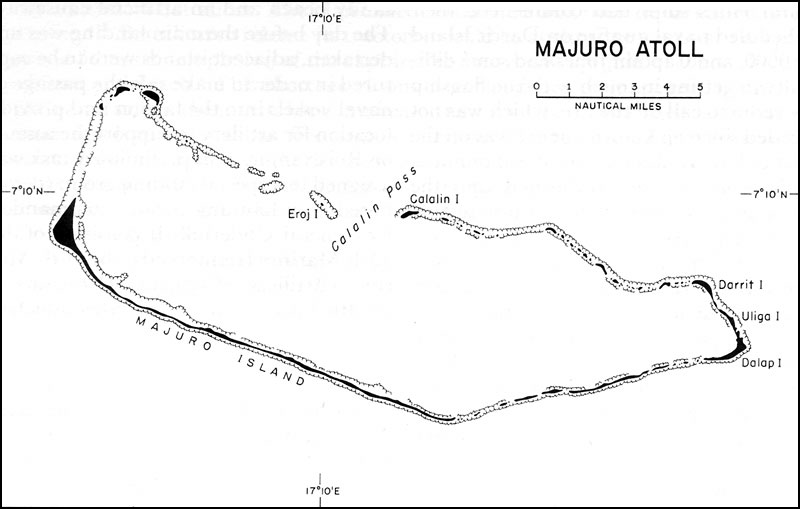
Majuro Atoll map

Rairok (Marshallese: Rairōk, [rˠɑːiːrˠɤk]) is a town in the Marshall Islands. It is located on the southeastern side Majuro Atoll, between Delap in the east and Ajeltake in the west.

On January 30, 1944, United States troops invaded and built a large base, Naval Base Majuro.

== Demographics ==
Population about 2000 with half under the age of 15. As of the census of 1988, the population numbered 2021, on a land area of 0.622 km^{2} (62.2 hectares). Almost half of the population (924 out of 2021) were under the age of 15. In 1999, the population count was 3846, and for 2009, the population was estimated at 6390. There is an elementary school, a small dry goods store and a bus stop. It overlooks the inner bay of the Majuro Atoll.

Marshall Islands International Airport, located immediately west of Rairok Islet, is considered part of the town. It had been built on Anenelibw and Lokojbar islets.
