= Djarrit =

Marshall Islands island district

Coordinates: 7°07′29″N 171°21′54″E

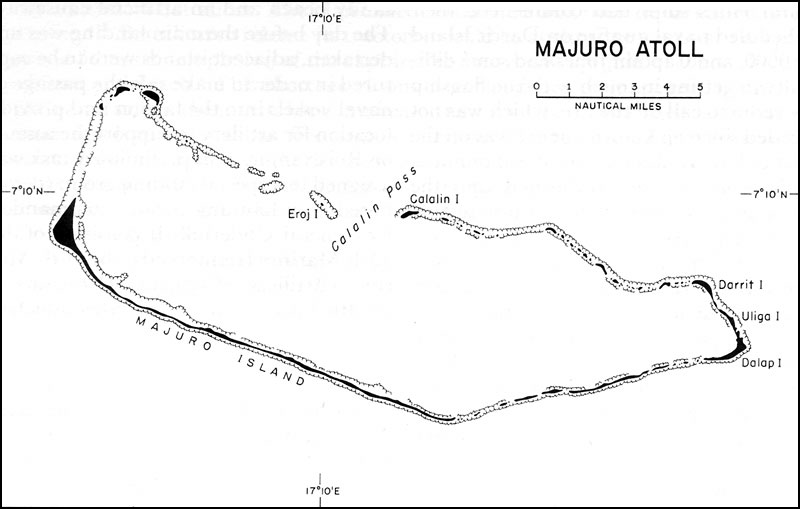
Majuro Atoll map

Djarrit (also called Darrit and Rita; Marshallese: Jarōj, [tʲɑrˠʌtʲ]) is an island district in the Marshall Islands. It is located in the east of Majuro Atoll. Along with Uliga and Delap, it forms what is known as the "Delap-Uliga-Djarrit".

Djarrit is largely residential and is the home of Rita Elementary School and Marshall Islands High School, the largest public primary and secondary schools in the Marshall Islands. A road connects Djarrit with Laura at the western end of the atoll. It passes through the Marshall Islands International Airport.

The name Rita was bestowed by American GIs on the large Naval Base Majuro in honor of film star Rita Hayworth.
