= Cathedral of the Assumption, Majuro =

Cathedral of the Assumption
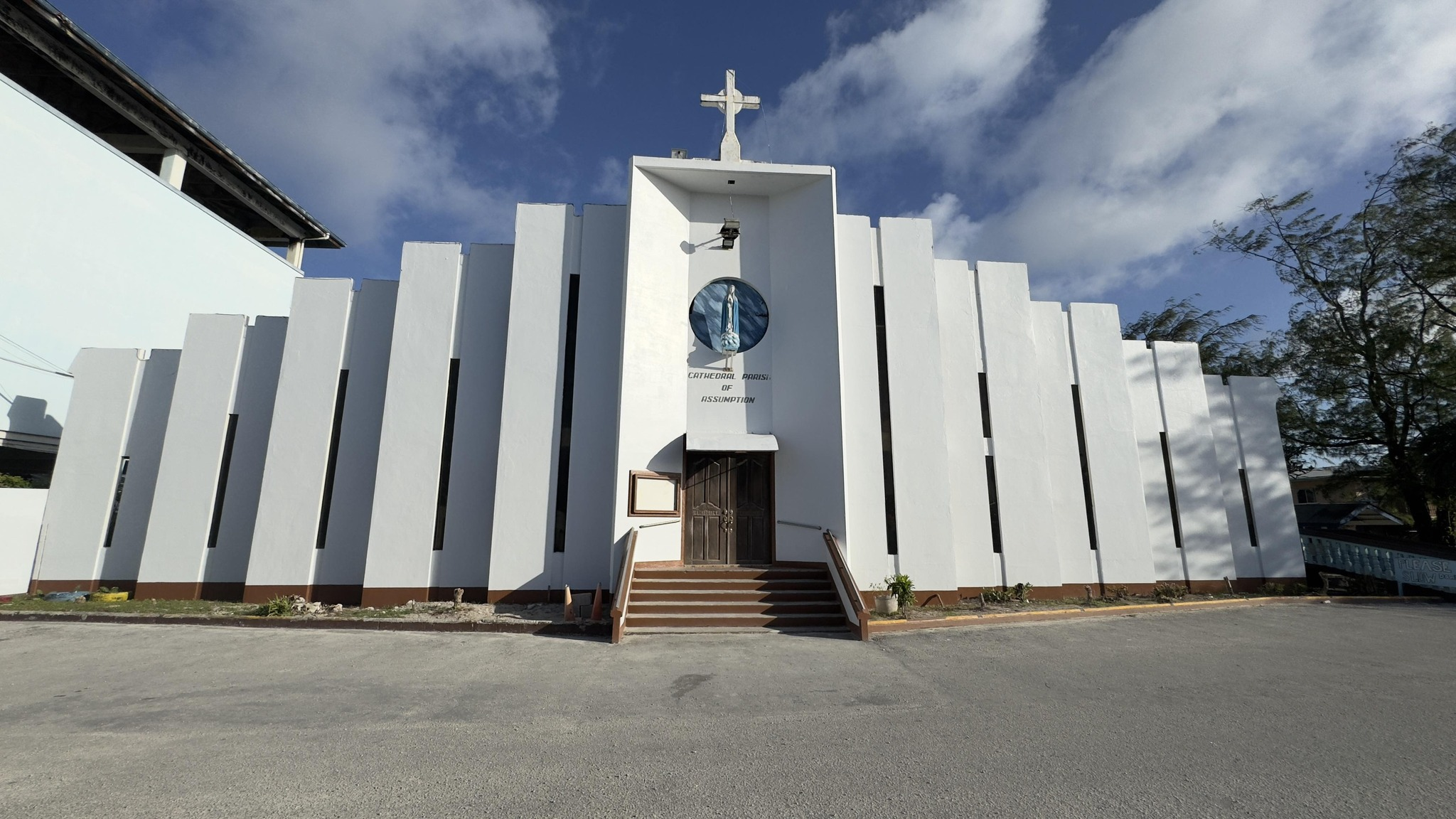

- Location within Marshall Islands Location within Oceania
- 07°06′7.74″N 171°22′42.69″E
- Location: Delap-Uliga-Djarrit
- Country: Marshall Islands
- Denomination: Catholic Church

Administration
- Diocese: Apostolic Prefecture of the Marshall Islands

Clergy
- Priest(s): Fr. Ariel Galido, MSC (Prefect)

The Cathedral of the Assumption is a Catholic cathedral located in Majuro, Republic of the Marshall Islands. It is the seat of the Apostolic Prefecture of the Marshall Islands, which covers the entire country, as well as Wake Atoll (dependent on the United States). It is located in the city center.

The current apostolic prefect is Raymundo Sabio. It was built in 1898, with the arrival of the missionaries of the Order of the Sacred Heart in Majuro Atoll. It is separated from the Diocese of the Carolines and Marshall Islands on April 23, 1993, under Pope John Paul II. The Apostolic Prefecture was established on 23 April 1993, separating it from the Diocese of the Carolines and Marshall Islands. James Gould became its first apostolic prefect, serving until 2007. He was succeeded by Raymundo Sabio, followed by Ariel Galido. In January 2025, Pope Francis appointed Tamati Alefosio Sefo as prefect. Sefo was installed at the cathedral on 29 March 2025.

== Overview ==
James Gould, a Jesuit, was the first apostolic prefect of the Marshall Islands. He served from 1993 to 2007 and was followed by Raymundo Sabio, M.S.C., until 2017, and then Ariel Galido, M.S.C., until his resignation in January 2025. Sabio died in 2022. On 14 January 2025 the Pope appointed Tamati Alefosio Sefo, M.S.C., then parish priest of Saint Peter Chanel in Samoa, as prefect. Sefo was born in Samoa in 1972 and ordained in 2004. He was canonically installed at Assumption Church on 29 March 2025, becoming the prefecture's fourth prefect, at a ceremony attended by archbishops from Samoa and Guam and the Bishop of Tarawa and Nauru.
