= Naval Base Majuro =

Main World War II Naval Base in Marshall Islands

- United States Navy Base
- Location of Majuro in Marshall Islands Naval Base Majuro (Pacific Ocean) Naval Base Majuro (Earth)
- Island Chain: Ratak Chain
- Founded: 1944
- Time zone: UTC+12 (MHT)

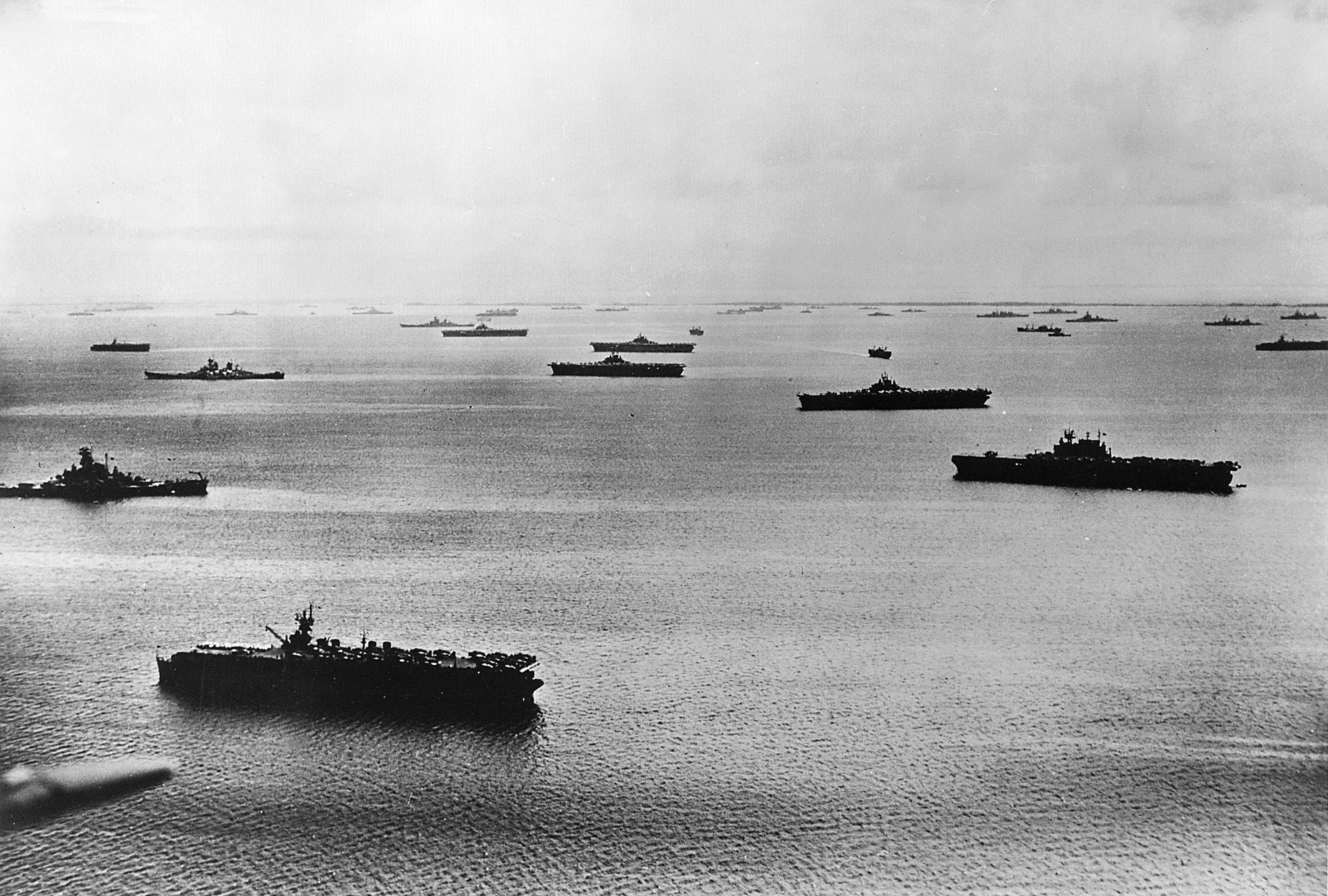
United States Fifth Fleet at Majuro Atoll in 1944

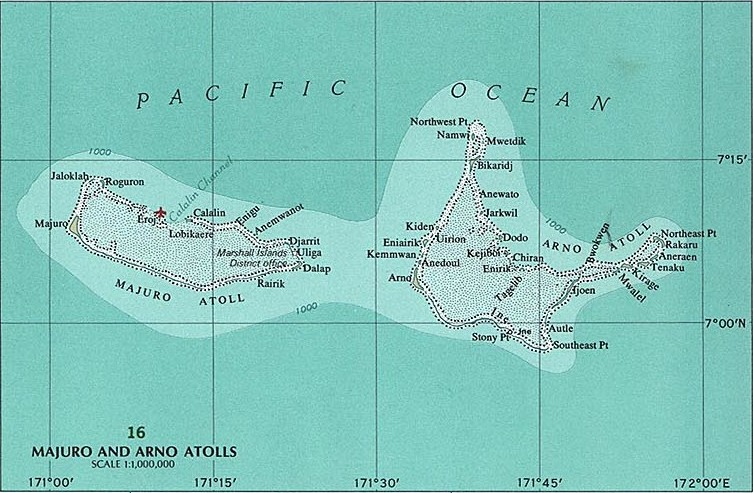
Map Majuro and Arno Atolls

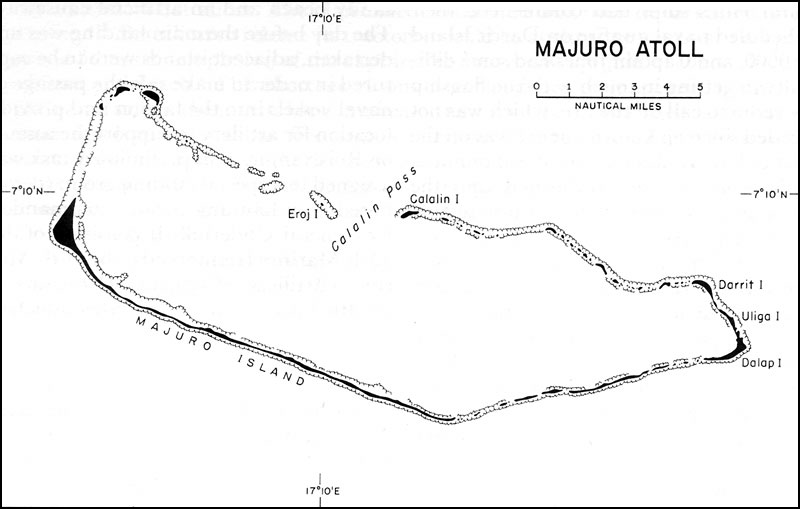
Schematic overview of Majuro

Naval Base Majuro was a major United States Navy base built on Majuro Atoll, in the Marshall Islands to support the World War II efforts in the Pacific War. The base was built after the Battle of Majuro-Kwajalein ended 3 February 1944. Majuro was found to be unoccupied and abandoned when the United States Army arrived. The US Navy built airfields, a seaport, and other facilities on the captured islands. The base was part of the vast Naval Base Marshall Islands.

== History ==
When the US Army arrived they found abandoned at Darrit Island a 400-foot timber pier, a seaplane ramp, and warehouses, as well as a 5,800-foot runway at Dalop Island. US Navy Seabees of the 100th Construction Battalion began improvement projects at the base. On Delap the 5,800 feet (1,800 m) by 445 feet (136 m) runway was repaired and paved in coral. The complete Majuro Airfield became home to a number of units: two Marine dive-bomber squadrons, half a Marine patrol squadron, and staging a United States Army Air Forces fighter group. The Navy used the Airfield for its Naval Air Transport Service and patrols. The Majuro Atoll offered excellent fleet anchorage in the large protected lagoon. The lagoon has depths of 150 to 210-feet, with only a few coral heads. The lagoon islands had some sand beaches used for boats, landing craft and tank landing ships. On Calanin Island, at the entrance to the lagoon Seabees built a signal station and a harbor entrance control station.

Seabees built and manned at Acorn 8 Naval dispensary. Seabees used both new construction Quonset huts and captured buildings in their projects. Seabees built a 150-bed hospital. For the airfield, Seabees built a 12,000-barrel fuel depot for aviation gasoline storage on Bigariat Island and 4-inch pipe system to bring it to the airfield. For freshwater Seabees installed a water distillation plant. The 21 distillation stills turned seawater into 50,000 gallons of fresh water per day. The water was stored in a system of tanks and plumbing with a total of 180,000 gallons for all the islands in the base. Water tank trucks were used for long runs. The one captured pier was not able to keep up with the demands of the growing base, Seabees installed a deep-water 25 by 28 foot pontoon floating pier. Seabees used coral to pave 10 miles of road and the top of 11,000 feet of causeways, making Delap-Uliga-Djarrit. The causeways were built to connect the many small base islands together. A large Seabee camp, repair shops, and supply depot were built. For the troop barracks, mess halls, bomb-proof shelters, and recreation facilities were constructed by the Seabees. Almost all of Dalop Island was taken up by the airfield, so the islets of Uliga, Laura, Rairok, and others of the Majuro Atoll were used. In February 1944 the 100th Battalion was relieved with the arrival of Construction Battalion Detachment 1034. On 18 June 1944 the 60th Seabee Battalion was relieved with the arrival of Construction Battalion Maintenance Unit (CBMU) 591. Unlike most Pacific Navy bases, Naval Base Majuro was moved to a more forward location as the fighting moved towards Japan's homeland. On V-J Day, surrender of Japan on 2 September 1945 the base was still in full operation.

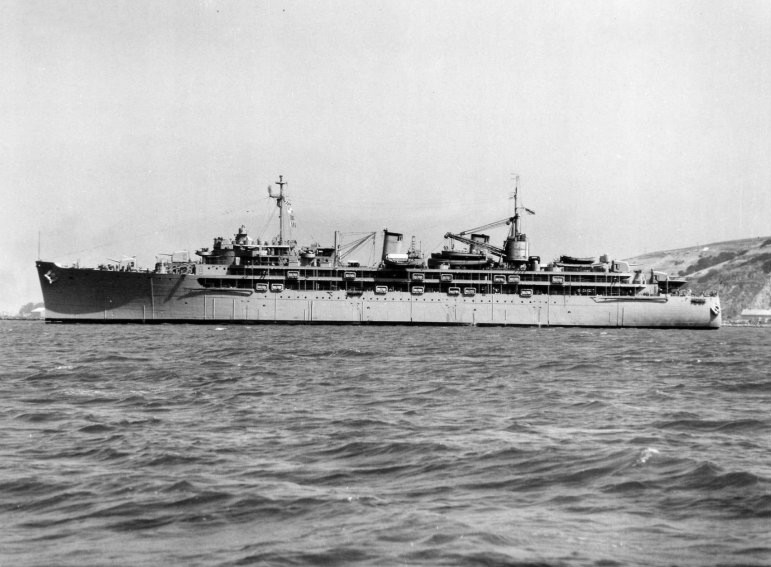
USS Bushnell AS-15 submarine tender

== Majuro Submarine Base ==
The demand for submarine bases during World War 2 was so great that bases were built around special ships called submarine tenders. Submarine Tenders carried fuel for the submarines, food for the crew, and living quarters for the crew to rest while the sub was being serviced. The Tender's depot had all the supplies that the submarine needed to get back on patrol. Submarine base had limited land facilities such Naval Base Majuro operated as an advanced submarine base. Sub-crews enjoyed the 750-man submarine base camp and fleet recreation center at the base. Majuro Submarine Base was supported by the submarine tenders: USS Howard W. Gilmore (AS-16), USS Bushnell (AS-15), USS Argonne (AS-10), and USS Sperry (AS-12).

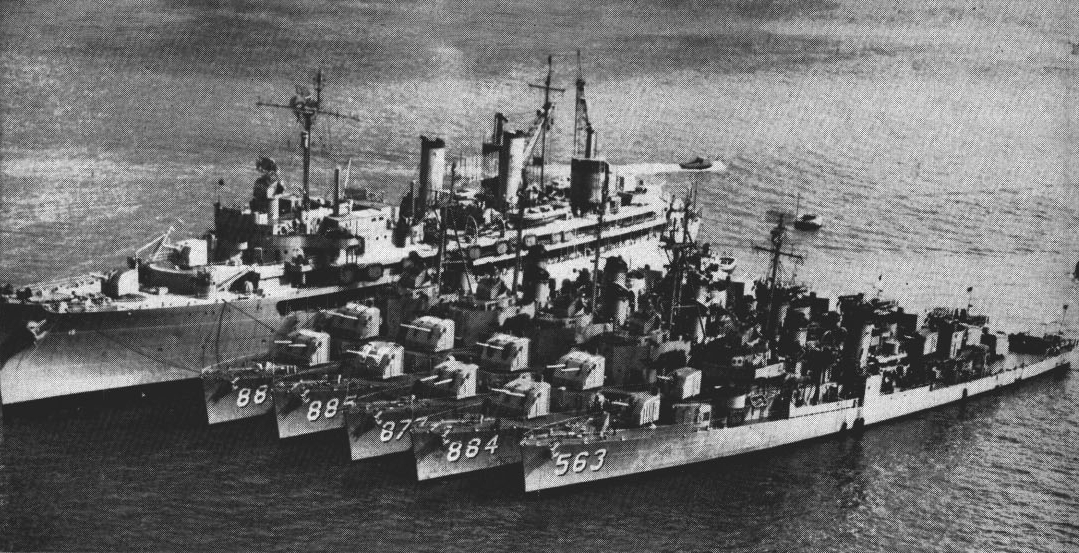
Destroyer tender USS Prairie tied up with USS Ross (DD-563) and other destroyers

== Majuro Destroyer Base ==
To keep US Navy destroyer in the war and not at faraway bases, Majuro became a Destroyer Base. US Navy destroyer tenders provided food, fuel, and ammunition to the destroyer. Minor repair work was also done at the base. The crew was able to enjoy the fleet recreation center at the base during this time. The base was made with stationed destroyer tenders: USS Prairie (AD-15) and USS Markab

== Airfields ==
US Navy Seabees built two airfields at Naval Base Majuro :

- Majuro Airfield, called Naval Air Facility Majuro
- Uliga Airfield on Uliga Island

A number of bombers and fighter squadrons operated from the airfields. For aircraft navigation, a loran transmitting station was built.
The Naval stations at the Marshall Islands had stationed:

- Vought F4U Corsair
- Grumman F6F Hellcat with VF-39
- Douglas TBD Devastator
- Grumman TBF Avenger
- Curtiss XBTC for Scouting bombing (VSB)
- Utility-Transport (VJR) planes, like the Douglas R4D and Douglas R5D

At Majuro Airfield the Navy supported the installment of the 4th Marine Aircraft Wing and the Marine Aircraft Group 13 in March 1944. The Seabees constructed two 750-man camps, shops and storage facilities for the United States Marine Corps.
The Navy decided to place a pool of fighter planes ready to replace losses on Aircraft carrier at Naval Base Majuro. As Majuro Airfield did not have the space for the new air base, Seabees built a new 4,000 foot by 175-foot runway on Uliga Island. Uliga Island was connected to Dalop by the built two-lane causeway. Two Carrier Aircraft Service Units were based as the airfields to support the many Navy planes at the base.

== Post war ==
- Marshall Islands War Memorial Park on Delap

== Gallery ==
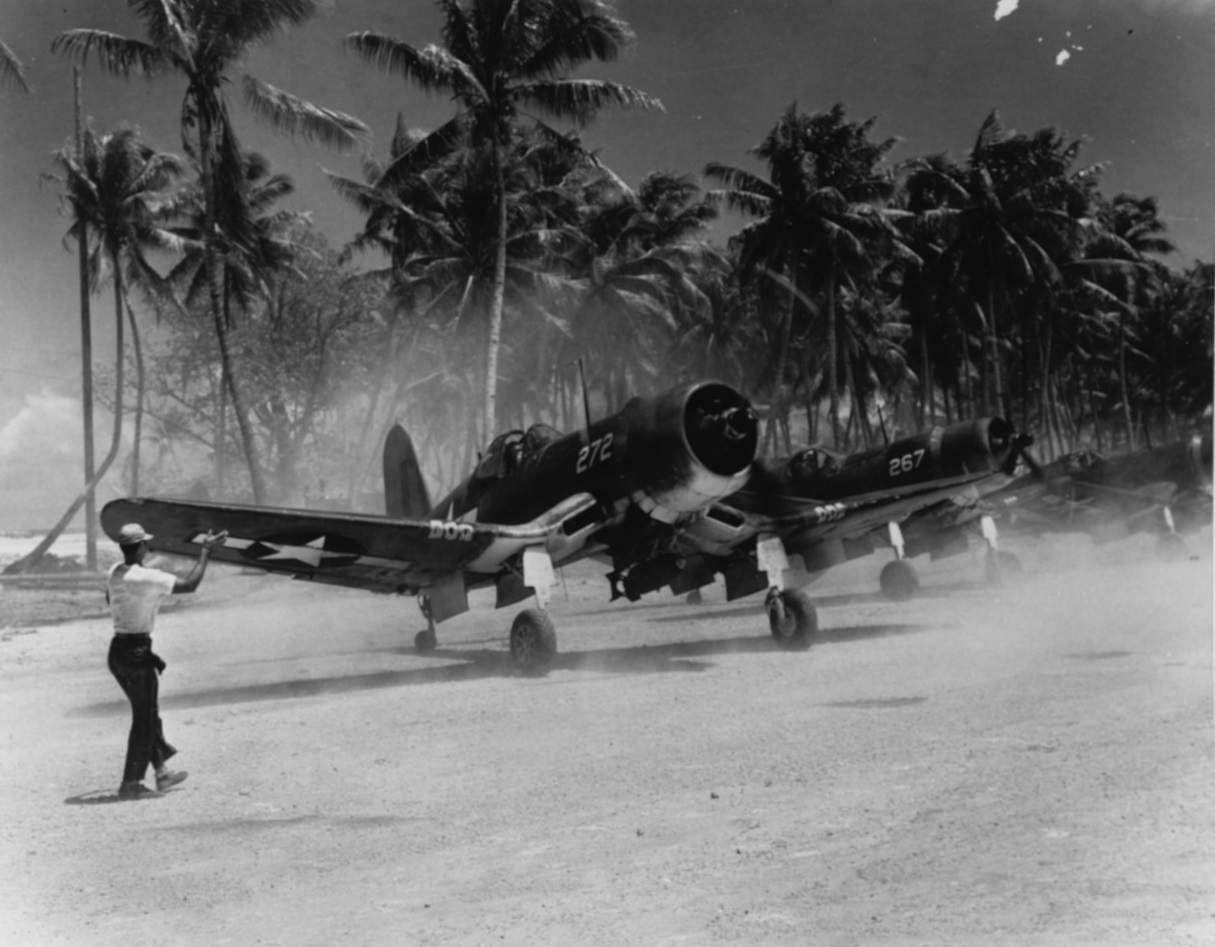
Vought F4U Corsair fighters at Majuro

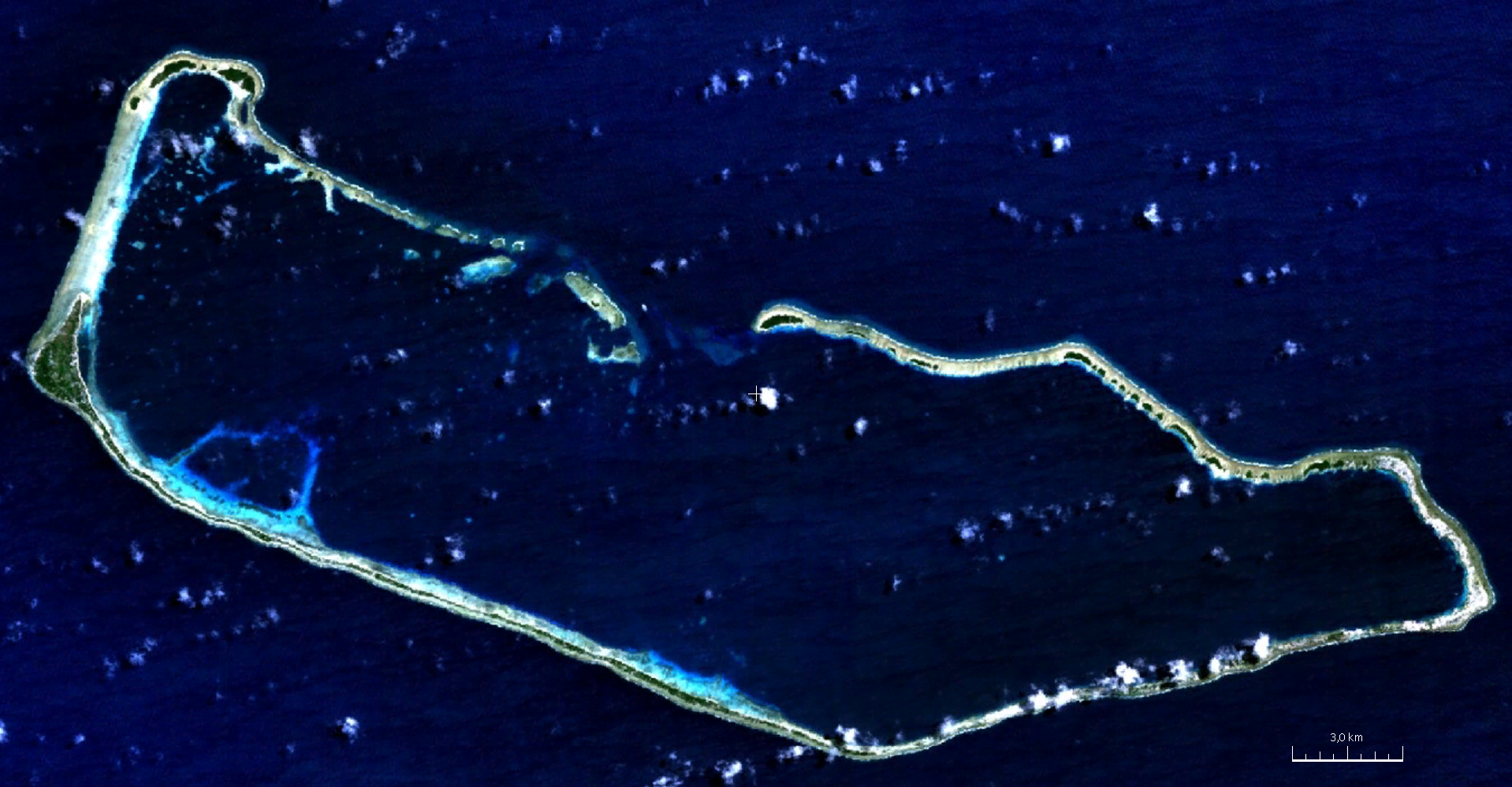
Majuro Atoll Satellite photo

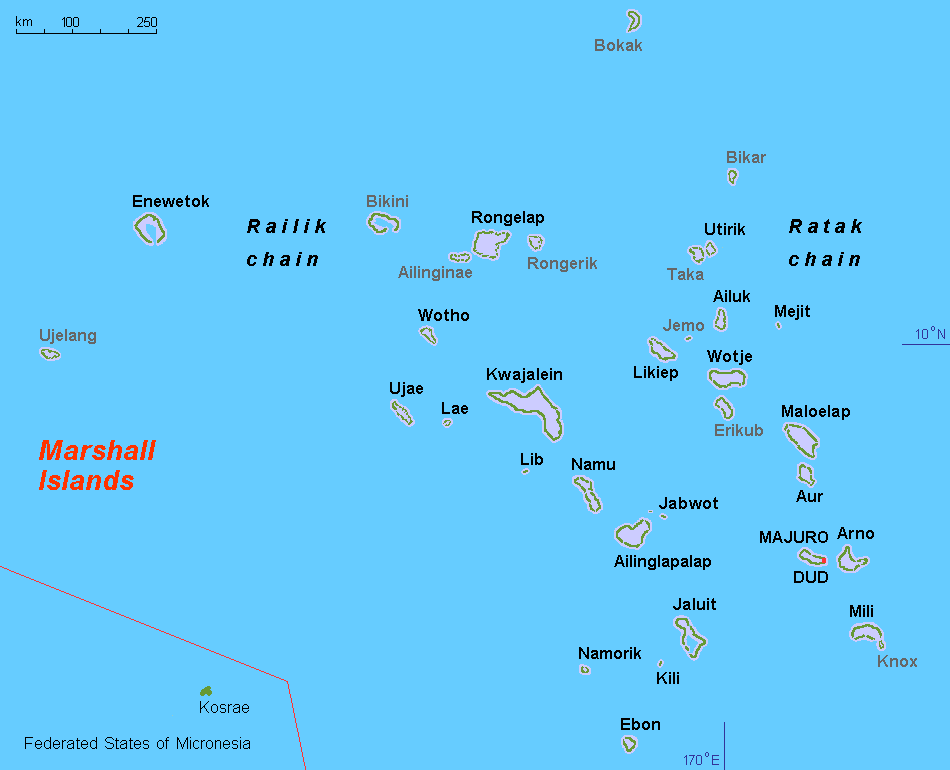
Map of the Marshall Islands

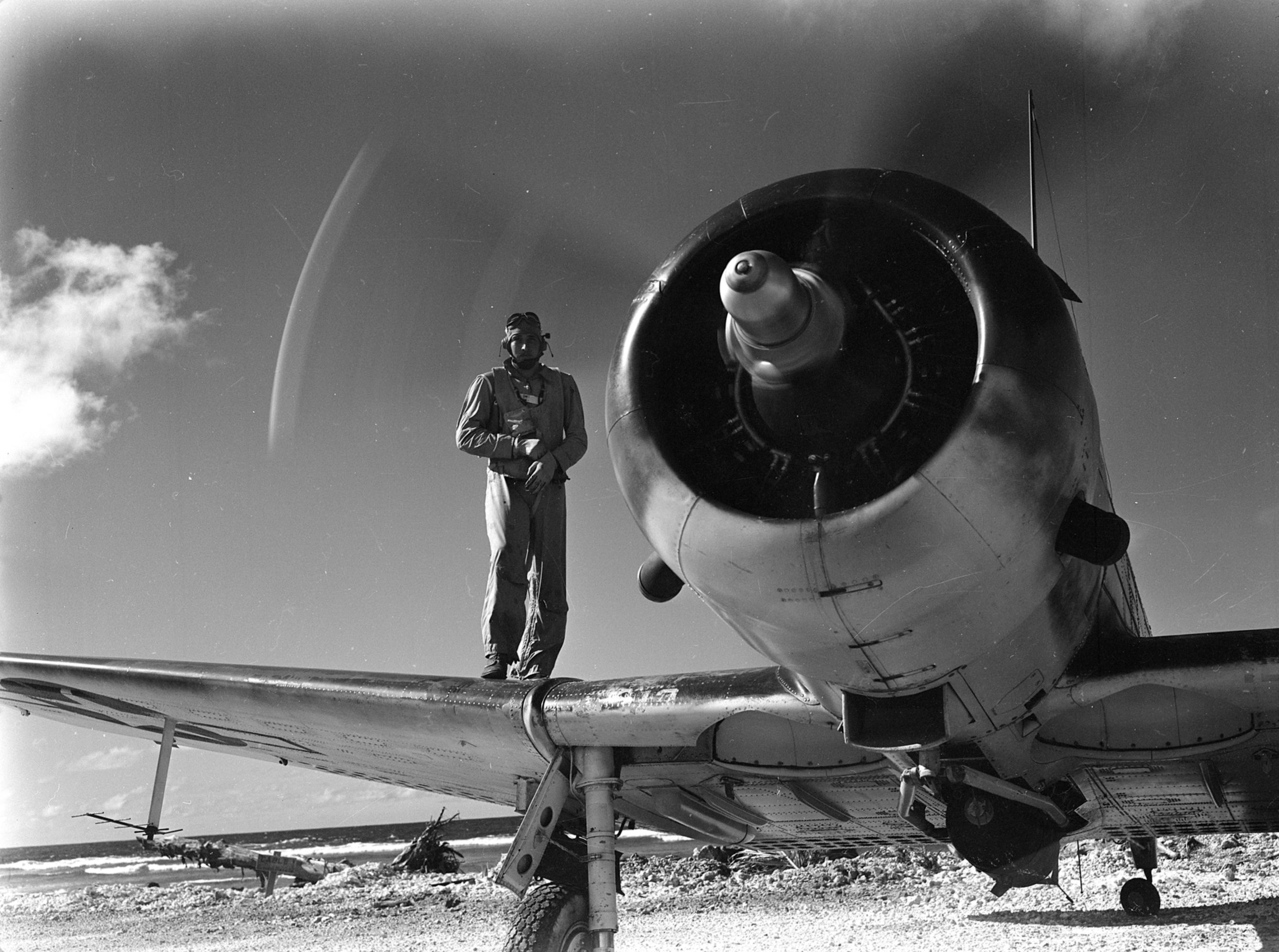
Douglas SBD Dauntless dive bomber at Majuro

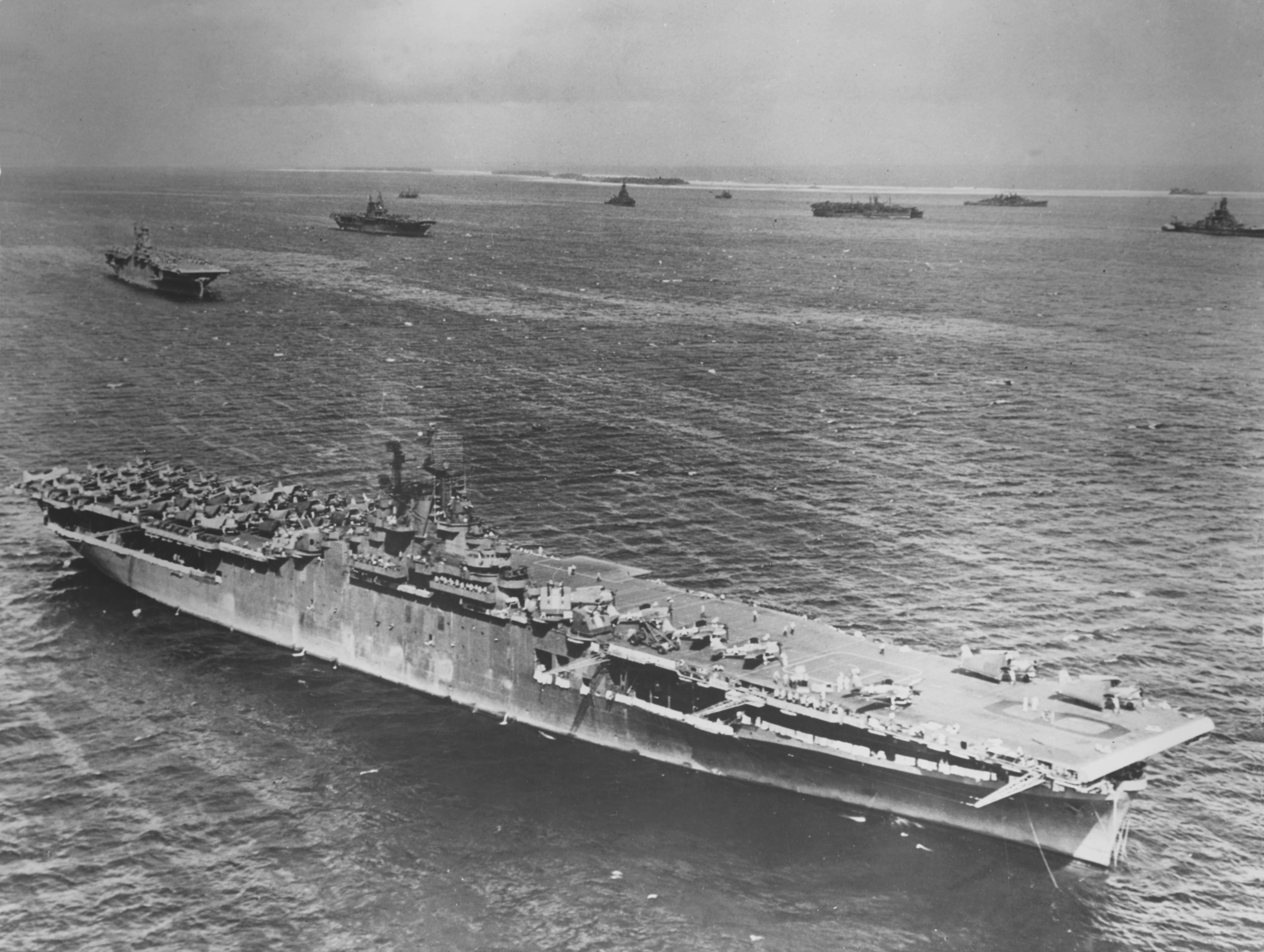
USS Essex (CV-9) at Majuro Atoll on 2 March 1944.jpg

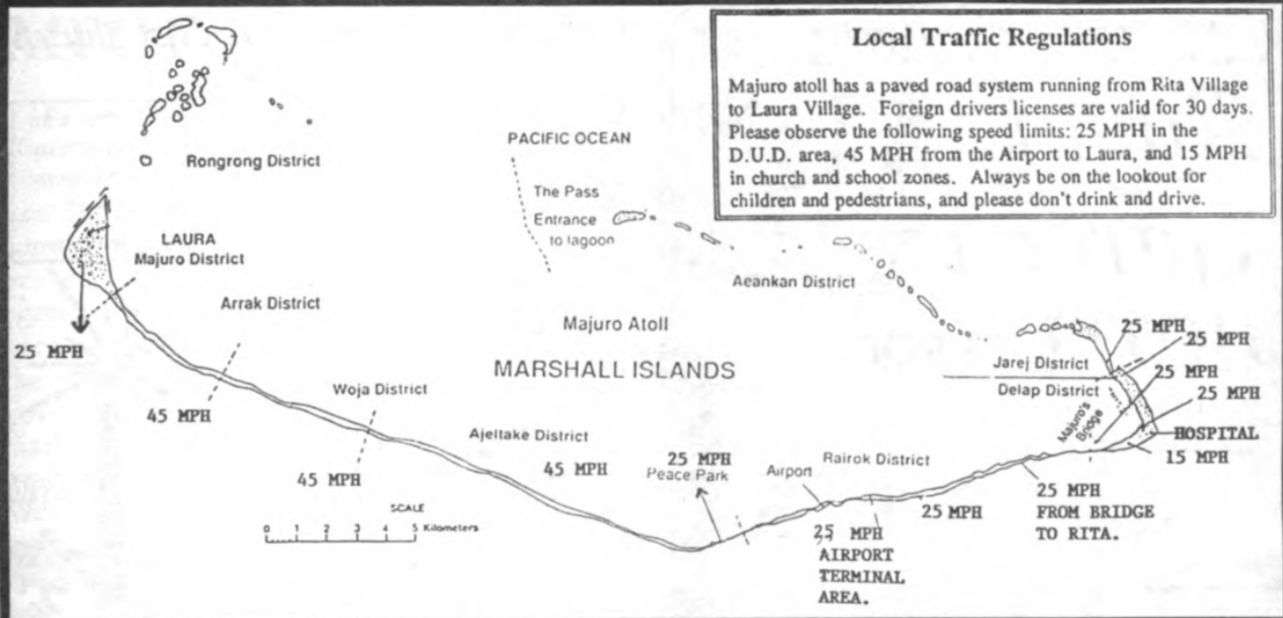
Majuro road built by US Navy

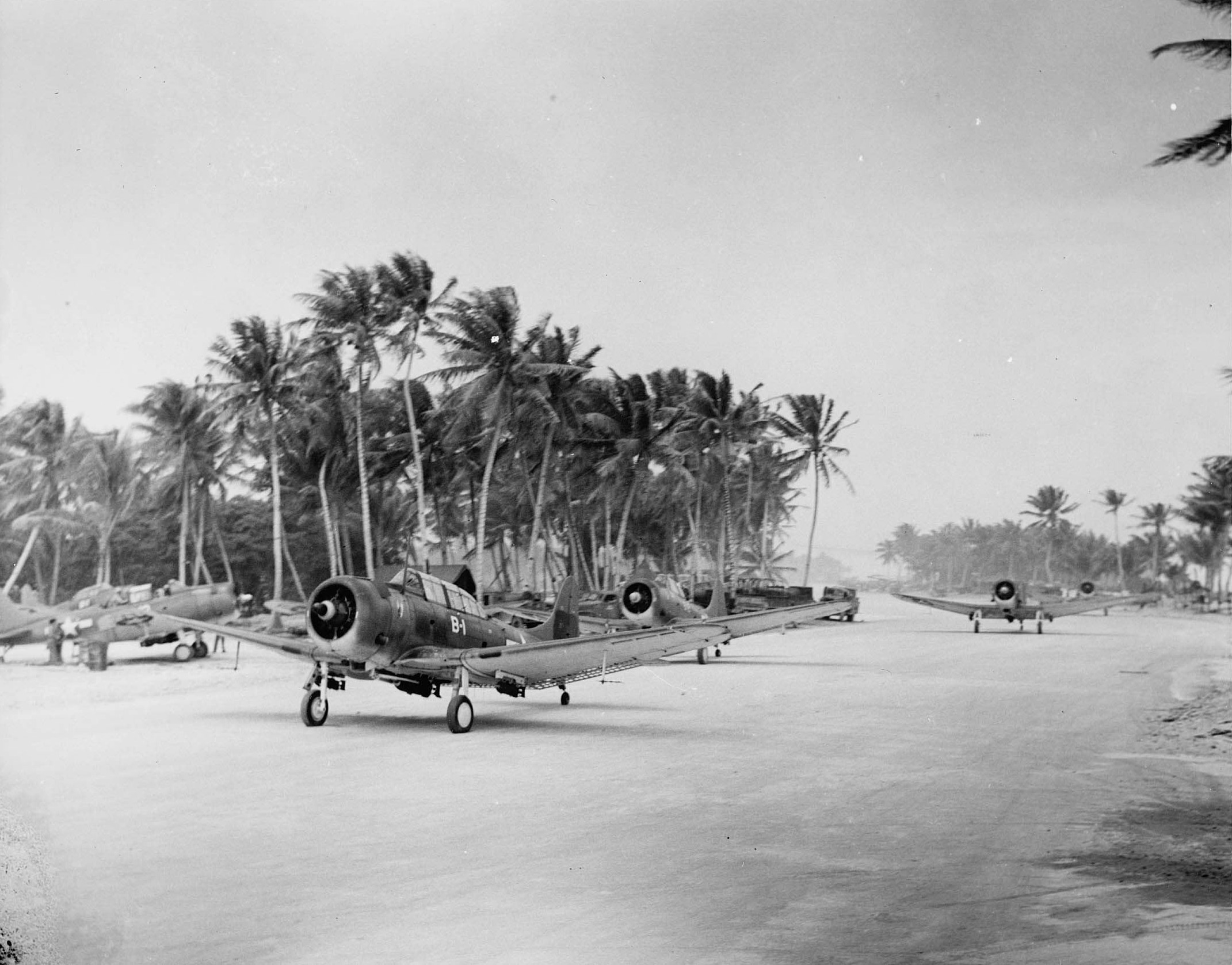
SBD Dauntless with VMSB-231 at Majuro in 1944

== See also ==
- List of islands of the Marshall Islands
- Type 4 Ka-Tsu
- US Naval Advance Bases
- World War II United States Merchant Navy
