= Laura, Marshall Islands =

Town in the Marshall Islands

Coordinates: 7°08′16″N 171°02′56″E

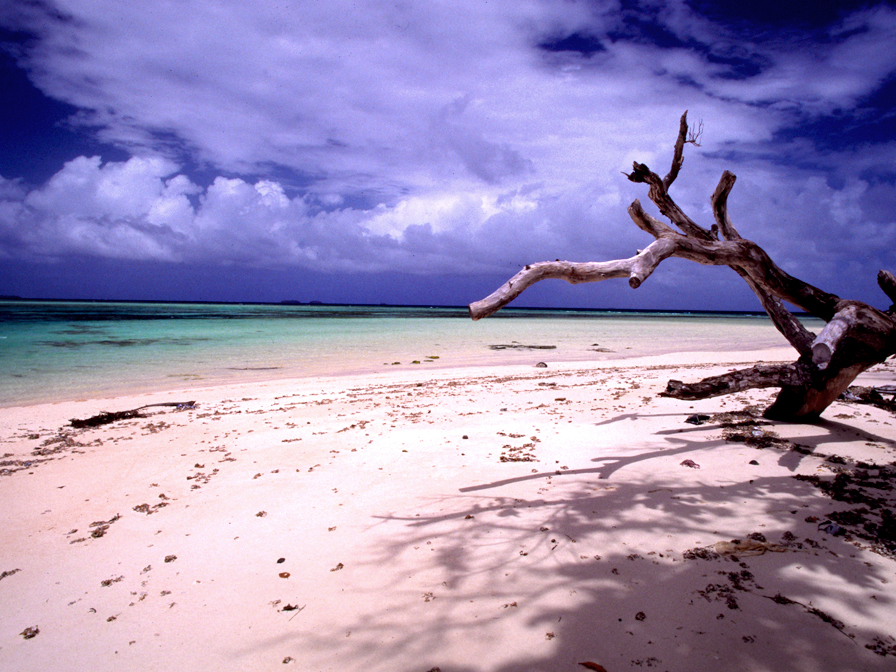
Beach scenery

Laura (Marshallese: Ļora, [lˠɔːrˠɑ]) is an island town situated in Marshall Islands. It is located in the west of Majuro Atoll. At approximately 10 feet (3.0 m) above sea level, Laura has the highest elevation of any islands in the Majuro Atoll. Marshall Islands International Airport is located on the island of Laura. A road connects the island of Laura to Djarrit. Much of the Majuro Atoll population relies on the freshwater lens in Laura to supply water.

On January 30, 1944, United States troops invaded and built a large base, Naval Base Majuro.

The town is falsely rumored to have been named after Lauren Bacall.

Laura has been identified as an ideal site for coral conservation, according to a study by the Woods Hole Oceanographic Institution and Stanford University, due to its coral's tolerance to high temperatures.

== History ==
=== Early history ===
Archeological excavations in the Laura Islet have shown that humans first inhabited Laura approximately 2,000 years ago, as the sea level declined. Continued drops in sea level led to more land revealed, causing inhabitants to spread further throughout the Laura area. Scholars estimated that most of landscape seen today was formed approximately 1,000 years ago.

== Climate ==
Climate data for Laura
Month	Jan	Feb	Mar	Apr	May	Jun	Jul	Aug	Sep	Oct	Nov	Dec	Year
Mean daily maximum °C (°F)	29 (84)	29.2 (84.6)	29.9 (85.8)	29 (85)	29.9 (85.8)	29.9 (85.8)	30.1 (86.1)	29.7 (85.5)	29.4 (84.9)	29.2 (84.5)	29.2 (84.6)	29.6 (85.2)	29.6 (85.2)
Mean daily minimum °C (°F)	24.5 (76.1)	24.3 (75.7)	24.8 (76.6)	24.8 (76.7)	24.7 (76.4)	24.2 (75.5)	24.1 (75.3)	24.1 (75.3)	24.2 (75.5)	23.9 (75.1)	24.3 (75.8)	24.3 (75.8)	24.3 (75.8)
Average precipitation mm (inches)	210 (8.2)	140 (5.7)	170 (6.7)	210 (8.4)	280 (11)	230 (8.9)	300 (11.9)	260 (10.2)	290 (11.4)	320 (12.6)	300 (11.8)	230 (9.2)	2,940 (115.9)
Source: Weatherbase

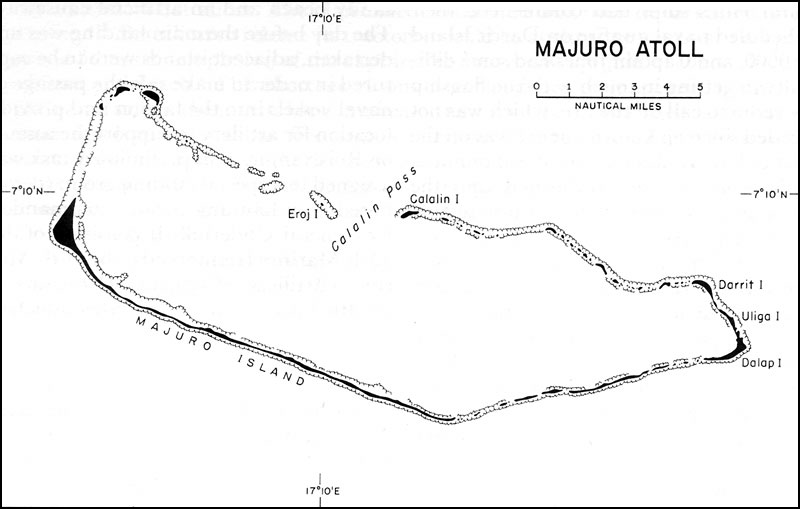
Majuro Atoll map
