= Majuro Airfield =

- Delap, Marshall Islands
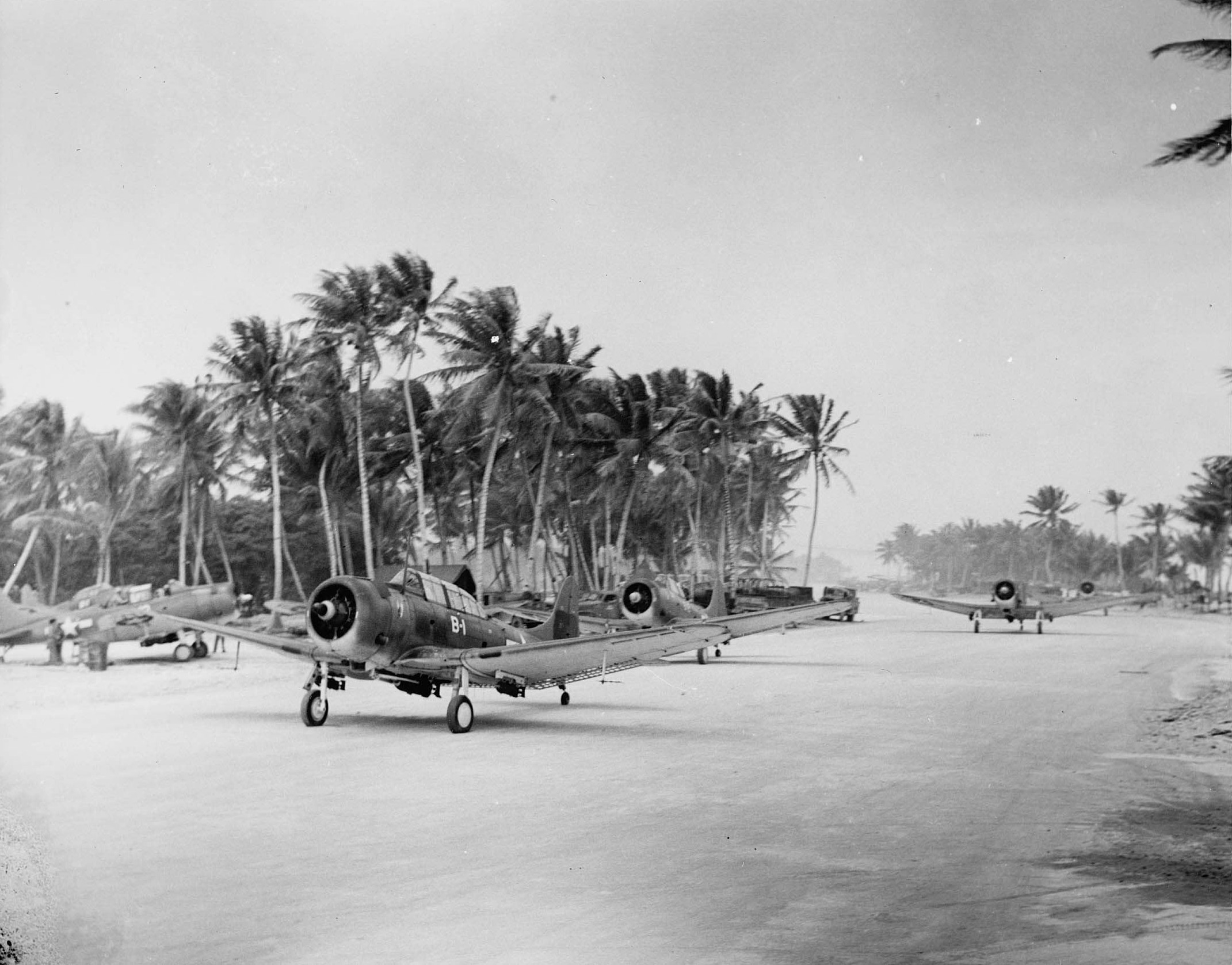
- SBDs of VMSB-231 taxiing on Majuro Airfield in 1944

Site information
- Type: Military Airfield
- Controlled by: United States Navy
- Condition: abandoned

Location
- Coordinates: 7°05′25″N 171°22′53″E

Site history
- Built: 1942
- Built by: Imperial Japanese Navy Air Service/Seabees
- In use: 1942-72
- Materials: Coral

Majuro Airfield or Naval Air Facility Majuro (NAF Majuro) is a former World War II airfield on the island of Delap in the Marshall Islands. The facility was supported by a large base, Naval Base Majuro.

== History ==
=== World War II ===
Majuro Airfield was originally established by the Imperial Japanese Navy Air Service in 1942. The island was captured on 31 January 1944 during Battle of Kwajalein by the V Amphibious Corps' Marine Reconnaissance Company and the 2nd Battalion, 106th Infantry Regiment who found it to be unoccupied. The 100th Naval Construction Battalion began to improve the airfield creating a coral-surfaced 5,800 feet (1,800 m) by 445 feet (136 m) runway covering most of Delap Island. By mid-March the airfield was in limited operation and by 15 April the airfield, taxiways, aprons, housing, shops, and piers were fully operational. The Seabees also constructed roads and causeways linking Delap to the adjacent islands. The carrier replacement plane pool was subsequently located at Majuro and a new 4,000 feet (1,200 m) by 175 feet (53 m) runway was built on Uliga Island and a two-lane causeway connecting Uliga and Delap was constructed. An 800 feet (240 m) by 150 feet (46 m) apron was cleared and paved adjacent to the main runway to facilitate transport operations.

Fourth Marine Air Wing headquarters and Marine Air Group 13 (MAG-13) relocated to Majuro Atoll in mid-March 1944. Units stationed at Majuro included VF-39 operating the F6F Hellcat, VMF-155 and VMF-224 operating F4Us and VMSB-231 operating SBDs.

B-25s of the 41st Bombardment Group operating out of Bairiki (Mullinix) Airfield, Tarawa, staged through Majuro for bombing raids on Maloelap, Wotje Mili Atoll and Jaluit during March and April 1944.

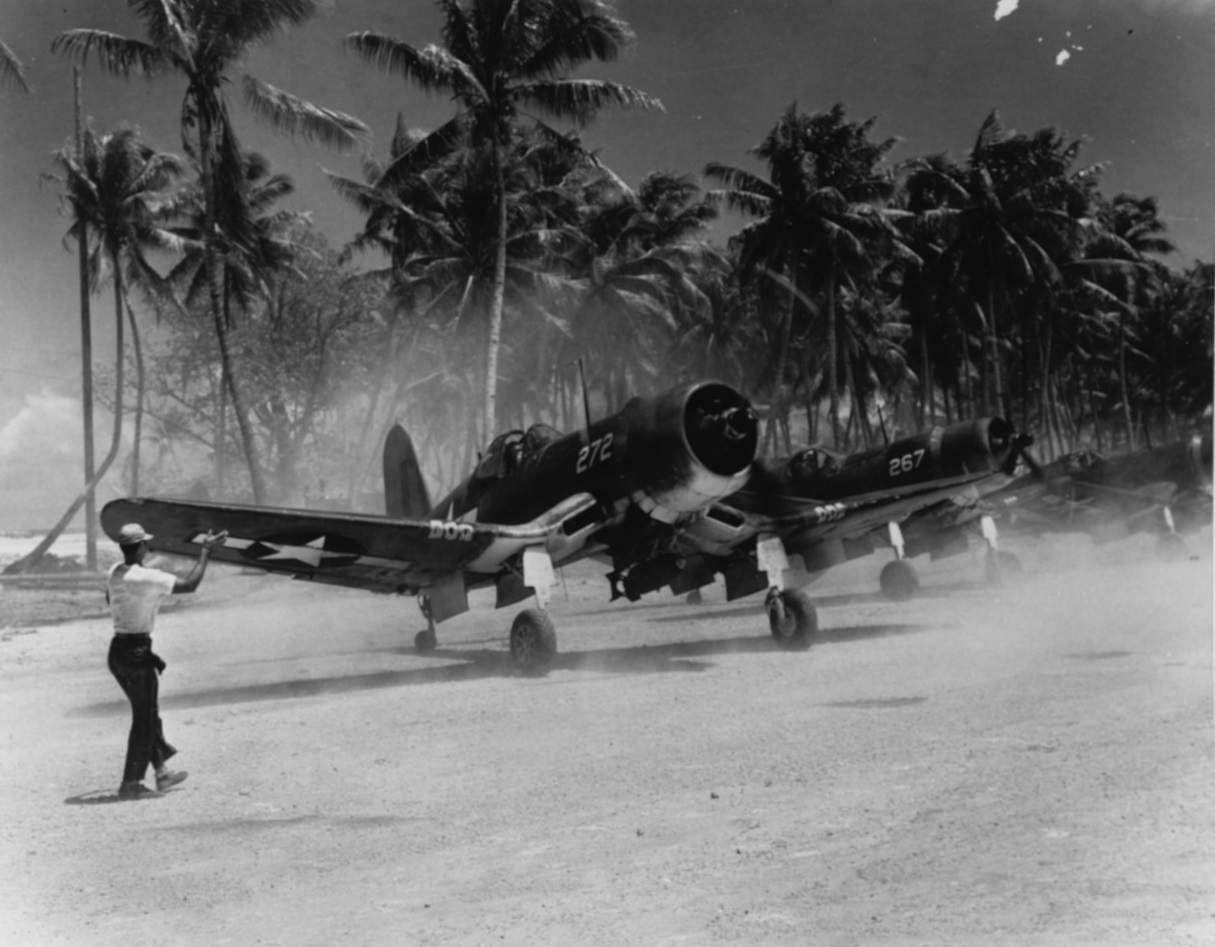
Vought F4U-1A/D Corsair fighters warming up at Majuro

=== Postwar ===
The airfield was reduced to inactive status on 1 January 1947 and disestablished on 1 June 1947.

In the postwar period the airfield continued to serve as the airport for Majuro, however by the mid-1960s the runway surface was deteriorating and it was becoming unsuitable for use by modern aircraft, so it was decided to relocate the airport to its current location west of Rairok and to utilize the area on Delap for industrial, commercial and residential development. Marshall Islands International Airport opened in 1972 and Majuro Airfield ceased operation.
