= Delap =

Island in Marshall Islands

Coordinates: 7°05′25″N 171°22′53″E

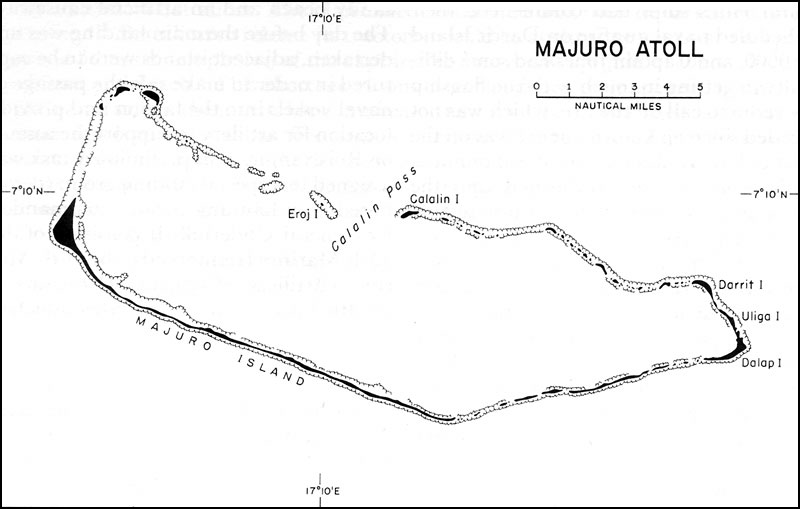
Majuro Atoll map

Delap (also called Dalap; Marshallese: Teļap, [tˠɛːlˠɑpʲ]) is an island district in the Marshall Islands. It is located in the east of Majuro Atoll. Along with Uliga and Djarrit it forms what is known as the "Delap-Uliga-Djarrit".

During World War II was the site of a large base, Naval Base Majuro.

== See also ==
- Delap SDA School
- Majuro Airfield
