= Majuro =

Capital of the Marshall Islands

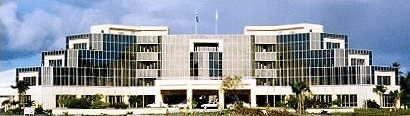
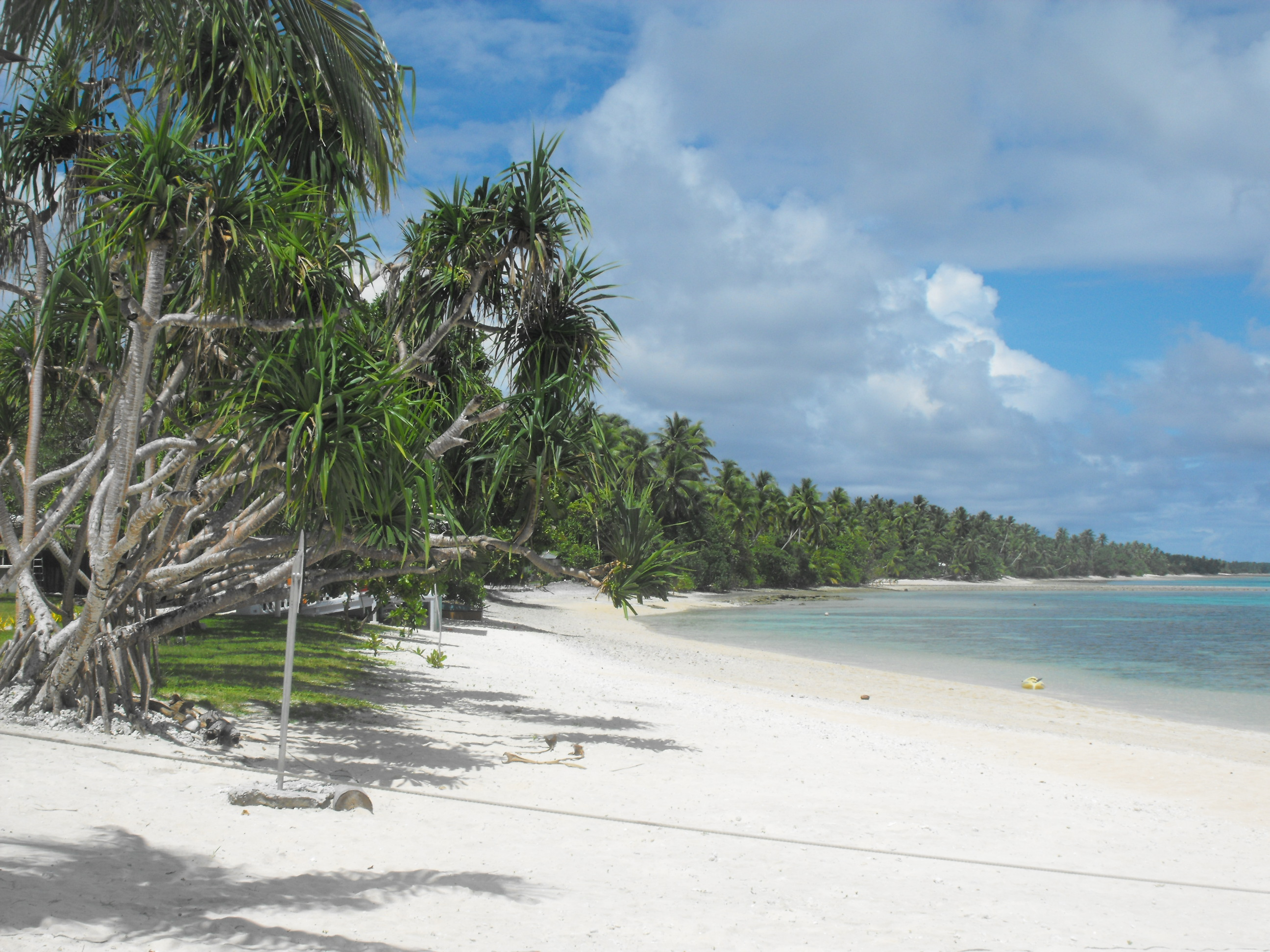
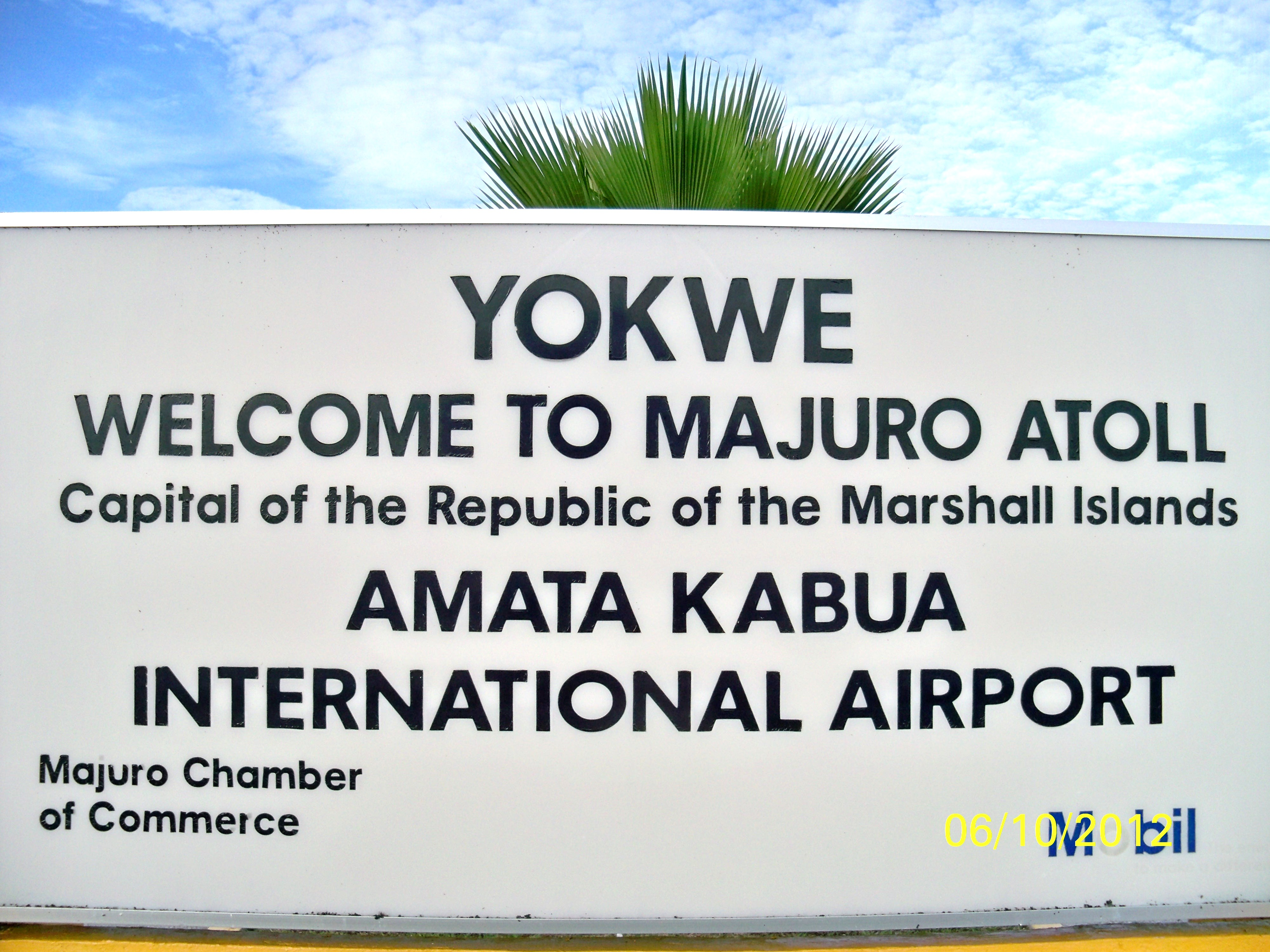
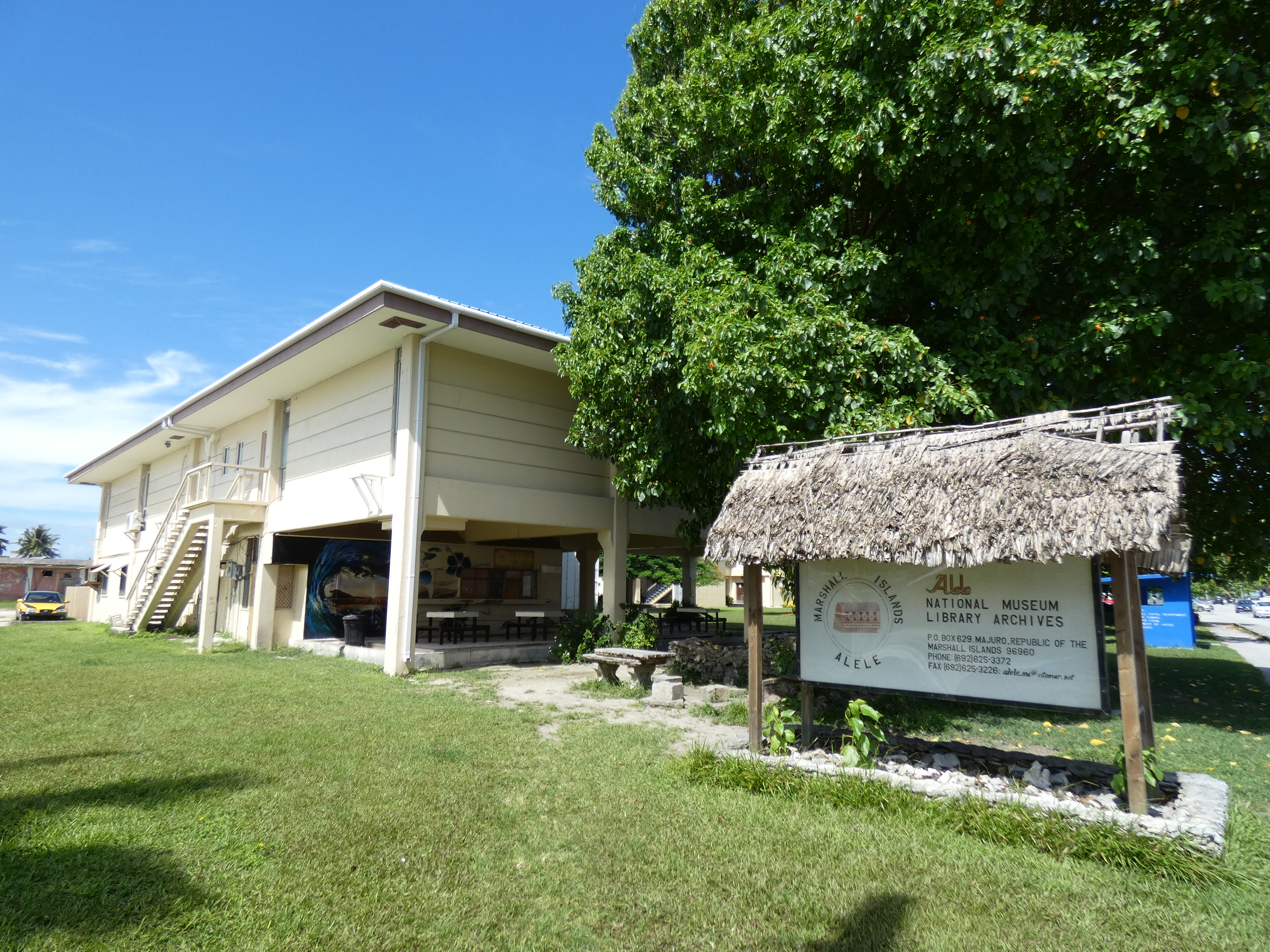
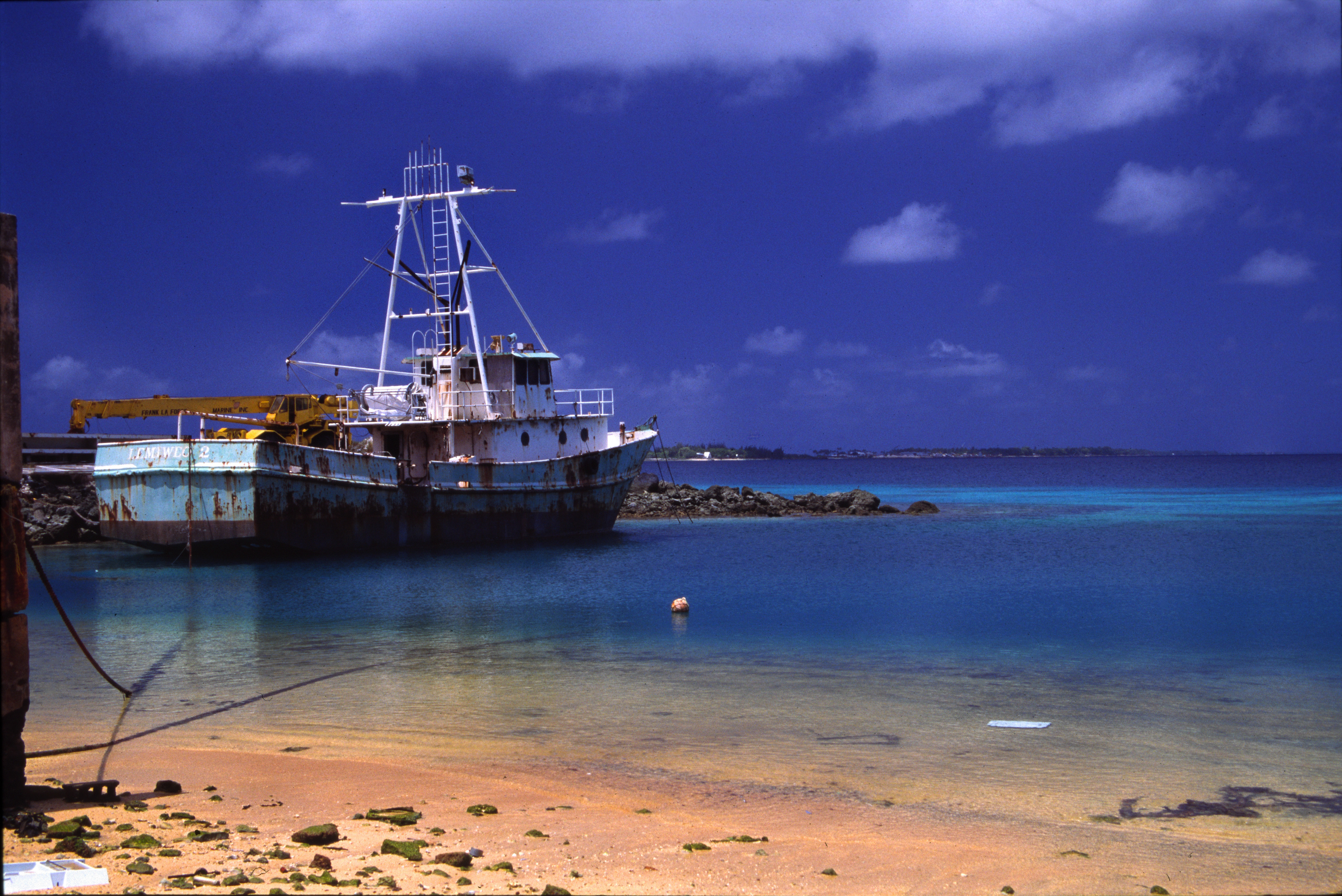
- Top: Marshall Islands Capitol Building; Middle: Enek Island, Amata Kabua International Airport; Bottom: Alele Museum, Majuro coastline

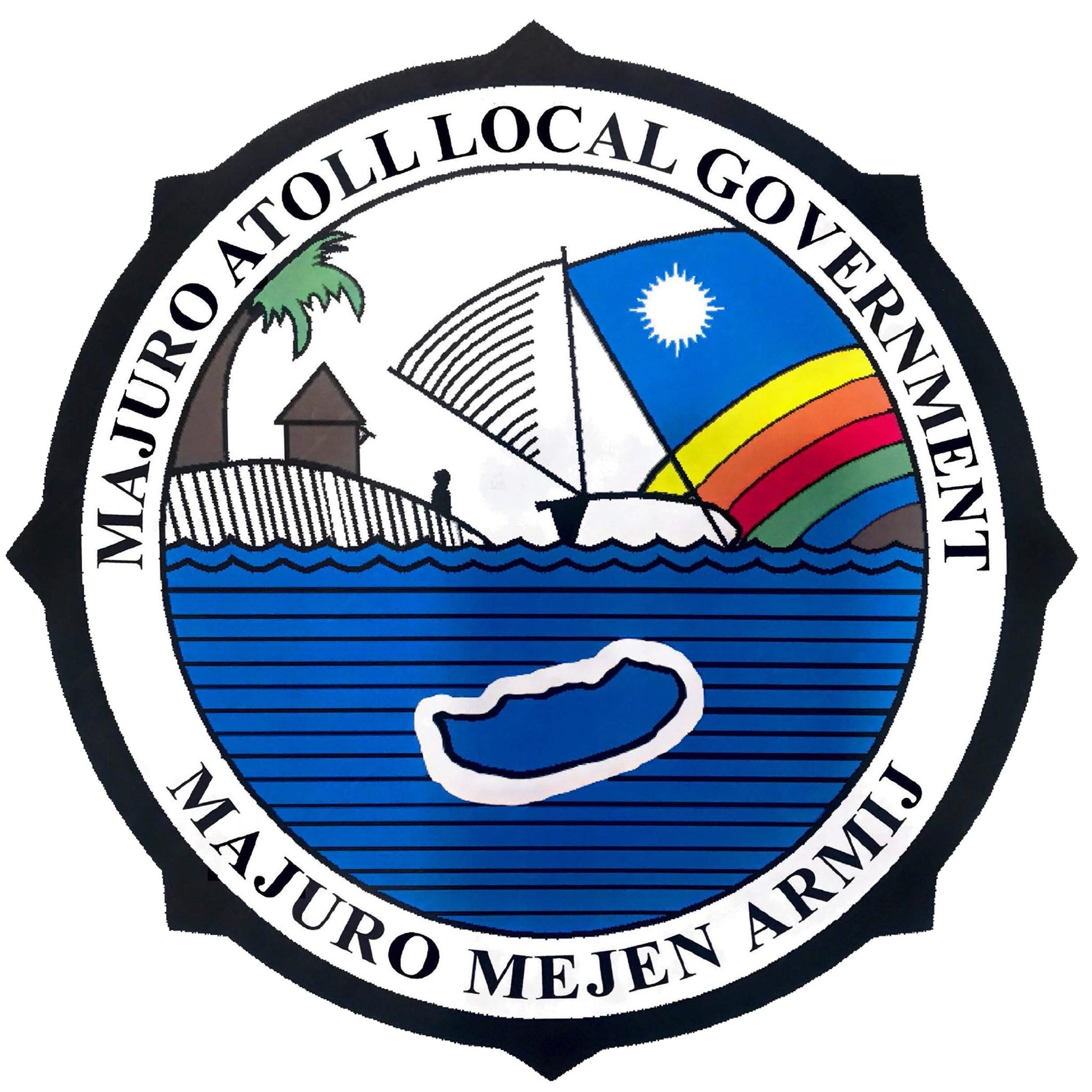
- Flag Seal

- Location of Majuro in Marshall Islands Majuro (Oceania)
- Coordinates: 7°05′N 171°23′E
- Country: Marshall Islands
- Island Chain: Ratak Chain

Government
  - Mayor: Ladie Jack

Area
  - Total: 9.7 km^{2} (3.7 sq mi)

Population (2021)
  - Total: 23,156
  - Density: 921.7/km^{2} (2,387.2/sq mi)
- Time zone: UTC+12 (MHT)
- Native languages: Marshallese

Majuro (Note: /ˈmædʒəroʊ/ MAJ-ər-oh; Marshallese: Mājro [mʲæzʲ(e)rˠo]) is the capital and largest city of the Marshall Islands. It is also a large coral atoll of 64 islands in the Pacific Ocean. It forms a legislative district of the Ratak (Sunrise) Chain of the Marshall Islands. The atoll has a land area of 9.7 square kilometers (3.7 sq mi) and encloses a lagoon of 295 square kilometers (114 sq mi). As with other atolls in the Marshall Islands, Majuro consists of narrow land masses. It has a tropical trade wind climate, with an average temperature of 27 °C (81 °F).

Majuro has been inhabited by humans for at least 2,000 years and was first settled by the Austronesian ancestors of the modern day Marshallese people. Majuro was the site of a Protestant mission and several copra trading stations in the 1870s, before the German Empire annexed the atoll as part of the German Protectorate of the Marshall Islands in 1885. The city was later under Japanese and American administration. After the Marshall Islands broke away from the Federated States of Micronesia in 1978 to form the Republic of the Marshall Islands, Majuro became the new country's capital and meeting place of the Nitijeļā, supplanting the former capital of Jaluit.

The main population center, Delap-Uliga-Djarrit (DUD), is made up of three contiguous motus and had a population of 23,156 people at the 2021 census. Majuro has a port, shopping district, and various hotels. Majuro has an international airport with scheduled international flights to Hawaii, the Federated States of Micronesia, Kiribati, Guam, Nauru, and flights to domestic destinations around the country. Its economy is primarily service sector-dominated.

== Geography ==
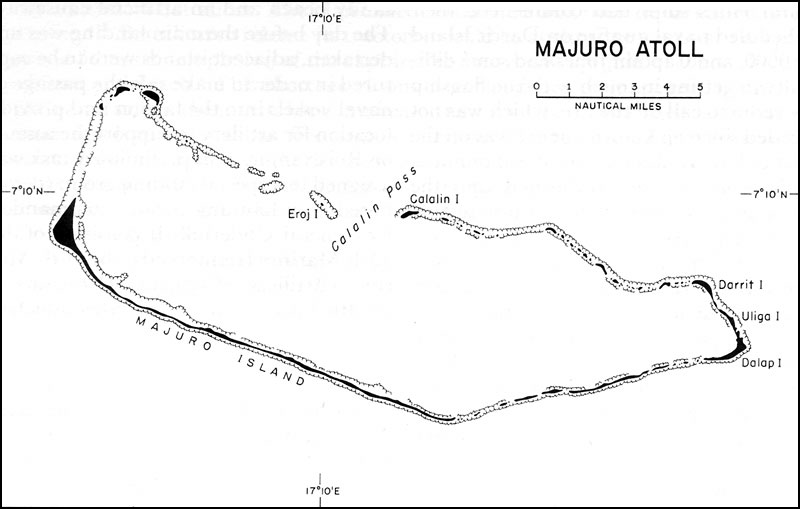
Schematic overview of Majuro

Majuro Atoll consists of over 60 islands, three of which are larger than 0.5 km^{2} (0.2 mi^{2}). At the western end of the atoll, about 50 kilometers (30 mi) from Delap-Uliga-Djarrit (DUD) by road, is the island community of Laura, an expanding residential area with a popular beach. Laura has the highest elevation point on the atoll, estimated at less than 3 meters (10 feet) above sea level. Djarrit is mostly residential.

=== Climate ===
Being slightly north of the Equator, Majuro has a tropical rainforest climate (Af) but not an equatorial climate because trade winds are prevailing throughout the year though they are frequently interrupted during the summer months by the movement of the Intertropical Convergence Zone across the area. Typhoons are rare. Temperatures are extremely consistent throughout the course of the year with average temperatures around 27 °C (81 °F). The hottest month is only 0.4 degree Celsius hotter than the coldest month. Very rarely does the temperature fall below 21 °C (70 °F). Majuro sees roughly 3,200 millimeters (126 in) of precipitation annually, with fall (Sep - Nov) being both the hottest and the rainiest season.

Climate data for Majuro (Marshall Islands International Airport) 1991–2020 normals, extremes 1955–present
Month	Jan	Feb	Mar	Apr	May	Jun	Jul	Aug	Sep	Oct	Nov	Dec	Year
Record high °F (°C)	92 (33)	91 (33)	90 (32)	90 (32)	90 (32)	92 (33)	96 (36)	94 (34)	90 (32)	93 (34)	93 (34)	91 (33)	96 (36)
Mean maximum °F (°C)	87.7 (30.9)	88.0 (31.1)	88.1 (31.2)	88.0 (31.1)	88.5 (31.4)	88.5 (31.4)	88.8 (31.6)	88.8 (31.6)	89.1 (31.7)	89.2 (31.8)	89.0 (31.7)	88.2 (31.2)	90.0 (32.2)
Mean daily maximum °F (°C)	85.7 (29.8)	85.9 (29.9)	86.0 (30.0)	86.1 (30.1)	86.3 (30.2)	86.3 (30.2)	86.6 (30.3)	86.7 (30.4)	86.9 (30.5)	86.8 (30.4)	86.0 (30.0)	86.5 (30.3)	86.3 (30.2)
Daily mean °F (°C)	81.9 (27.7)	82.0 (27.8)	82.2 (27.9)	82.2 (27.9)	82.4 (28.0)	82.2 (27.9)	82.4 (28.0)	82.5 (28.1)	82.6 (28.1)	82.5 (28.1)	82.3 (27.9)	82.2 (27.9)	82.3 (27.9)
Mean daily minimum °F (°C)	78.1 (25.6)	78.0 (25.6)	78.3 (25.7)	78.3 (25.7)	78.4 (25.8)	78.1 (25.6)	78.2 (25.7)	78.3 (25.7)	78.3 (25.7)	78.2 (25.7)	78.1 (25.6)	78.3 (25.7)	78.2 (25.7)
Mean minimum °F (°C)	74.9 (23.8)	74.5 (23.6)	74.8 (23.8)	74.9 (23.8)	75.0 (23.9)	75.0 (23.9)	74.9 (23.8)	74.8 (23.8)	74.6 (23.7)	74.6 (23.7)	74.4 (23.6)	74.8 (23.8)	72.6 (22.6)
Record low °F (°C)	69 (21)	70 (21)	70 (21)	70 (21)	70 (21)	70 (21)	70 (21)	71 (22)	70 (21)	70 (21)	68 (20)	70 (21)	68 (20)
Average precipitation inches (mm)	8.24 (209)	7.62 (194)	8.65 (220)	11.12 (282)	10.71 (272)	11.10 (282)	10.96 (278)	11.18 (284)	12.60 (320)	13.79 (350)	13.41 (341)	11.88 (302)	131.26 (3,334)
Average precipitation days (≥ 0.01 in)	19.6	16.7	18.1	19.3	23.0	22.9	24.1	22.6	22.6	23.9	23.2	22.6	258.6
Average relative humidity (%)	77.7	77.1	79.0	80.7	81.9	81.1	80.5	79.3	79.4	79.4	79.9	79.7	79.6
Average dew point °F (°C)	73.2 (22.9)	73.4 (23.0)	74.1 (23.4)	74.7 (23.7)	75.6 (24.2)	75.0 (23.9)	74.8 (23.8)	74.7 (23.7)	74.7 (23.7)	74.7 (23.7)	74.8 (23.8)	74.5 (23.6)	74.5 (23.6)
Mean monthly sunshine hours	224.4	218.6	252.8	219.4	224.8	210.8	217.0	232.2	217.8	205.4	191.4	197.4	2,612
Percentage possible sunshine	61	66	67	60	58	56	56	61	60	55	54	54	59
Source: NOAA (relative humidity, dew points and sun 1961–1990)

== History ==
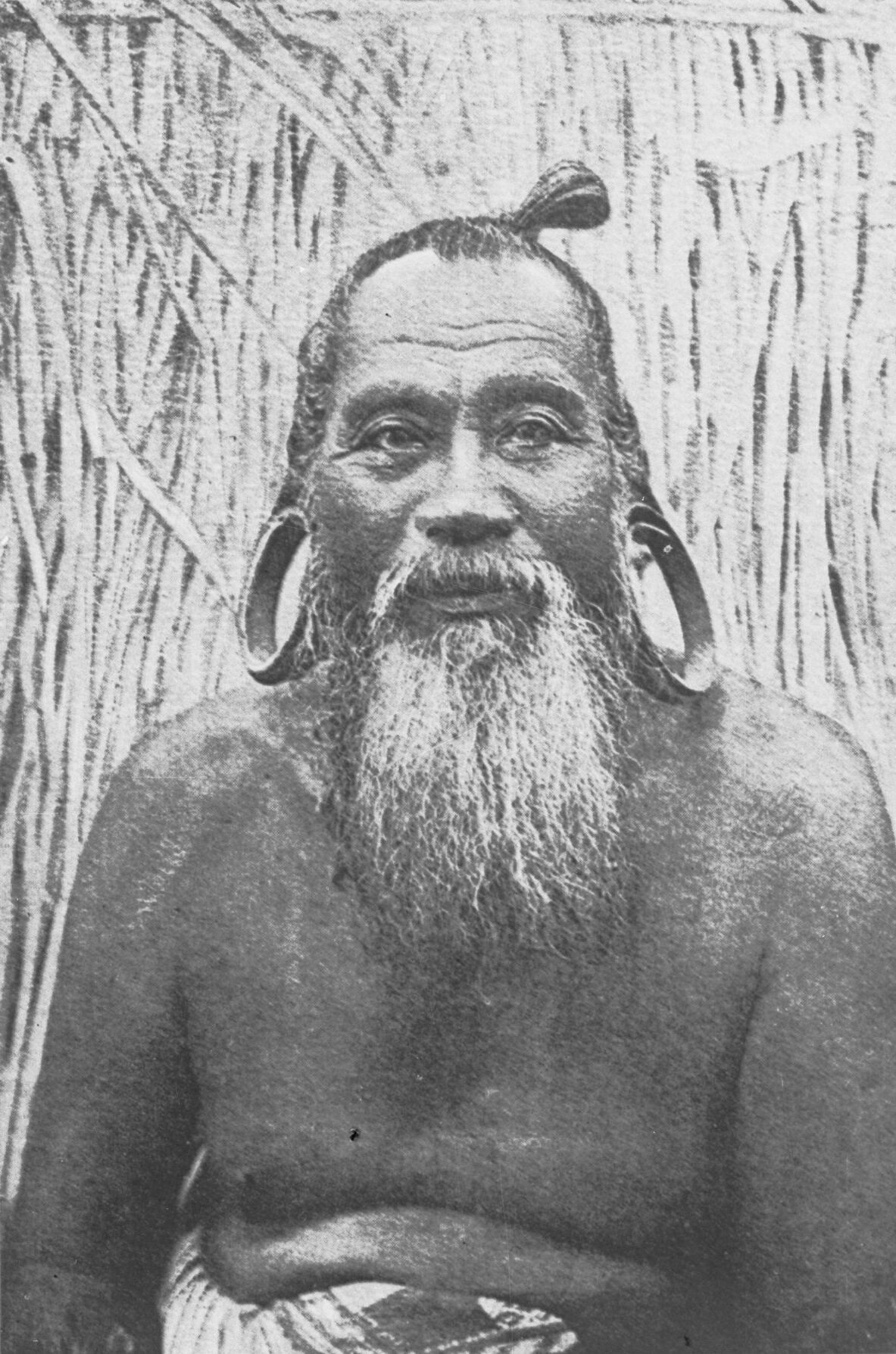
Iroij Jebrik

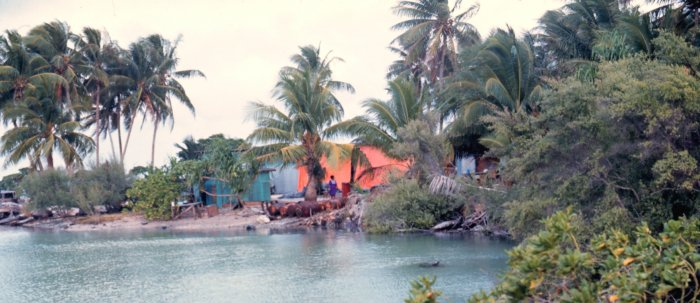
Lagoon side with native dwellings

The atoll has been inhabited for at least 2,000 years by Austronesian peoples, including the ancestors of modern-day Marshallese residents. Archaeological excavations of um earth ovens at the Laura village on Majuro suggest habitation around the 1st century AD with a radiocarbon dating range of 93 BC to 127 AD.

Protestant missionaries of the American Board of Commissioners for Foreign Missions established a church and school on atoll in 1869. By 1876, agents of the firms Capelle & Co., Hernsheim & Co., and Thomas Farrell were engaged in the copra trade on Majuro. After buying out Thomas Farrell's interests in 1877, New Zealand-based copra firm Henderson & Macfarlane had its regional headquarters on Majuro.

Rival iroij Jebrik and Rimi fought waged war against each other for several years in the late 1870s and 1880s. Their uncle Lerok, the previous iroijlaplap of Majuro had wanted them to divide the atoll between them when he died, but Jebrik began a war for sole control. At least 10 islanders died in the conflict; the destruction of trees and crops caused a serious food shortage; and a slowdown in copra production caused Jebrik to take on debt for his war effort. In 1883, Cyprian Bridge of the passing British warship HMS Espiegle mediated a peace treaty. The fighting never resumed, but when HMS Dart passed Majuro in 1884, Rimi was trying to persuade the iroij of Aur Atoll to join him in an attack on Jebrik. The British commander mediated peace and warned the iroij of Aur to stay out of the conflict. The commander of the Dart threatened to fine copra traders who had been selling weapons to the islanders, but some traders continued selling weapons in spite of the prohibition, and the residents of Majuro refused to give up their firearms after the war between Jebrik and Rimi ended, because they feared invasion by neighboring islanders.

The German Empire claimed Majuro Atoll as part of the German Protectorate of the Marshall Islands in 1885. As with the rest of the Marshalls, Majuro was captured by the Imperial Japanese Navy in 1914 during World War I and mandated to the Empire of Japan by the League of Nations in 1920. The island then became a part of the Japanese mandated territory of the South Seas Mandate; although the Japanese had established a government in the Mandate, local affairs were mostly left in the hands of traditional local leaders until the start of World War II.

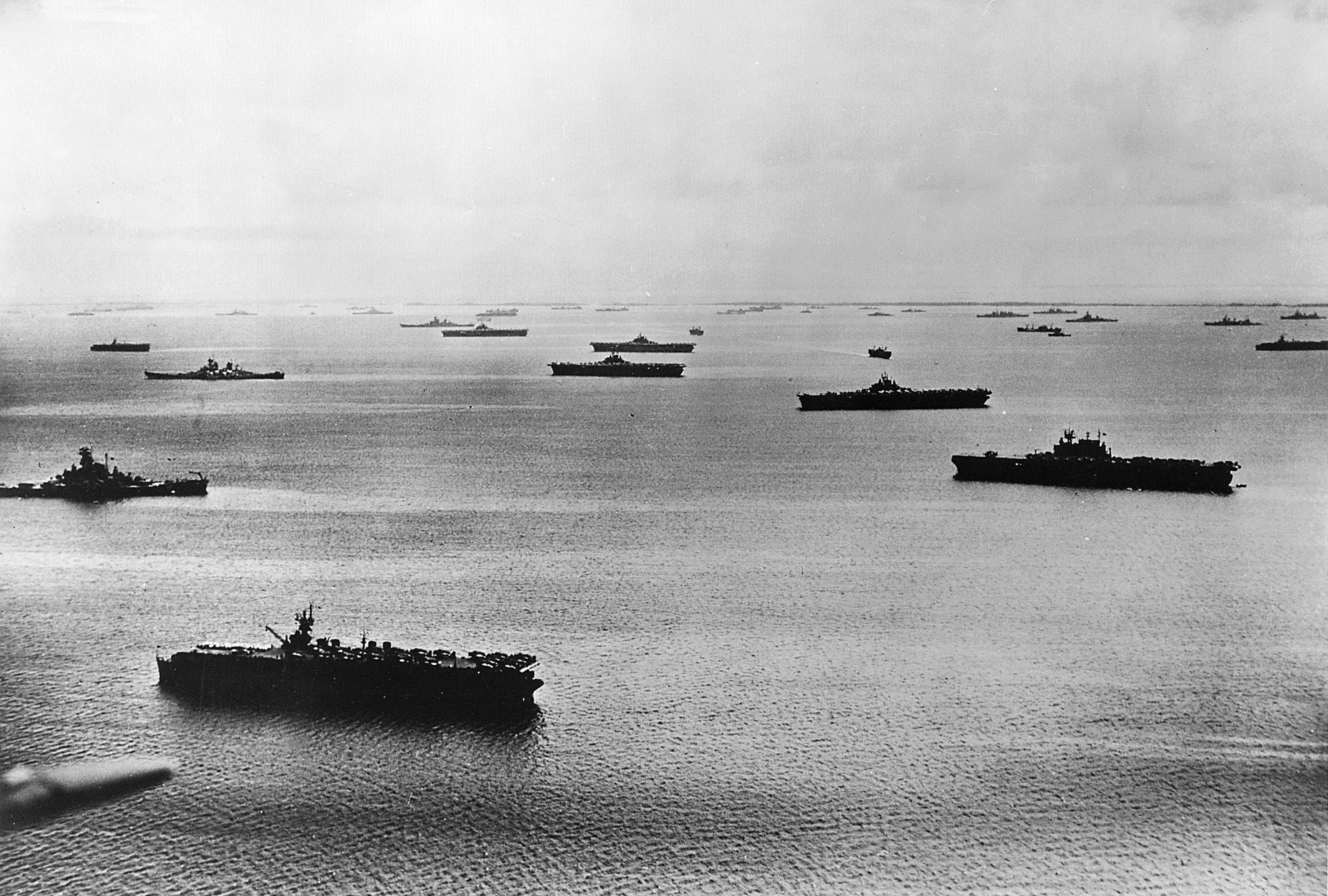
The Fifth Fleet at anchor at Majuro, 1944

On January 30, 1944, United States Armed Forces invaded, but found that Japanese forces had evacuated their fortifications to Kwajalein and Enewetak about a year earlier. A single Japanese warrant officer had been left as a caretaker. With his capture, the islands were secured. This gave the U.S. Navy use of one of the largest anchorages in the Central Pacific. The lagoon became a large forward naval base, Naval Base Majuro, and was the largest and most active port in the world until the war moved westward when it was supplanted by Ulithi (Yap, Federated States of Micronesia).

Following World War II, Majuro came under the control of the United States as part of the Trust Territory of the Pacific Islands. After the Marshall Islands broke away from the Federated States of Micronesia in 1978 to form the Republic of the Marshall Islands, Majuro became the new country's capital and meeting place of the Nitijeļā, the legislature of the Marshall Islands. It supplanted Jaluit Atoll as the administrative center of the Marshall Islands, a status that it retains after the independence of the Marshall Islands in 1986 under a Compact of Free Association.

The island was also the site of the Majuro Declaration, a declaration by the Pacific Islands Forum signed on September 5, 2013, to make a unified action on climate change adaptation and international aid.

== Demographics ==
The major population centers are the D–U–D communities: the islets of Delap–Uliga–Djarrit (listed from south to north, on the eastern edge of the atoll). Majuro had a population of 23,156 at the 2021 census.

=== Religion ===
Most of the population is Christian. The majority are Protestant and follow the United Church of Christ (47%), Assembly of God (16%) and others such as Bukot Nan Jesus (5%), Full Gospel (3%), Reformed Congressional Church (3%), the Salvation Army (2%), Seventh-Day Adventist (1%), and Meram in Jesus (1%). 8% of the population are Catholic, with the Cathedral of the Assumption of the Roman Catholic Apostolic Prefecture of the Marshall Islands located in Majuro.

Islamic influence has been increasing. There are a sizable number of Ahmadi Muslims. The first mosque opened in Majuro in September 2012.

There are also LDS churches, Baptist churches, and Jehovah's Witnesses.

=== Ethnic composition ===
Ethnicity	Number (2021)	Percentage
Marshallese	21,359	93.4%
Filipino	375	1.6%
I-Kiribati	278	1.2%
American	227	1.0%
Fijian	161	0.7%
Chinese	119	0.5%
Micronesian	79	0.4%
Tuvaluan	78	0.3%
Solomon Islander	40	0.2%
Japanese	30	0.1%
Other	127	0.6%
Total	22,873	100%

== Economy ==
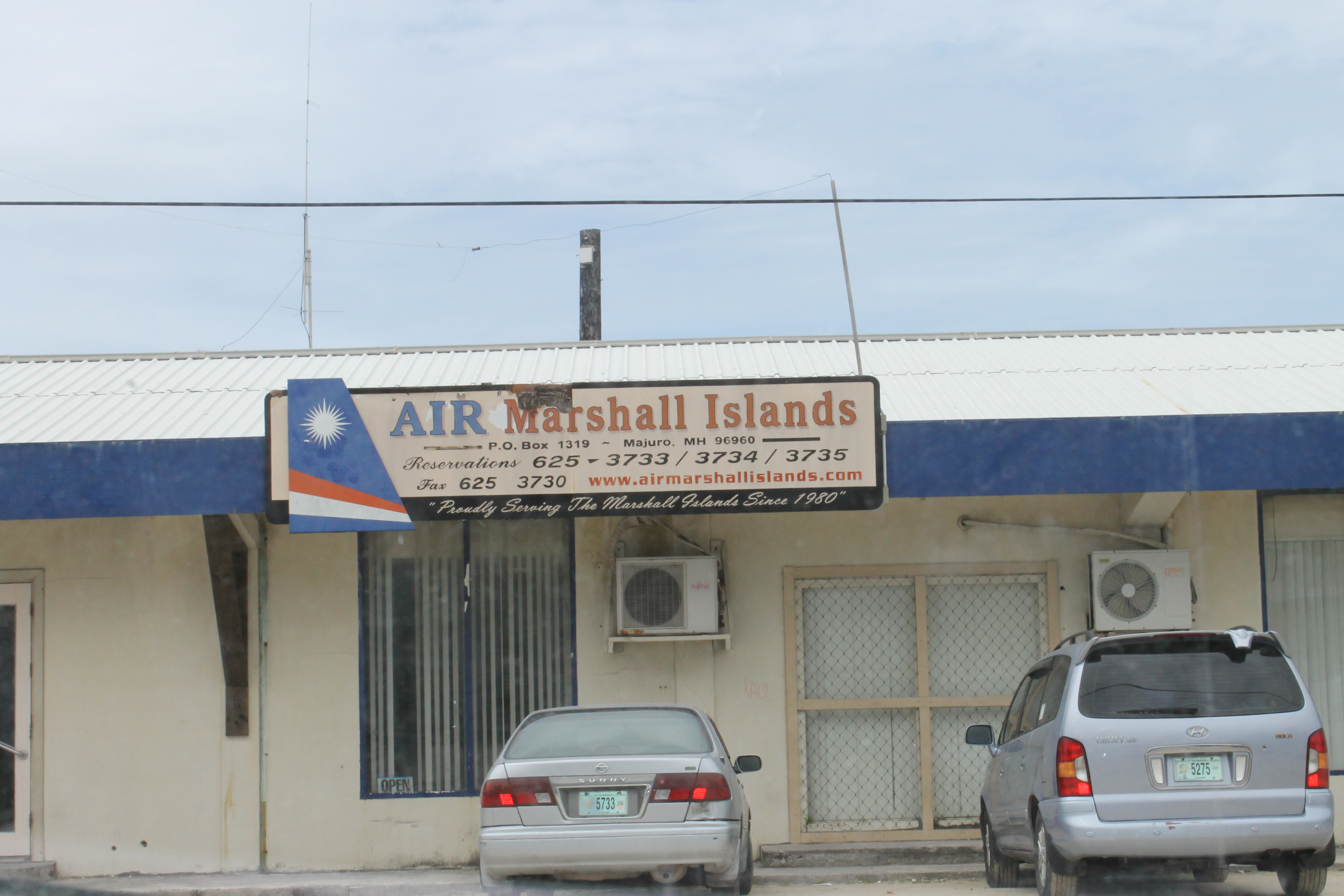
Air Marshall Islands Headquarters in Majuro

Majuro's economy is driven by the service sector, which composed 86% of the GDP in 2011.

On September 15, 2007, Witon Barry, of the Tobolar Copra processing plant in the Marshall Islands' capital of Majuro, said power authorities, private companies and entrepreneurs had been experimenting with coconut oil as an alternative to diesel fuel for vehicles, power generators, and ships. Coconut trees abound in the Pacific's tropical islands. Copra from 6 to 10 coconuts makes 1 litre of oil.

Air Marshall Islands has its headquarters in Majuro.

== Education ==
=== Colleges and universities ===
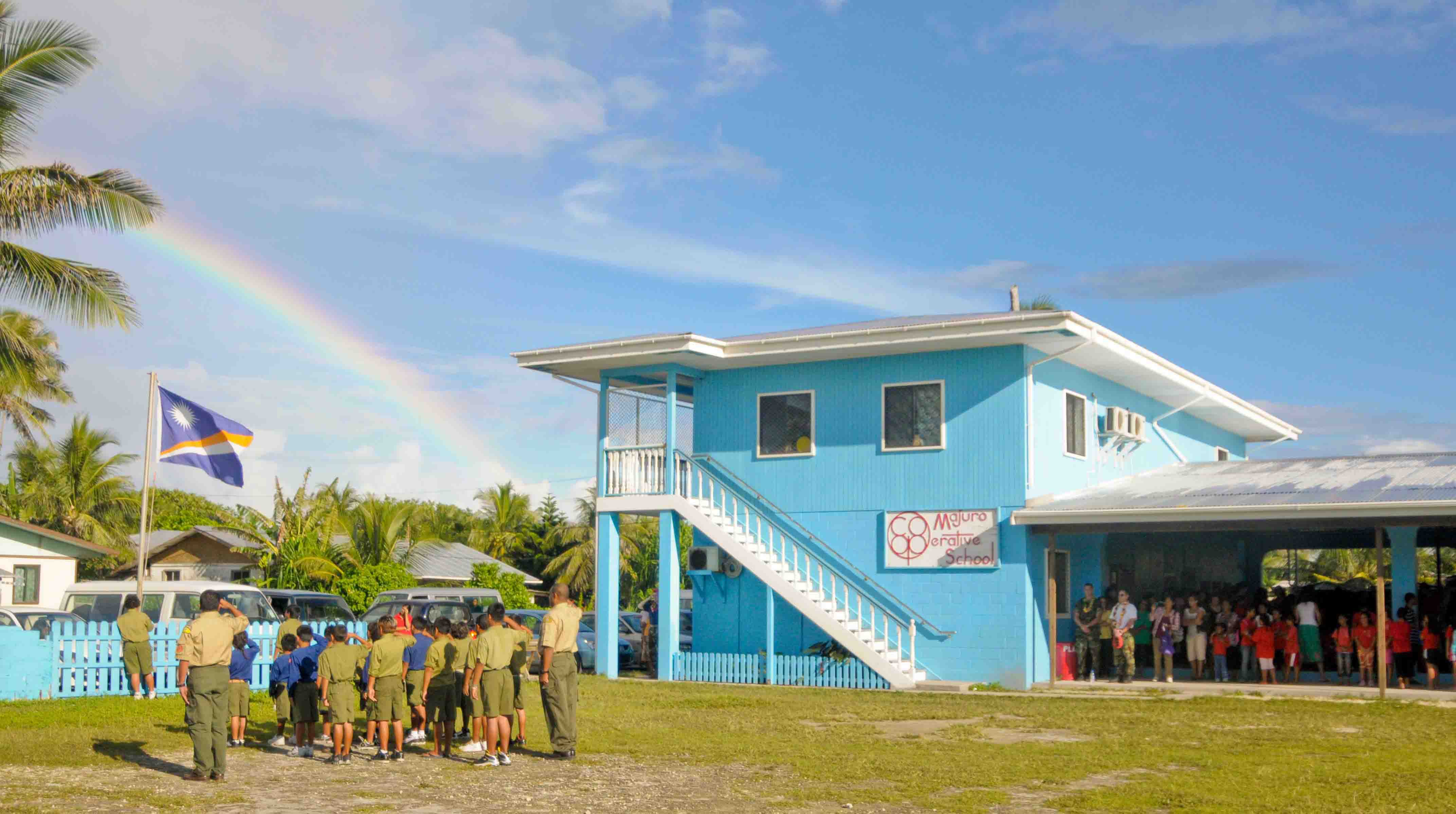
Students at the Majuro Cooperative School raise the Republic of the Marshall Islands flag at a ceremony during a Pacific Partnership 2009 community service project

The College of the Marshall Islands is located in Uliga. The University of South Pacific has a presence on Majuro.

=== Primary and secondary schools ===
Marshall Islands Public School System operates public schools.

High schools:

- The Marshall Islands High School is near the north end of Majuro.
- Laura High School
- Life Skills Academy

Primary schools:

- Ajeltake Elementary School
- Delap Elementary School
- DUD Kindergarten
- Ejit Elementary School
- Laura Elementary School
- Long Island Elementary School
- Majuro Middle School
- Rairok Elementary School
- Rita Elementary School
- Uliga Elementary School
- Woja Maj. Elementary School
- Carl Kuli Lobat. Elementary School

In the 1994–1995 school year Majuro had 10 private elementary schools and six private high schools.

There is a Seventh Day Adventist High School and Elementary School in Delap, where English is taught to all students.

== Health ==
The 101-bed Majuro Hospital (officially the Leroij Atama Zedkeia Medical Center) is the main hospital for Majuro, as well as many of the outer islands. The country's only other major hospital is on Ebeye Island, the Leroij Kitlang Memorial Health Center. As of 2015, most of the 43 physicians employed by the Marshall Islands were located at the Majuro Hospital. The Laura and Rongrong Health Centers are also located on the atoll of Majuro.

== Infrastructure ==
=== Water and sewage ===
The Majuro Water and Sewer Company (https://majurowater.com/) obtains water from a catchment basin on the International Airport runway. It supplies 140,000,000 US gallons (530 ML) a year or 14 US gallons (53 L) per person per day. This compares with New York City's 118 US gallons (450 L) per person per day. Water is supplied 12 hours daily. The threat of drought is commonplace.

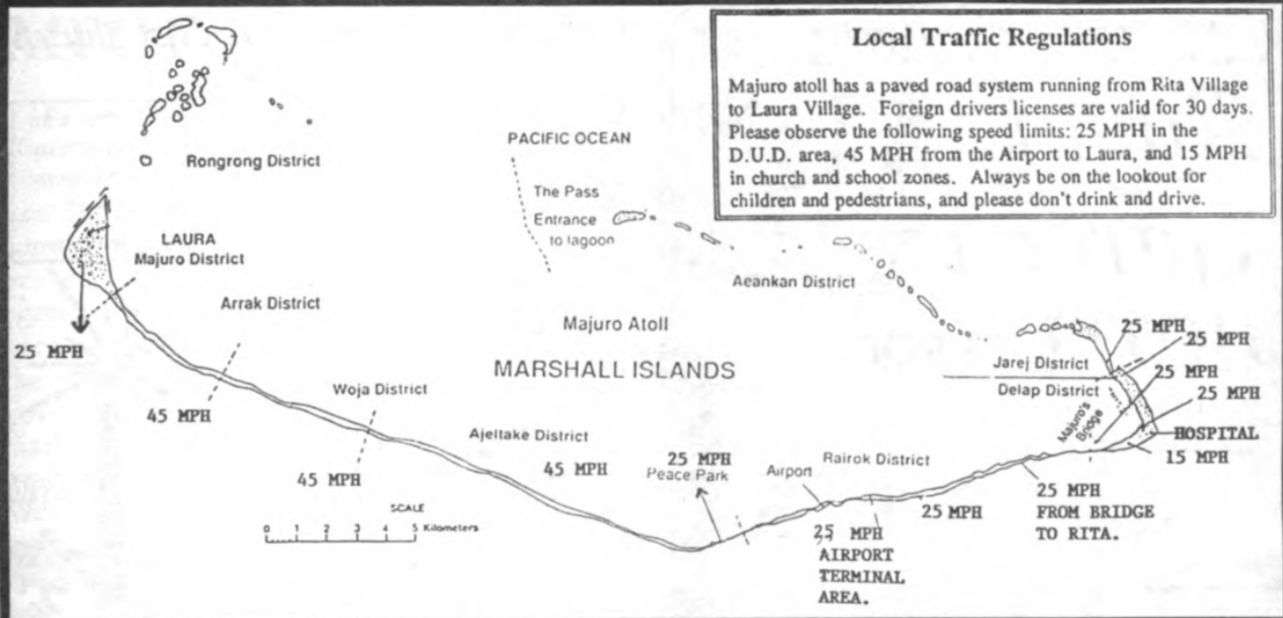
Road system on Majuro Atoll

=== Transport ===
==== Air ====
Marshall Islands International Airport, offering domestic and international services, is on Majuro. It is served by four passenger airlines: United Airlines, Nauru Airlines, Air Marshall Islands, and Asia Pacific Airlines.

Air Marshall Islands flies to most of the Marshalls' inhabited atolls once a week. It offers daily service between Majuro and Kwajalein, except Thursdays and Sundays.

==== Sea ====
Majuro Lagoon is an active port. It is one of the busiest tuna transshipment ports in the world, with 306,796 tons of tuna being moved from purse seine vessels to carrier vessels in 2018.

The Marshall Islands Shipping Corporation was established by the Marshall Islands via the Marshall Islands Shipping Corporation Act 2004. It manages several government ships that move people and freight around the islands. These ships include three older ships (Langidrik, Aemman, and Ribuuk Ae), as well as two newer ships (Majuro, Kwajalein) which were donated to the Republic of the Marshall Islands by Japan in 2013. They also operate a landing craft (Jelejeletae). These vessels are the main link for transporting people and supplies to and from the outer islands.

Additionally, the lagoon acts as a harbor for commercial fishing vessels, cruise ships, and luxury yachts.

== Sport ==
Majuro was initially scheduled to host the seventh edition of the Micronesian Games, in 2010. It subsequently renounced its hosting rights, citing a lack of adequate infrastructure. In 2018, the Marshall Islands were awarded the 2022 Micro Games, and a new stadium is being built in Majuro. (In 2021, it was decided to move back the Games a year, to 2023.) The new stadium is also expected to host soccer matches, which will be a first step in forming the Marshall Islands' first-ever national soccer team.

Weightlifter Mattie Langtor Sasser competed for the Marshall Islands in the 2016 Summer Olympics, participating in the Women's 58 kg category on August 8.

== Twin towns ==
Majuro is twinned with:

- Inalåhan, Guam, United States, since 1973
- Kawai, Nara, Japan
- Taipei, Republic of China (Taiwan), since 1999
- Basco, Philippines
- Luganville, Vanuatu
- Weno, Micronesia
- Tamuning, Guam, United States
- Tarawa, Kiribati
- Honiara, Solomon Islands
- Nukuʻalofa, Tonga
