= Beer in Bulgaria =

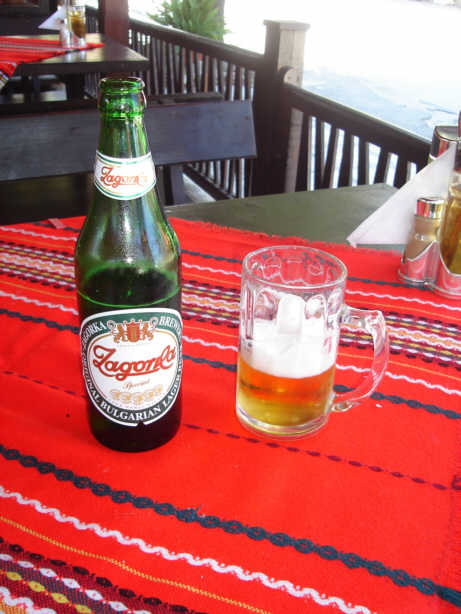
A bottle of Bulgarian beer in a meyhane

The modern history of beer in Bulgaria (Bulgarian: пиво, pivo or бира, bira) dates back to the 19th century, when it was introduced to the country by foreigners (from Austria-Hungary, France and Switzerland) shortly before the Liberation of Bulgaria. Until then, beer was practically unknown in what used to be a mainly rakia and wine-drinking country. Today, Bulgaria ranks 14th by beer consumption per capita, with 73 litres a year.

== History ==
The Hungarian exiles in Shumen, led by Lajos Kossuth after the Hungarian Revolution of 1848, brewed beer and are thought to have found followers among the locals. However, their stay in the city was short and they could not manage to introduce beer to the masses. The Frenchman Ducorp, who worked as a railway engineer near Sofia between 1873 and 1876, opened a small brewery in Knyazhevo. The Czech Jiří Prošek, who first came to Bulgaria in 1873 to work on the same railway line, noted that the local Shopi had the custom to brew primitive beer at harvest time. They soaked barley, leaving it to germinate, drying it, adding hot water and wild hops, with natural fermentation and cooling.

Bulgaria's earliest commercial brewery was established in Plovdiv by the German Swiss Rudolf Frick and Friedrich Sulzer in 1876. It became a large and modern factory in 1879–1881 with the help of another Swiss expert, Christian August Bomanti. Production began in 1882 in the Kamenitsa area near the city and continues today, its successor being the Kamenitza brewery. The first brewery in Varna dates back to 1884, when the contractors Kasabov and Vtichev opened up a small factory.

The professional Czech brewer Franz-František Milde established the Shumensko beer factory in Shumen in 1882, and helped found the Bulgarian Brewing Association the same year. Jiří Prošek and his brothers founded the Vitosha brewery in Sofia in 1884; they also bought Ducorp's small brewery and owned the Dalbok Zimnik cellar. Today, the Vitosha brewery is known as Ariana.

In 1899, Milde's Bulgarian partners tried to deceive him, so he bought the Austrian Johann Habermann's brewery in Rousse (established in 1876) and started producing beer there. Fearing his competition, his partners quickly paid their debts and Milde returned to Shumen, leaving his brother Sebastian as the Rousse factory's manager.

In the late 19th and early 20th century, beer rapidly grew in popularity among the Bulgarian middle class, and a large number of beer houses were established in most big cities. After World War I, there were already 18 breweries in Bulgaria. Besides those already mentioned, these included the Stara Zagora factory of Dr. Kozhuharov (since 1902), the Czechs Malotin and Hozman's factory in Lom, the Habermann and St Petka breweries in Rousse, the German Moritz Ratt's Cherven Rak factory in Pleven, W. Ollinger's in Koshava, others in Veliko Tarnovo and Gorna Oryahovitsa, etc.

Following World War II, as Bulgaria became part of the Eastern Bloc, all breweries were nationalized. Since the democratic reforms in 1989, the Bulgarian beer market has been dominated by some of the world's largest multinational beer companies who privatized the local breweries and produce both locally and internationally branded beer. Numerous beer festivals (birfest) are organized yearly in the major cities all around the country, for example in Sofia, Plovdiv, Pleven, Gabrovo, Sevlievo, Bansko, Vidin, etc.

The most popular form of packaging is the glass bottle, closely followed by the PET bottle, which, in 2008, accounted for 41% of beer packaging. Some Eastern European countries are showing a trend towards purchasing lager in large PET packs, for Bulgaria this trend is mainly confined to standard and economy brands of pale lager.

== Economy ==
The domestic beer market produces 582 million litres annually. Standard pale lager has been the traditional beer choice for Bulgarians, but with Heineken, Molson Coors and Carlsberg buying up local breweries, the choice for beer drinkers in the premium and economy segments has expanded. Beer imports and exports have started to diverge - exports climbed in 2007 to 8.4 million litres, compared to imports declining to 4.6 million litres. Bulgaria exports mainly to neighbouring countries, such as Macedonia, Romania or Serbia, and to countries where there is an expatriate population, such as the United States, Canada, United Kingdom and Spain.

== Breweries ==
There are thirteen breweries in Bulgaria, four of which are owned by Molson Coors, two by Carlsberg and two by Heineken. Local breweries include Bolyarka, which makes a range of lagers, and distributes the Warsteiner brand in Bulgaria.

=== Molson Coors brands ===
- Kamenitza
- Astika
- Burgasko

=== Heineken brands ===
- Zagorka
- Ariana
- Stolichno

=== Carlsberg brands ===
- Pirinsko Pivo
- Shumensko

In addition, international beer brands have a large market share and are, in many cases (e.g. Stella Artois, Beck's, Heineken, Staropramen, Tuborg, Amstel), brewed locally.

=== Other Bulgarian brands ===
- Ledenika
- Lomsko
- Boliarka
- Britos
- Sofia Electric Brewing

== Brands ==
Bulgaria, while being a relatively small country in Eastern Europe, has quite a number of beer brands. The most popular breweries (all producing namesake lagers) are Kamenitza (produced in the city of Plovdiv), Zagorka (produced mainly in Stara Zagora) and Astika (Produced in city of Haskovo). Other notable brands are Stolichno (bock beer produced by Zagorka), Shumensko (both lager and red ale, produced in the city of Shumen), Burgasko (produced in the city of Burgas), MM (produced in the city of Varna), Pirinsko (brewed in the city of Blagoevgrad), Ledenika (brewed in the town of Mezdra), Lomsko (brewed in the town of Lom), Bolyarka (brewed in the city of Veliko Tarnovo), Britos (brewed in the city of Veliko Tarnovo), and Plevensko (produced in the city of Pleven). Most of the Bulgarian breweries are currently owned by foreign breweries, such as Heineken (Zagorka) and Molson Coors (Astika and Kamenitza).
