= Brito =

Brito or Britto may refer to:

== People ==
=== Surname ===
- Alonso Brito (born 1950), Cuban singer-songwriter
- Alyssa Brito, American softball player
- Anderson Brito (baseball) (born 2004), Venezuelan baseball player
- Ángel de Brito (born 1976), Argentine entertainment journalist
- Carlos Brito (disambiguation)
- Carmen Brito (born 1947), Chilean filmmaker, editor and restorer
- Diogo Brito (born 1997), Portuguese basketballer
- Elso Brito (born 1994), Dutch Capeverdian footballer
- Francisco das Chagas Rodrigues de Brito (born 1965), Brazilian rapist and serial killer
- Fernanda Brito (born 1992), Chilean tennis player
- Filipe de Brito e Nicote (c. 1566–1613), Portuguese adventurer, mercenary and viceroy of Syriam
- Flavia DeBrito, American politician
- Gary Brito (born 1963 or 1964), American general
- Hermenegildo Capelo or Hermenegildo de Brito Capelo (1841–1917), Portuguese explorer
- Jack Britto (1926–2013), Pakistani Olympic field hockey player
- Jhony Brito (born 1998), Dominican baseball player
- John de Brito (1647–1693), Portuguese Jesuit missionary, martyr and saint
- Jorge Horacio Brito (1952–2020), Argentine banker and businessman
- Juan Brito (disambiguation)
- Marcos Jose Brito, stage name QBoy, British hip hop artist and DJ
- Mario Brito (born 1966), Dominican Republic baseball player
- Max Brito (1968–2022), Ivory Coast rugby union player
- Michelle Larcher de Brito (born 1993), Portuguese tennis player
- Mike Brito (1934–2022), Cuban-American longtime baseball scout for the Los Angeles Dodgers
- Petronilho de Brito (1904–1983/4), Brazilian footballer
- Radulphus Brito (c. 1270–1320), French grammarian
- Romero Britto (born 1963), Brazilian artist, painter, serigrapher and sculptor
- Rusty Brito (born 1985), stage name J.R. Writer, Dominican-American rapper
- Ruth Britto, American mathematical physicist
- Sérgio Britto (born 1959), Brazilian rock keyboardist/singer
- Socrates Brito (born 1992), Dominican baseball player
- Tiago Brito (born 1991), Portuguese futsal player

=== Other ===
- Britto (footballer) (1914–?), Brazilian footballer Herminio de Brito
- Brito (footballer, born 1939) (1939–2026), Brazilian footballer Hércules Brito Ruas
- Brito (footballer, born 1987), Cape Verdean football forward Armindo Rodrigues Mendes Furtado
- William d'Aubigny (Brito), itinerant justice under King Henry I of England

== Places ==
- Brito (Guimarães), Portugal, a civil parish
- Rio Brito, a river in Nicaragua

== See also ==
- Britos, a surname
- Estádio Vila Capanema or Estádio Durival de Brito, a football stadium in Curitiba, Brazil
- São João de Brito, a civil parish in Lisbon, Portugal
