= Zagorka =

Bulgarian beer brand

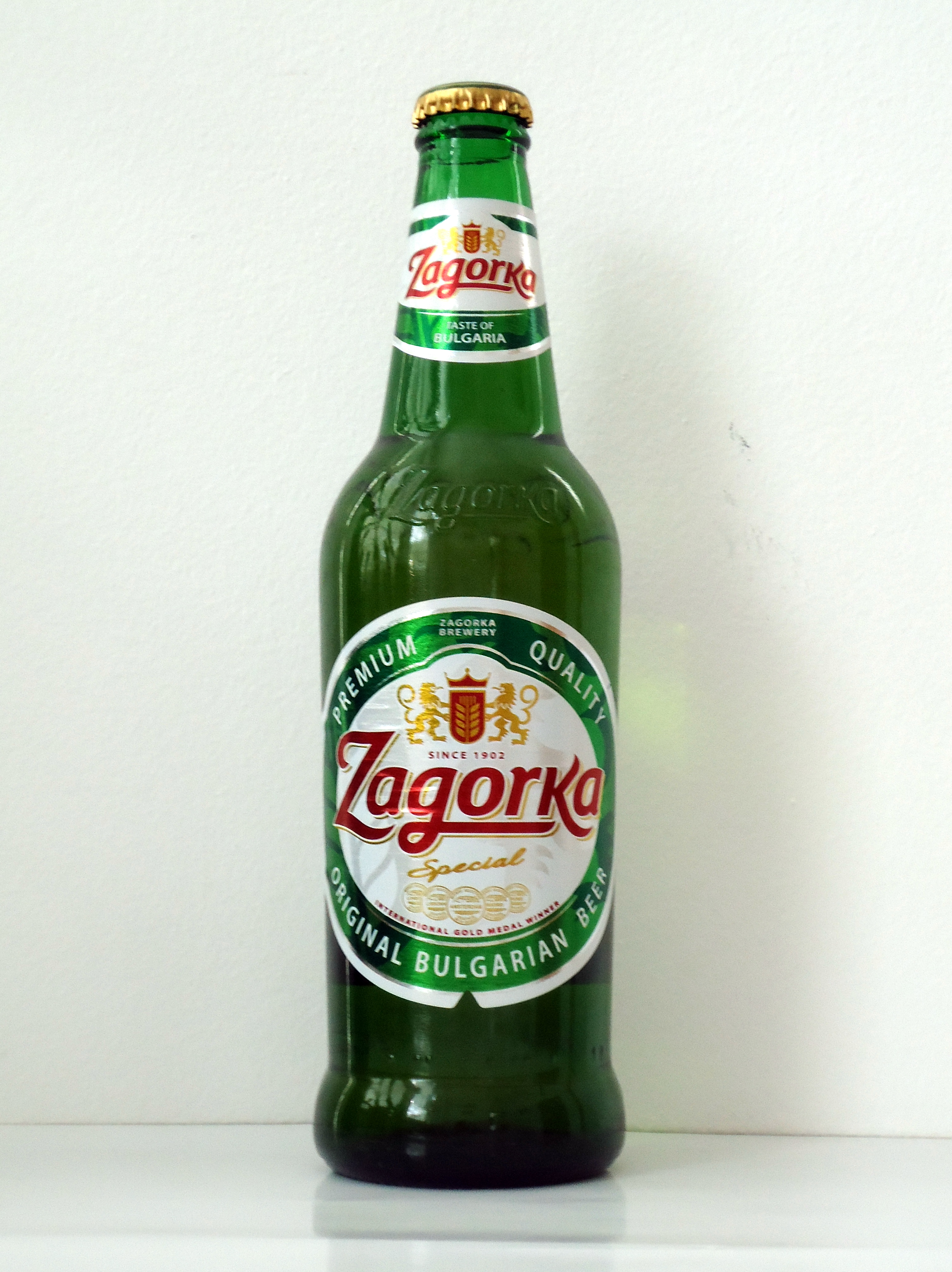
Zagorka Special – 2010s bottle

Zagorka is a Bulgarian beer brand from the city of Stara Zagora. It is brewed at the Zagorka Brewery.

The company was founded in 1902, in the Czech tradition, by a doctor who returned from Prague. The current brewery was opened in 1958 and since 1994 is owned by Heineken. The company produces three Bulgarian brands (Zagorka, Ariana and Stolichno) and four licensed brands (Heineken, Birra Moretti, Amstel and Desperados).

The "Zagorka" brand has three variants – Zagorka Special (lager, 5% ABV) and two artisan beers – Zagorka Reserve (dark, flavoured with berries, 6% ABV, since 2011) and Zagorka Fusion (Light, flavoured with grapes, 2% ABV, since 2012).

Historically, Zagorka had several other variants, including Zagorka Light (Загорка Светло), and Zagorka Gold (both until the early 2000s). The label was originally written in Cyrillic, with a period of overlap in the late 1990s ("Light" having Cyrillic labels and "Special" having Latin ones), and it is currently written mostly in Latin.

== Gallery ==
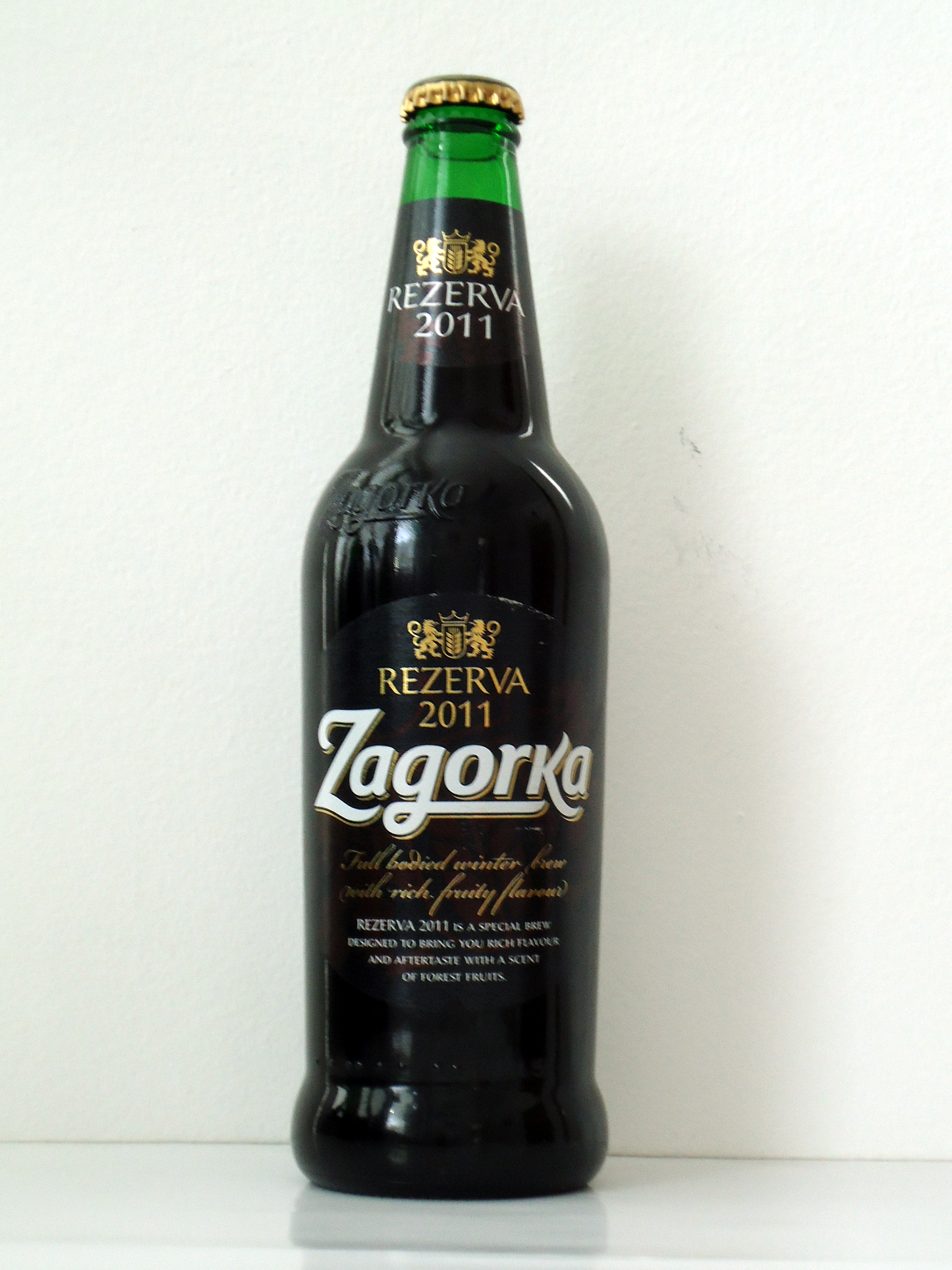
Zagorka Rezerva

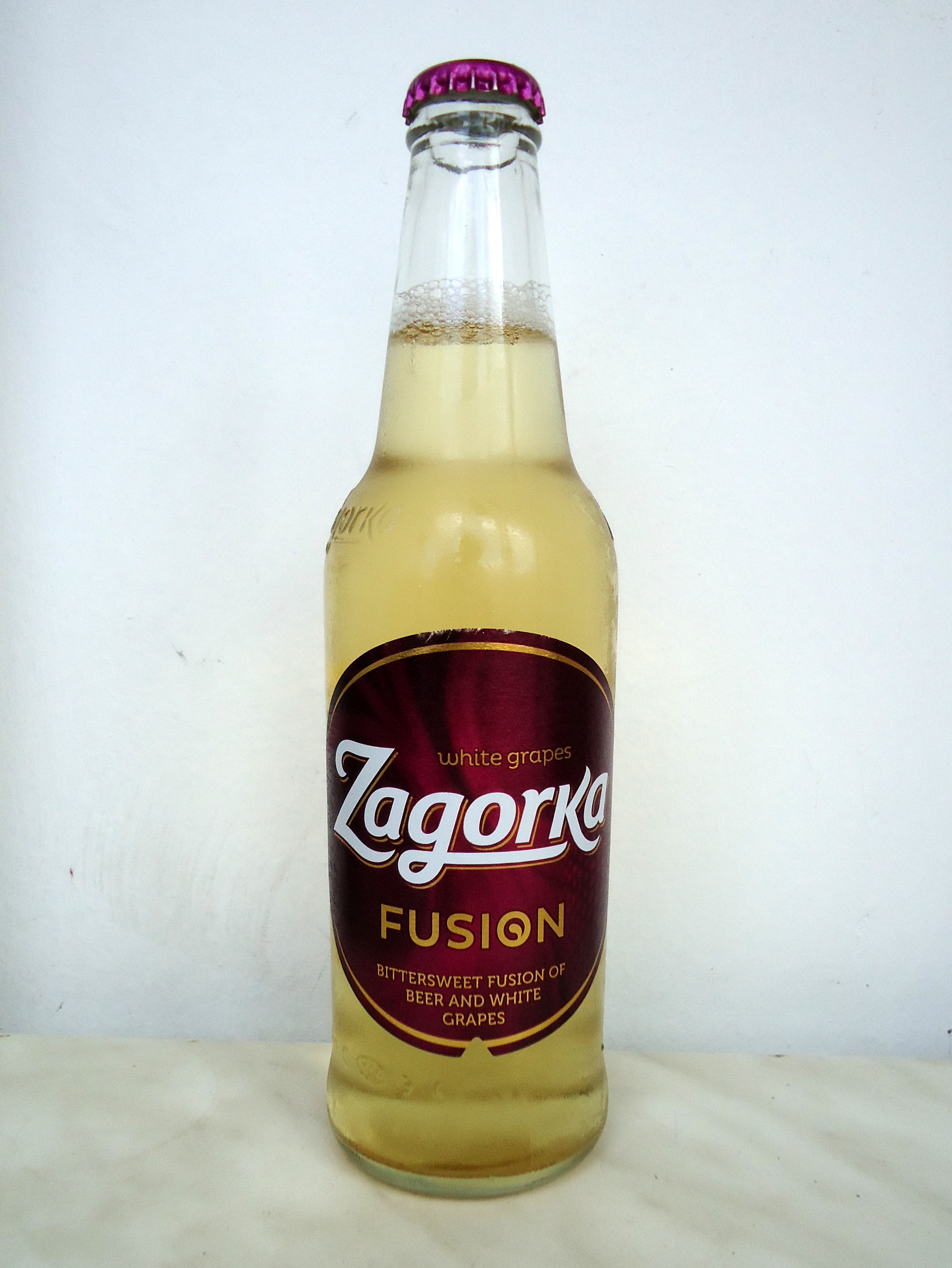
Zagorka Fusion
