= Ariana (disambiguation) =

Ariana is a historical term for a region of central Asia.

Ariana may also refer to:

- Ariana (name), a given name
- Ariana Grande, singer, songwriter and actress

== Places ==
- Ariana Governorate, Tunisia
  - Ariana, or Aryanah, coastal town
- Lake Ariana, in Sofia, Bulgaria

== Other uses ==
- Ariana beer, a Bulgarian beer brand
  - Ariana Brewery, a former Bulgarian brewery
- Ariana Afghan Airlines, flag carrier of Afghanistan
- Ariana Television Network, based in Kabul, Afghanistan
- Ariana Afghanistan, a satellite television channel based in California, U.S.
- Ariana Cinema, in Kabul, Afghanistan

== See also ==
- Ariadna (disambiguation)
- Ariadne (disambiguation)
- Arianna (disambiguation)
- Ariane (disambiguation)
- Aria (region), sometimes confused with Ariana
- Aryana (TV series)
