= Heineken brands =

Dutch beer brewer

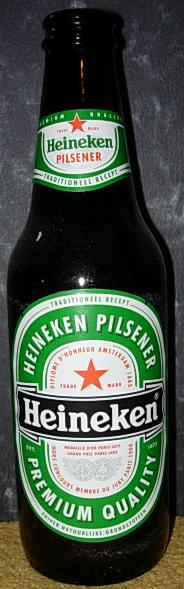
Dutch Heineken bottle

Heineken N.V. is a Dutch brewer which owns a worldwide portfolio of over 170 beer brands, mainly pale lager, though some other beer styles are produced. The two largest brands are Heineken and Tecate; though the portfolio includes Amstel, Fosters (in Europe and Vietnam), Sagres, Cruzcampo, Skopsko, Affligem, Żywiec, Starobrno, Zagorka, Zlatý Bažant, Laško and Birra Moretti.

== Heineken ==
Heineken Lager Beer is the company's flagship product. It is a 5% abv pale lager that was first brewed in 1868. It is produced by 40 breweries in 39 countries around the world. In 2006, 2.58 billion litres of Heineken was produced. Since 1975, most Heineken beer is brewed in the Heineken brewery in Zoeterwoude, Netherlands.

Other beers produced under the Heineken brand name include:

- Heineken Dark
- Heineken Oud Bruin
- Heineken Premium Light
- Heineken Tarwebok

== Buckler ==
Buckler is a low alcohol (0.5% abv) pale lager. It was launched in the summer of 1988. There was a recall in 2004 due to a fault in the pasteurising process, and Buckler is no longer available in the Netherlands (Heineken's home market) after the brand's image declined following Dutch comedian Youp van 't Hek mocking the brand (and its consumers) in a show in 1989.

Buckler was the beverage of choice for then US Vice President Joe Biden at the "Beer Summit" with Henry Louis Gates, James Crowley and President Barack Obama. The event was the result of the controversial arrest of Henry Louis Gates, which gained national attention regarding law enforcement racial profiling. Biden acknowledged that his choice of beer was “mostly ironic".

Former US President George W. Bush, who gave up drinking alcoholic beverages after turning 40, drank Buckler while relaxing with Chancellor of Germany Angela Merkel and British Prime Minister Tony Blair on 8 June 2007 during a break in the G8 summit.

== Subsidiaries' brands ==
=== Europe ===
==== Heineken Italy ====
Heineken's Italian operation began in 1974 with the acquisition of the Dreher brewery. In 1996 it added the Moretti brewery. Heineken Italy has six brewing plants producing over 575 million litres of beer, and employs over 1,000 people. Its plants are: Pollein (AO), Massafra (TA), Messina, Comun Nuovo (BG), Assemini (CA).

===== Birra Dreher =====
Birra Dreher was founded in Trieste in 1896. It was bought by Heineken in 1974.

===== Birra Ichnusa =====
Heineken also purchased Birra Ichnusa, a brewery founded in 1912 in Assemini, a town near the Sardinian capital Cagliari. It is named after the Latinized ancient name Sardinia, Hyknusa.

===== Birra Moretti =====
Birra Moretti was founded in Udine in 1859 by Luigi Moretti. Heineken acquired the company in 1996, selling the brewing plant to the new Castello beer company. There are eight beers under the Birra Moretti brand. Birra Moretti is the main brand, a 4.6% abv pale lager launched in 1859, followed by La Rossa is a 7.2% strong dark lager or dunkel. Other brands include Doppio Malto, Baffo d'Oro, and Sans Souci. It also has a number of bottled beers named after regions of Italy, such as Piemontese, a 5.5%ABV fruit beer.

==== Affligem Brewery ====
The Op-Ale brewery in Opwijk, Belgium was licensed by the Affligem Abbey to brew beers under the Affligem Abbey brand name, along with their own Op-Ale, as well as beers under the brand name of the Postel Abbey. Affligem was taken over by Heineken who renamed it the Affligem brewery.

The brewery produces a range of beers, including Affligem Blonde, a 6.8% pale ale; Affligem Dubbel, a 7% dubbel, Affligem Tripel, a 9.5% tripel and Affligem Patersvat, a 6.8% belgian ale.

==== Athenian Brewery ====
Amstel, Heineken, Athenian, Alfa Hellenic, Fischer, Marathon, Zorbas Athenian Brewery S.A. is one of the most important beer producers and traders in Greece. It was established in 1963 by a group of Greek entrepreneurs and is a member of Heineken Group N. V. In 1965, the first plant started its operation in Athens, producing Amstel beer. The second plant was inaugurated in 1974 in Thessaloniki, expanding the production, whereas Amstel became one of the most famous beers in the Greek market, just like it still is today.

In 1981, Athenian Brewery started Heineken beer's production in Greece, while a third plant started operating in Patra.

==== Amstel Brewery ====
The Amstel brewery was founded in 1870 in Amsterdam, Netherlands. It was taken over by Heineken in 1968, and the brewing plant closed down in 1972, with production moving to the main Heineken plant at Zoeterwoude.

Heineken offer several beers under the Amstel brand. Amstel Lager uses predominantly pilsener malt, although some Vienna malt is also used. It is sold in 75 countries. Amstel Light is a 3.5% abv pale lager. Amstel 1870 is a slightly dark 5% abv lager. In France a beer called Amstel Free, with minimal alcohol content – about 1% abv, is produced.

==== Beamish and Crawford ====
Beamish & Crawford in Cork brews both an Irish stout and a red ale. It has been part of Heineken since 2009.

==== Botchkarev Brewery ====
Botchkarev (Russian: Бочкарев) is a Russian brewery that started as a soft drinks company called Bravo, opening a brewery in St Petersburg in 1988.

In 1993 a group of Icelandic businessmen founded a bottling plant in Saint Petersburg, which was later sold to Pepsi. Since 1995 the company named "Bravo International" launched production of alcoholic long drinks and lemonades under "Bravo" brand at its new site.

In 1998 "Bravo International" started construction of a brewery in Saint Petersburg, where in February 1999, "Botchkarev" beer was first brewed. The "Botchkarov" brand of beer was created by Bravo's American marketing director, Brian Kean. The name and marketing message revived Russian beer-drinking traditions. Botchkarov is a Russian surname-- "botchka" which means barrel in Russian; and then linked it to the "proper" rules for beer consumption.

In 2002 Bravo sold its brewing business to Heineken. Since 2004 Bochkarev is brewed also under license in Almaty brewery Tian Shan; since 2006 its production started at a newly acquired PIT brewery in Kaliningrad. On top of that the beer has been available for export mainly in CIS countries and those with a notable number of Russian expats.

The assortment range includes the following beer types:

- Botchkarev lager (Botchkarev svetloye)
- Botchkarev classic (Botchkarev klassicheskoye)
- Botchkarev extra (Botchkarev krepkoye)
- Botchkarev without alcohol (Botchkarev bezalkogolnoye)

==== Brand Brewery ====
Brand Brewery is a Dutch brewery founded in 1871 by the Brand family in Wijlre. The name comes from the Brand family which in 1871 purchased the Netherlands' oldest brewery (originally founded in 1340) and remained in management after its acquisition by Heineken.

The brewery produces eight beers. Brand Pils is a 5.0% abv pale lager made since 1902. It is sold in the United States as Royal Brand Beer; Brand Urtyp is a 5.5% abv pale lager introduced in 1952 and claimed to be based on the Pilsener recipe from 1842 – Urtyp stands for "original"; Brand Oud Bruin (Brand Old Brown) is a 3.5% abv brown ale; Brand Cuvée a 5.5% abv top fermenting pale lager; Brand Imperator (since 1949) – 6.5% abv – amber colored, full malted premium beer; Brand Meibock (since 1994) a 6.5% abv goldbrown Spring seasonal beer; Brand Dubbelbock (since 1987) a 7.5% abv Autumn seasonal beer; Brand Sylvester (since 1984) a 7.5% abv Winter seasonal beer.

==== Caledonian Brewery ====
Caledonian Brewery is a Scottish brewery founded in 1869 in Edinburgh, primarily specialising in Scottish ale. Between 2004 and 2008, the brewery was bought by Scottish and Newcastle.

==== Central de Cervejas brewery ====
Sociedade Central de Cervejas (SCC) is a Portuguese brewery, founded in 1934, that produces a range of beers, mainly pale lagers. Its main output is the Sagres brand of beers. The company has been controlled since April 2008 by Heineken. The Sagres brand was created in 1940 to represent Sociedade Central de Cervejas at the Portuguese World Exhibition, and is named after a town of the same name. It was the first beer to be exported by SCC, arriving first in Gibraltar before being exported to the Azores and the various Portuguese Overseas Territories across the world.

Sagres beers made:

- Sagres
- Sagres Preta
- Sagres Bohemia
- Sagres Radler
- Sagres sem Álcool
- Sagres sem Álcool Preta
- Sagres Special Editions

==== Cruzcampo Brewery ====
Founded in 1904 by Roberto Osborne and Agustín Osborne in Seville, takes the name of La Cruz del Campo (The Cross of the Field), which used to be a cross in the middle of the field, which still stands today next to the brewery in Seville.

Nowadays it is part of the Heineken corporation who bought it from Guinness. Cruzcampo can be found anywhere in Spain, but it is in Andalusia where it is most consumed. It has breweries in Seville, Madrid, Valencia, Jaén and Arano. The logo since 1926 has been the figure of Gambrinus, a legendary creator of beer. Cruzcampo is the sponsor of the Spain national football team.

Beers also made:

- Cruzcampo Pilsen 4.8% ABV
- Cruzcampo "Gran Reserva" 6.4% ABV strong lager, winner of the 2009 World Beer Awards.
- Shandy Cruzcampo 0.9% ABV.
- Cruzcampo Export.
- Cruzcampo Sin, Alcohol Free.
- Cruzcampo Navidad (Brewed only in Christmas)
- Cruzcampo Light, 2.4% ABV
- Cruzcampo Pilsner, sin Gluten
- Big Cruzcampo.
- El León.
- Krone Lager.
- Spieler Pils.

==== De Ridder Brewery ====
The De Ridder brewery in Maastricht was taken over by Heineken and closed in 2002. Wieckse Witte, a 5% abv white beer, was introduced in 1988.

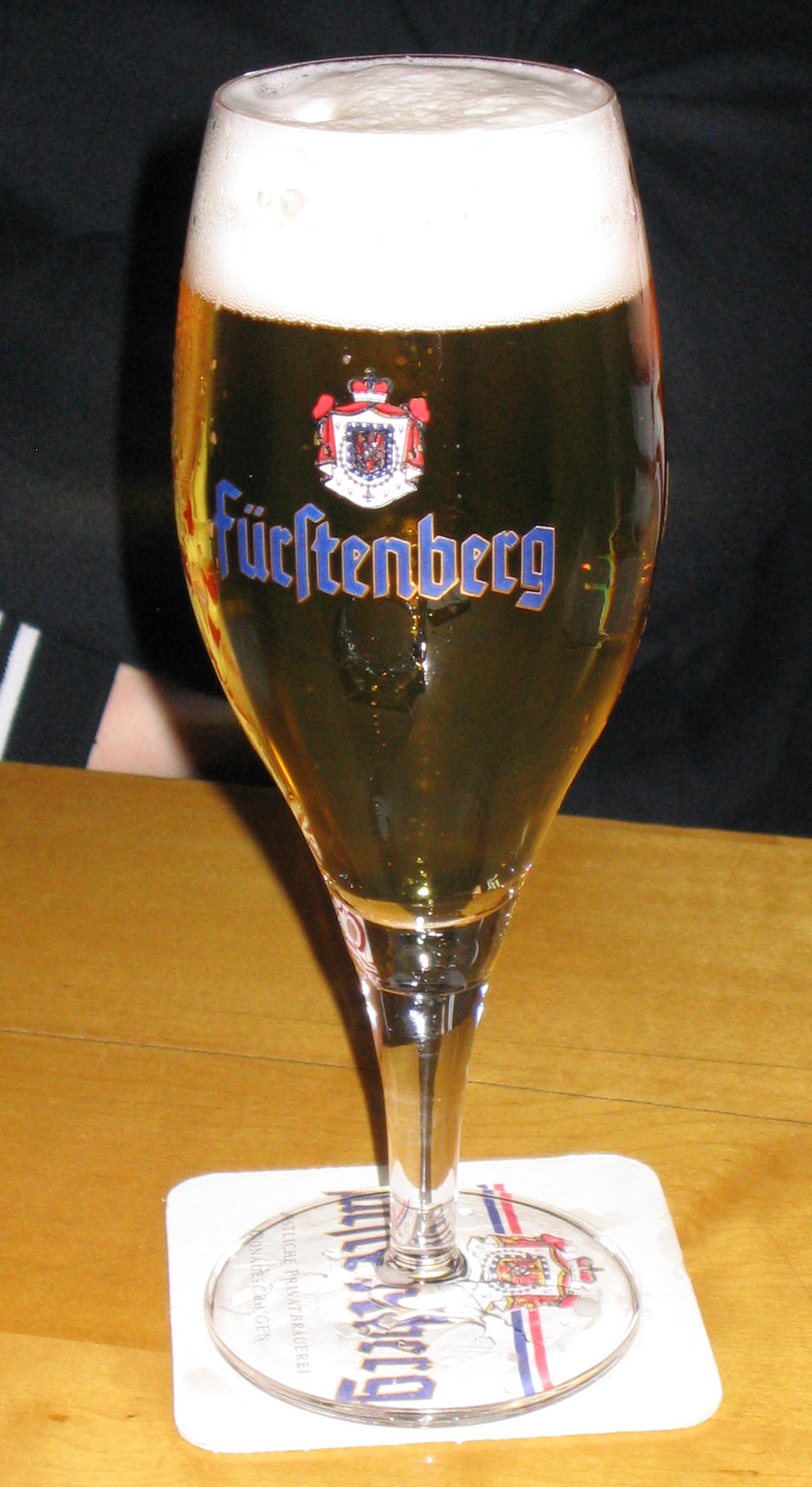
A glass of Fürstenberg

==== Fürstenberg Brewery ====
The Princely Fürstenberg Brewery (Fürstlich Fürstenbergische Brauerei KG) was founded in Donaueschingen, Germany in 1283 by the Princely House of Fürstenberg. Heineken acquired the brewery in October 2004 through their Brau Holding International AG company which is co-owned by Schörghuber.

The brewery produces Fürstenberg Gold, and Qowaz, a drink made from a mix of wheat beer, cola and lemongrass.

==== Karlovačko Brewery ====
The Karlovačko Brewery (hr: Karlovačka pivovara, shortform Karlovačko) is a Croatian brewery, founded in 1854 by local landowner Baron Nikola Vranyczany in the town of Karlovac. In 2003, Heineken International acquired a majority stake.

As of December 2006, the following beers are brewed regularly by Karlovačko:

- Karlovačko pivo (lager)
- Karlovačko Radler lemon (radler)
- Karlovačko Radler grapefruit (radler)
- Karlovačko crno (dark lager)
- Karlovačko Rally (non-alcoholic beer)
- Heineken
- Gösser Dark
- Kaiser
- Edelweiss Snowfresh
- Desperados

==== Krušovice Brewery ====
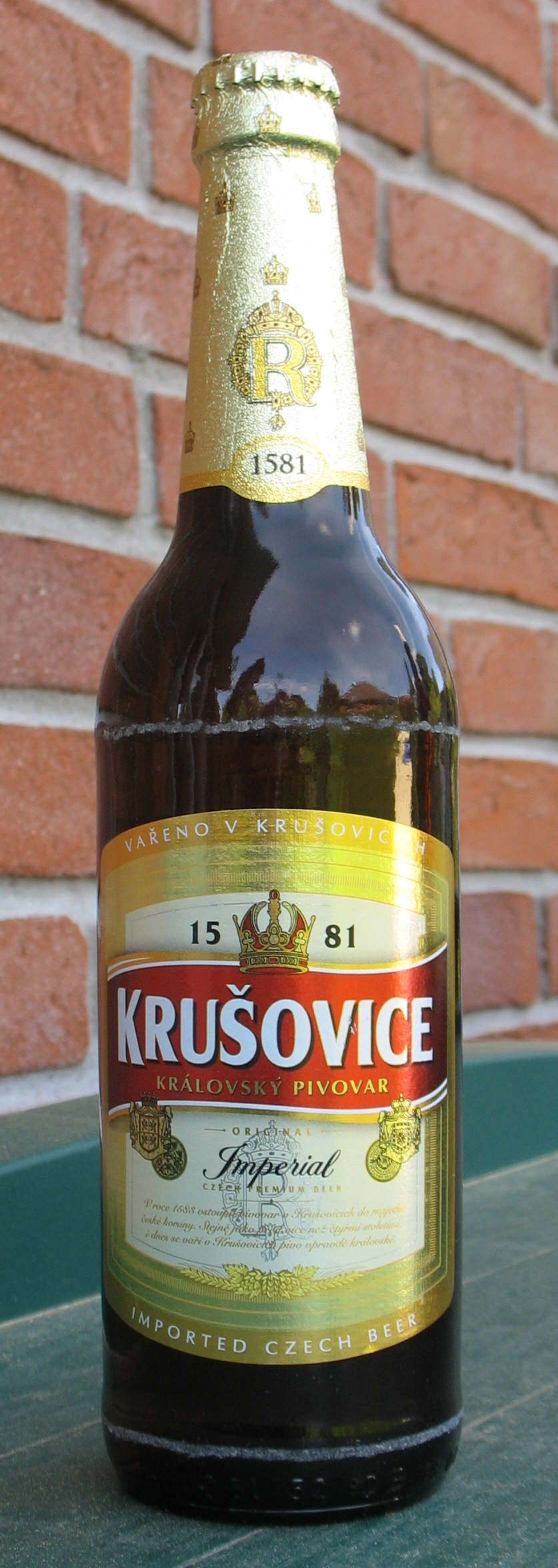
A beer bottle of Krušovice beer

The Royal Brewery of Krušovice (Czech: Královský pivovar Krušovice, shortform Krušovice) is a Czech brewery, established in 1581 by Jiří Birka in the village of Krušovice. The brewery gained a contract to provide beer to Emperor Rudolf II in 1583, allowing them to use the Imperial Crown of Austria as part of the company's logo. The company was acquired by Heineken in July 2007.

As of December 2023, the following beers are brewed regularly by Krušovice:

- Krušovice Originál 10°
- Krušovice Mušketýr 11°
- Krušovice Ležák 12°
- Krušovice Královský Ležák
- Krušovice černé

==== Murphy's Brewery ====
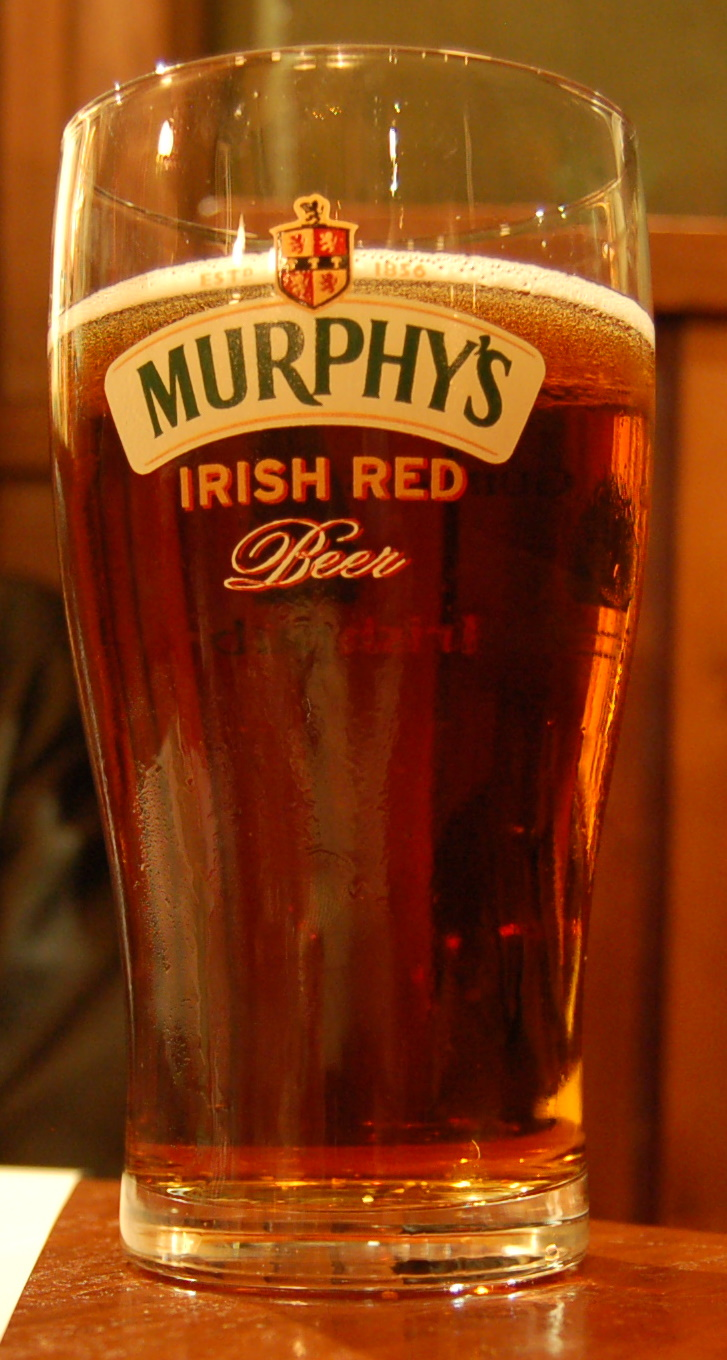
A glass of Murphy's Irish Red

Murphy's brewery was founded in Cork, Ireland in 1856. It was known as Lady's Well Brewery until it was purchased by Heineken in 1983, when the name changed to Murphy Heineken Brewery Ireland Ltd.

The two most notable brands are Murphy's Irish Stout, a 4.3% Irish stout, and Murphy's Irish Red, a 5% Irish ale.

==== France ====
- Ancre
- Fischer Tradition
- Fischer Réserve Ambrée
- Fischer Blanche
- Fischer La Belle Strasbourgeoise
- Pêcheur
- Adelscott
- Desperados
- Edelweiss

===== Brasserie Pelforth (Pelforth brewery) =====
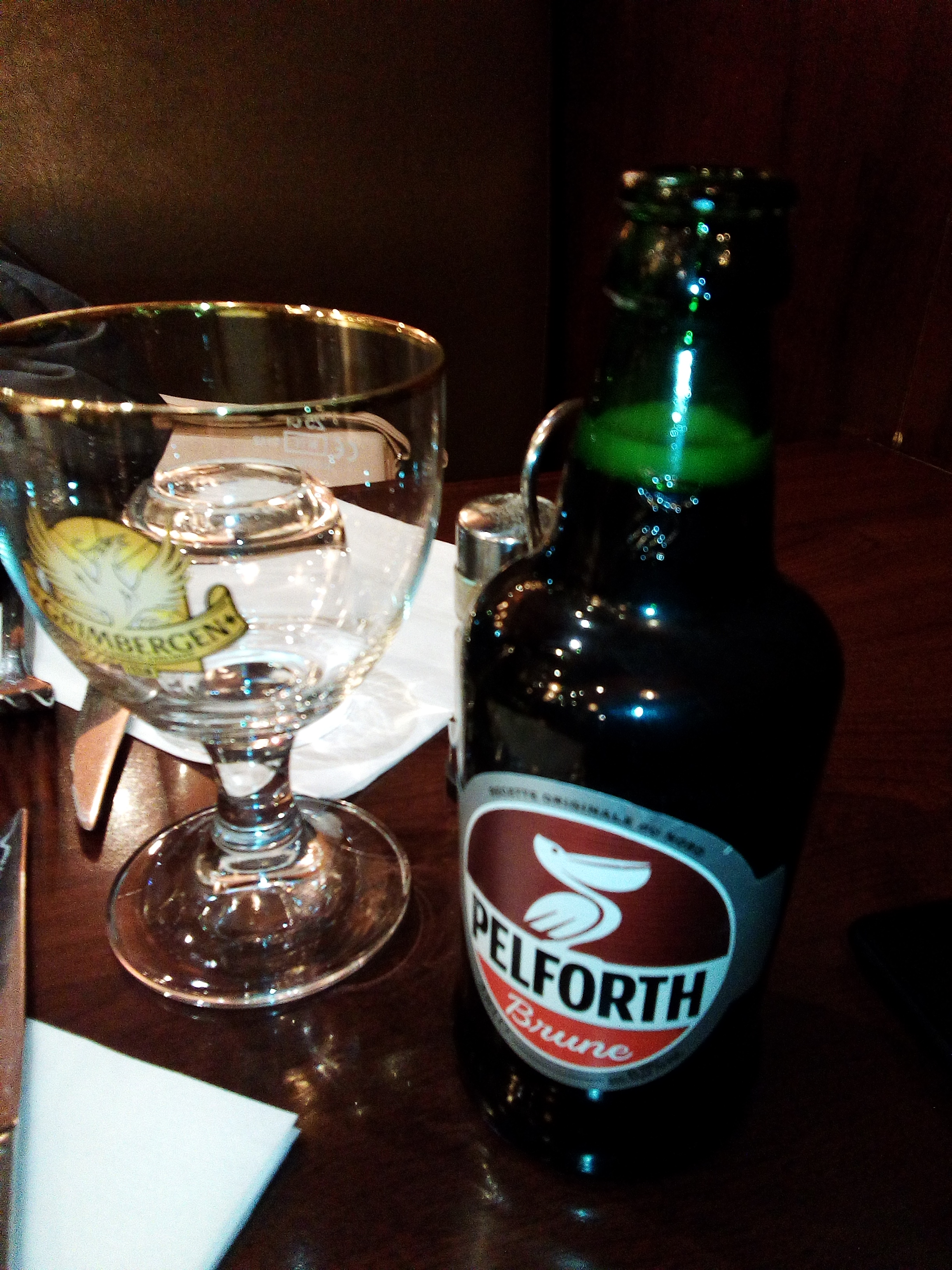
Pelforth Brune

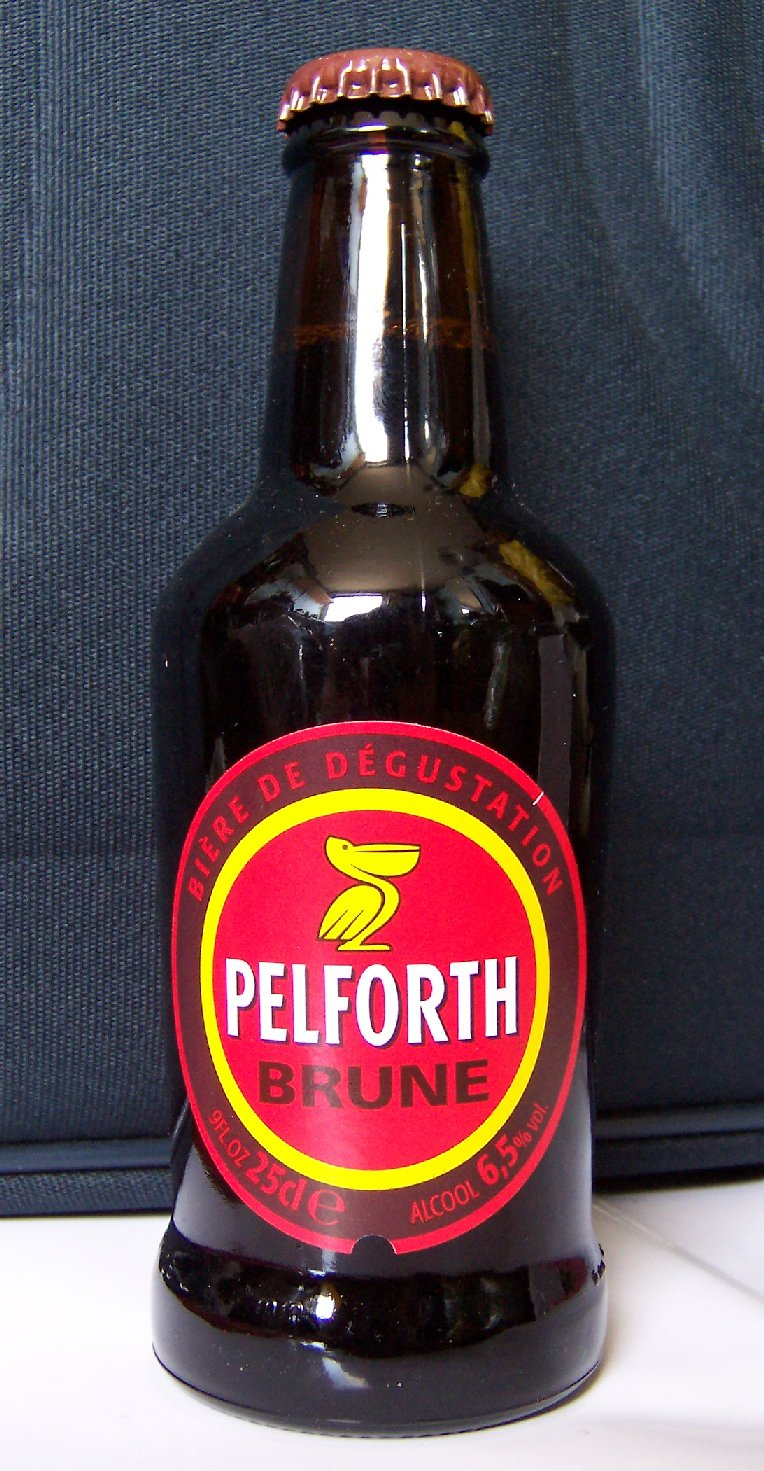
25 cl bottle of Pelforth Brune

Pelforth is a French brewery founded in 1914 in Mons-en-Barœul by three Lillois brewers. It was originally called Pelican, after a dance popular at the time. Production was stopped during World War II, restarting in 1950. The brewery name was changed in 1972 to Pelforth. It was bought by Français de Brasserie in 1986, which was acquired by Heineken International in 1988.

The brewery produces the Pelforth brand of beers: Pelforth, an ale, was first brewed in 1935 using two different types of malt and English yeast. The name came from "Pel" for pelican, "forte" for strong, because it contains a lot of malt (43 kg/hL), and the h added to give it an English feel. In addition to the Blonde (5.8% abv) and Brune (6.5% abv), Pelforth Amber (6% abv) was introduced in 2003. The Pelforth brewery also produces George Killian's, a 6.5% amber or Irish ale. Among connoisseurs, it is "famous for its strong speciality beers".

==== Skopje Brewery ====
The Skopje Brewery (Macedonian: Пивара Скопје, Pivara Skopje) is a Macedonian brewery in Skopje. It is a joint venture between Coca-Cola HBC AG and Heineken International. Skopje brews the Skopsko brand as well as Gorsko.

Skopsko (Cyrillic: Скопско) is a 4.9% pale lager introduced in 1924. The ingredients are water; barley malt; unmalted cereals; hops; and brewers yeast. The advertising slogan is "Our Best" (Macedonian: Нашето најдобро!).

==== Soproni Sörgyár ====
Heineken Hungária is the Hungarian branch of the company. Its main production site, Soproni Sörgyár (Sopron) was founded in 1895. It was acquired by Heineken in 2003 by the purchase of the then-owner Austrian Bräu-Union AG.

==== Starobrno Brewery ====
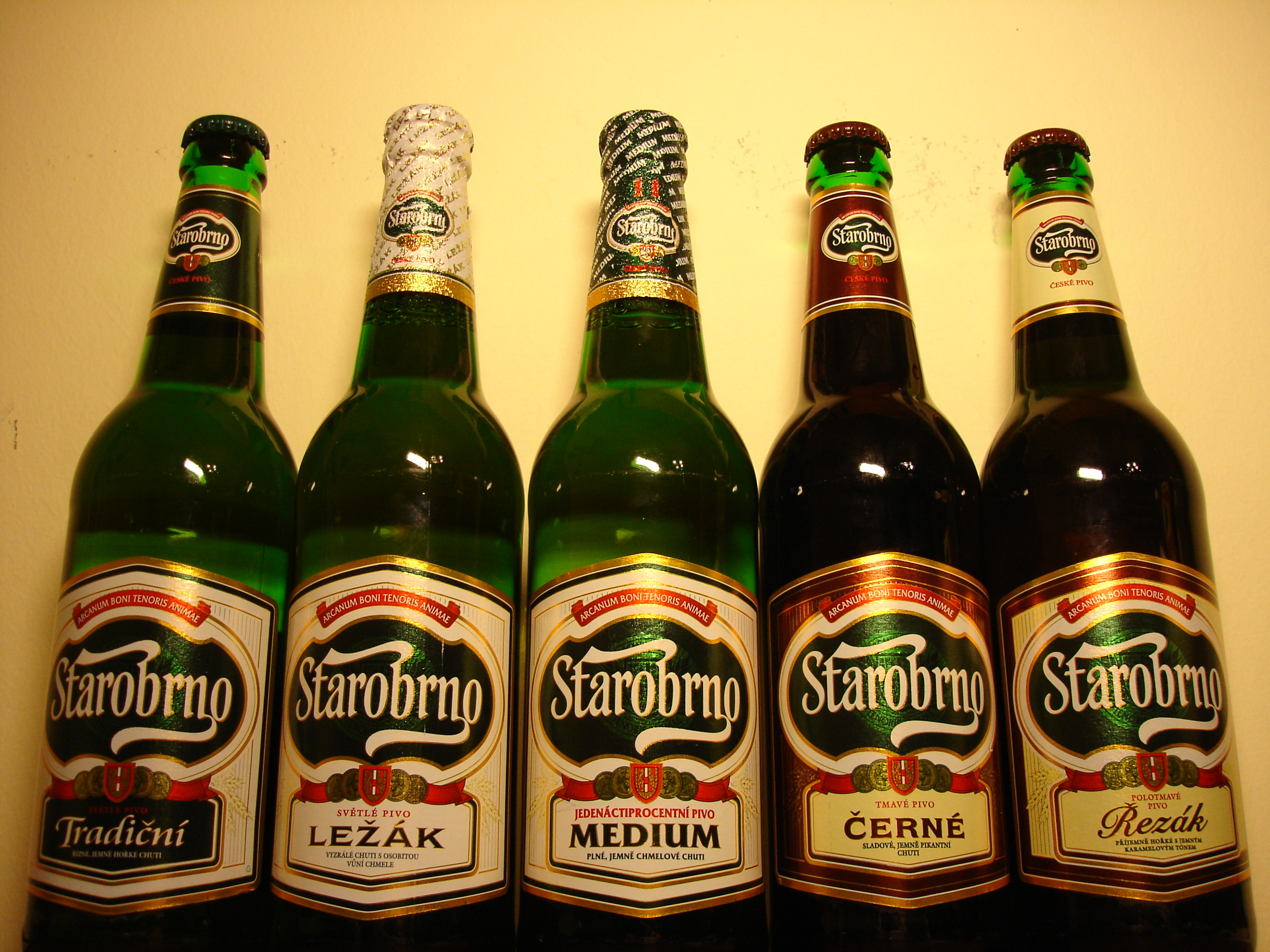
A selection of Starobrno beers

Starobrno (Pivovar Starobrno), is a brewery in Brno, Czech Republic, founded in 1325 by the Old Brno monastery. It is now owned by Heineken. The main brand is Starobrno, a 5% abv pale lager.

==== Zagorka Brewery ====
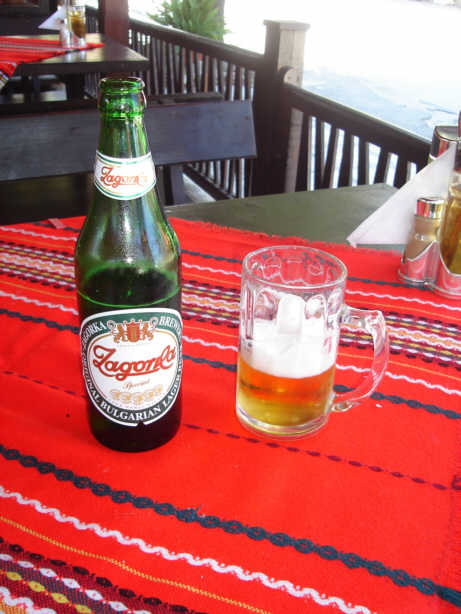
A bottle of Zagorka

The Zagorka brewery was founded in 1902 and is based in Stara Zagora, Bulgaria. In the mid-1990s Zagorka became a fully owned subsidiary of Heineken. The brewery brews various Heineken brands for distribution within Bulgaria, and three exclusive brands: Zagorka (Bulgarian: Загорка, 5% abv), named after the brewery's home city of Stara Zagora; and Stolichno (a 6.5% abv strong dark lager or bock) and Ariana (a 4.5% pale lager), both originally produced in Sofia by the Ariana Brewery.

==== Zlatý Bažant Brewery ====
Zlatý Bažant brewery was founded in 1969 in Slovakia, then bought by Heineken in 1995. There are several brands, among them Zlatý Bažant 12° (Golden Pheasant), a 5% abv (12 degrees Plato) pale lager, and Kelt 12°, another 5% pale lager.

==== Żywiec Brewery ====
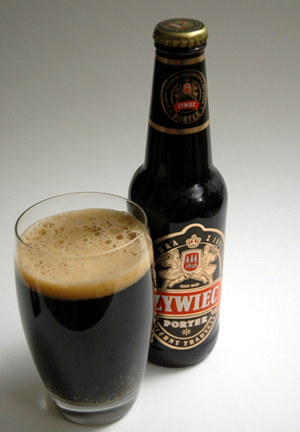
ŻywiecPorter

Żywiec Brewery was founded in 1852 by the Habsburg family in Żywiec in Silesia, Poland. It was nationalised after the Second World War. The brewery was acquired by Heineken in the mid-1990s along with the Warszawskie Brewery, Warsaw.

The brewery produces several brands of beer, usually pale lagers of varying strengths from usually 10.5° to 14° Balling or 4–6% alcohol, including:

- Żywiec Full a pale lager
- Żywiec Porter a Baltic porter
- Żywiec Full Light a pale lager
- Królewskie (English translation: Royal), a 6% abv pale lager distributed in Warsaw and Poland. The label shows an image of King Sigismund III Vasa. In 2005 production was moved to the Warka Brewery.

=== Middle East and Africa ===
==== Al Ahram Brewery ====
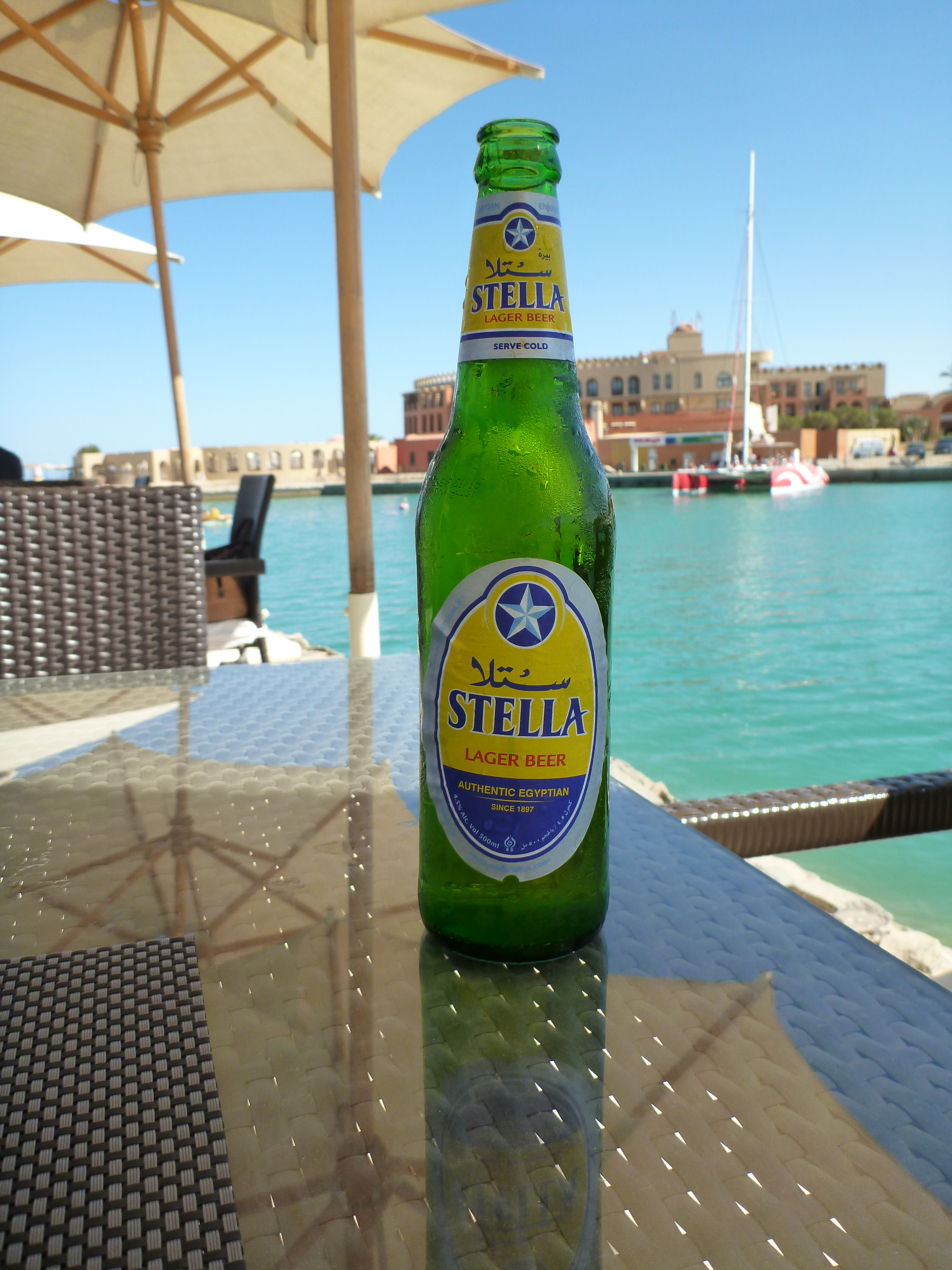
Stella Lager, brewed in Egypt

Al Ahram (Al Ahram Beverages Company or ABC) is an Egyptian brewery previously in Giza, Egypt and currently in Obour City (Qalyubiyya Governorate), founded in 1897. The company was nationalized in 1963 during the tenure of Egypt's second president, Gamal Abdel Nasser. It was privatized in 1997. It was bought by Heineken International in 2002.

ABC produces the local brands along with a range of soft drinks.

Local Beers

- Stella 50cl, 33cl – 4.5% Alc/vol (Flagship Brand)
- Stella 50cl returnable bottle – 4.5%Alc/vol

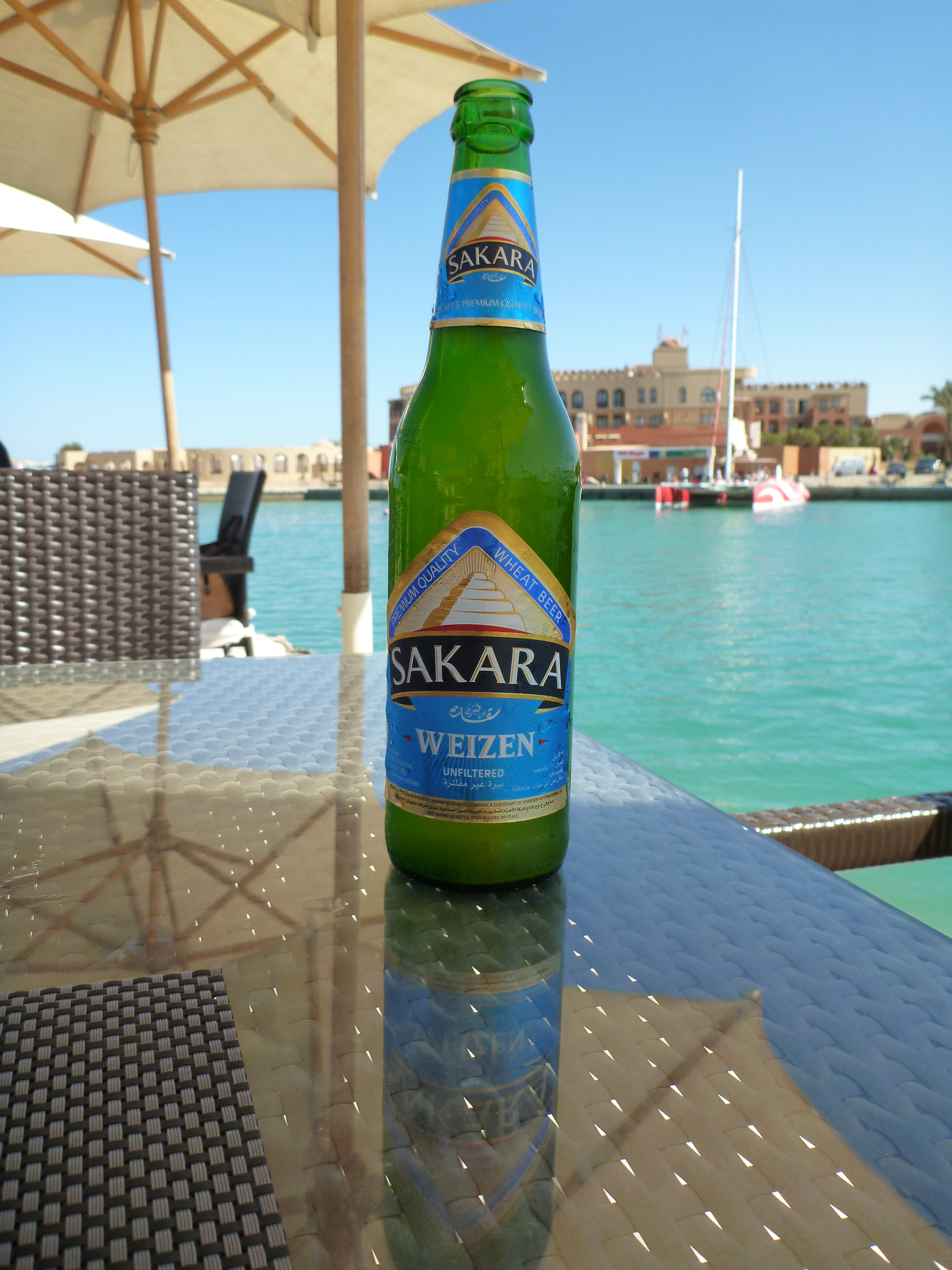
A bottle Sakara Weizen

- Sakara Gold 50cl, 33cl – 4.0%Alc/vol
- Sakara Weizen 50cl – 5.0%Alc/vol (German Weißbier Style Brew)
- Sakara King 50cl – 10.0%Alc/vol
- Meister Max – 8.0%Alc/vol
- Sakara El King (Double Imperial Lager) – 15.0%Alc/vol
- Heineken 50cl, 33cl – 5.0%Alc/vol
- Desperados 33cl – 5.9%Alc/vol – Tequila Flavored Lager

Non Alcoholic Beverages

- Amstel Zero – 0.0%Alc/vol
- Birell – 0.0%Alc/vol
- Fayrouz – 0.0%Alc/vol – Multiple flavors

Export Beer:

- Rex Strong Beer 50cl – 8% Alc/vol (Lebanon)
- Meister Export – 5.2% Alc/Vol

RTD Beverages

- ID Edge 5.0%Alc/vol – Watermelon
- ID Double Edge 10.0%Alc/vol – (Energy / Watermelon / Green Apple / Pineapple)
- Cubana Rum Mix 10.0%Alc/vol – (Melon / Cola)
- Butler's Gin Mix 10.0%Alc/vol – Lemon & Mint

==== Almaza Brewery ====
Almaza beer

Almaza (Brasserie Almaza S.A.L.) is a Lebanese brewery and beer brand, founded in 1933 in Bauchrieh by Lebanese shareholders, mainly the Jabre family, the Almaza Brewery was initially called Brasserie Franco-Libano-Syrienne.

In 1950, the name of the brewery changed to Brasserie et Malterie Almaza. In 1960, the second generation of shareholders took over the management of the brewery. After the Lebanese Civil War in the 1990s the brewery took its final name: Brasserie Almaza.

In December 2021, Philippe Jabre took majority ownership of Brasserie Almaza.

Almaza exports to Canada, the United States, United Kingdom, France, Australia and in the Gulf countries.

Beers:

- Almaza Pilsener 33cl 4.2% alc.
- Almaza Pilsener 50cl 4.2% alc.
- Almaza Pure Malt 6% alc. (malt beer)
- Al Rayess Beer 5% alc.
- Almaza Light 33cl 2.7% alc.
- Almaza Radler (beer & lemon) 33cl 2.0% alc.
- Laziza Apple Light 0% alc.
- Almaza Special Dark, 33cl 6.0% alc.

==== Sedibeng Brewery ====
Heineken entered the South African beer market by building a large greenfields brewery in Midvaal south of Johannesburg. This is a joint venture with Diageo (who own 25%) and was opened in 2010.

Brands produced here:

- Heineken Lager
- Amstel Lager
- Windhoek Lager
- Smirnoff Spin
- Smirnoff Storm

=== Asia-Pacific ===
==== Partnership with Fraser & Neave ====
Heineken and Fraser & Neave set up Malayan Breweries in 1931. In 1990, Malayan Breweries changed to its present name, Asia Pacific Breweries (APB) and acquired 90% of DB Breweries in 2004.

==== Asia Pacific Breweries ====
Launched in 1932, Tiger Beer became Singapore's first locally brewed beer. It is a 5% abv bottled pale lager. As APB's exclusive flagship brand, it is available in more than 60 countries worldwide.

Reeb is a brand of beer produced by Asia Pacific Breweries. Reeb is "beer" spelled backwards. Its Chinese brand name is 力波啤酒. The first two characters 力波 (meaning "strong wave", pronounced libo) are the closest pronunciation there is in Chinese to Reeb. Reeb's distribution is primarily in the Shanghai area.

==== DB Breweries ====
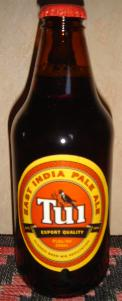
Tui beer

DB Breweries is a New Zealand brewing company founded in 1930 by Sir Henry Kelliher and Morton Coutts in Auckland. Asia Pacific Breweries acquired 90% of DB Breweries in 2004.

There are several beers produced under the DB brand, including DB Draught, a 4% amber coloured lager and Export Gold, a 4% pale lager.

Export Gold was first brewed as DB Export as a result of the "Black Budget" from then Minister of Finance Arnold Nordmeyer which imposed extremely high duty on imported premium lagers, though the extent to which the 'black budget' influenced the creation of DB Export is currently under dispute. DB Export was initially brewed as a 5.4% premium lager and with "Export" in the title to compete with international premium lagers. In 1994, the name was changed from DB Export to DB Export Gold, and in 1998 to simply Export Gold.

==== Tui Brewery ====
The Tui Brewery was established in 1889 in Mangatainoka in the Wairarapa region of North Island New Zealand by Henry Wagstaff and Edward Lyons Russell; it was taken over by DB Breweries in 1969. The brewery tower is shown in advertising campaigns for Tui Beer which feature a statement, such as "War will bring peace" followed by the dismissive tag line "Yeah right". Tui East India Pale Ale (Tui), a 4% amber lager, is the main brand.

==== Monteith's ====
Monteith's Brewery Company was originally a family-owned brewery on New Zealand's South Island West coast. DB Breweries bought it and closed its Greymouth brewery in 2001; this was since reopened, however, and production also takes place at Auckland.
