= Birra Moretti =

Italian brewing company

Coordinates: 46.0705468°N 13.2355987°E

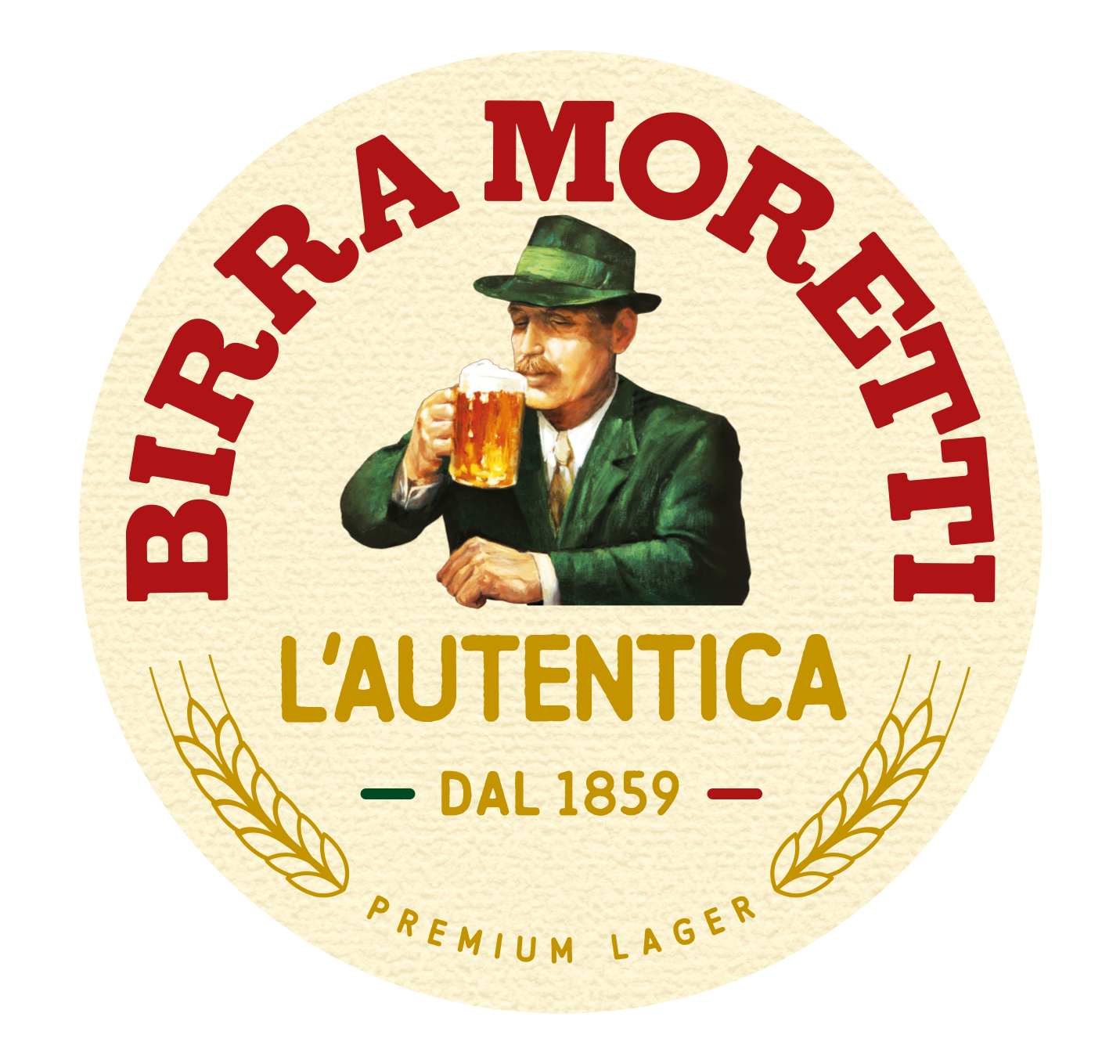
- Interactive map of Birra Moretti
- Location: Udine, Italy
- Opened: 1859; 167 years ago
- Owned by: Heineken
- Website: birramoretti.it

Active beers
Name	Type
Birra Moretti	Pale lager
Birra Moretti La Rossa	Double bock
Baffo d'Oro	Premium malt
Birra Moretti Doppio Malto	Blonde ale
Birra Moretti Zero	Non-alcoholic
San Souci	Premium lager

Birra Moretti (Italian pronunciation: [moˈretti]) is an Italian brewing company, founded in Udine in 1859 by Luigi Moretti. In 1996, the company was acquired by Heineken N.V. The brewing plant in Udine was sold to the newly formed Birra Castello S.p.A., and the beer is now also brewed in different locations including in Manchester, England.

== History ==
Birra Moretti was founded in 1859 by Luigi Moretti in Udine, which at that time was still part of the Austrian Empire, as the Beer and Ice Factory. The first bottles went on sale in 1860. The company was initially expected to produce 250,000 litres of beer a year, enough to meet the provincial demand.

On the company's official website, it is said that in 1942 the Commendatore Lao Menazzi Moretti saw an elderly mustached gentleman sitting at a table in the historical trattoria Boschetti of Tricesimo in the province of Udine. Moretti, thinking that the man could represent his beer very well, decided he would ask permission to photograph him in exchange for a reward to the man's liking. "Che al mi dedi di bevi, mi baste" - said the man in the Friulian language, or "Give me to drink, enough for me". That photo was later handed over to the illustrator Segala, alias Franca Segala, who designed the famous manifesto.

Another version states that the photo was taken by the German photographer Erika Groth-Schachtenberger in 1939. The photo portrayed a Tyrolean farmer from Thaur in Tirol, a few kilometers from Innsbruck. Groth would not have authorized the use of her picture if she knew it would be used for the Moretti advertising campaigns in 1956. She saw it in a billboard and this discovery resulted in a legal dispute.

Over the years, the Moustache was played by various actors. The most familiar face was actor and voice actor Marcello Tusco, replaced after his death by Orso Maria Guerrini.

By the late 1980s Birra Moretti was the third largest brewery in Italy, with ten percent of the market.

The Moretti family owned the brewery and business until 1989, when a 70 percent stake was sold to the Labatt Brewing Company.

The original factory in Udine was closed in 1992 after brewing was transferred to San Giorgio di Nogaro, also in Friuli.

Interbrew acquired the business with the takeover of Labatt in 1995. Interbrew sold the company to Heineken in 1996.

Following the finding by the Italian Antitrust Authority that Heineken occupied a dominant position in the Italian market, the company was forced to sell the brewery in San Giorgio di Nogaro in 1997. It was subsequently bought by a new brewing consortium called the Birra Castello Group, which now owns the property. Production of Birra Moretti beers was then moved to various other plants around Italy controlled by the Heineken group, such as those at Assemini, Comun Nuovo, Massafra, and Pollein.

In 2015, Heineken launched six new Birra Moretti products: two new Radler, Birra Moretti Radler Gazzosa, and Chinotto as well as six beers dedicated to the culinary traditions of Italian regions: Birra Moretti to Friuli, Birra Moretti Sicilian, Beer Moretti Piedmontese, Birra Moretti Tuscan, Birra Moretti Apulian, and that of Lucana.

In 2024, Heineken launched Sale Di Mare as a new product in the UK market. Sale Di Mare is a medium bodied premium lager with a hint of Italian sea salt at 4.8% ABV.

== Beers ==
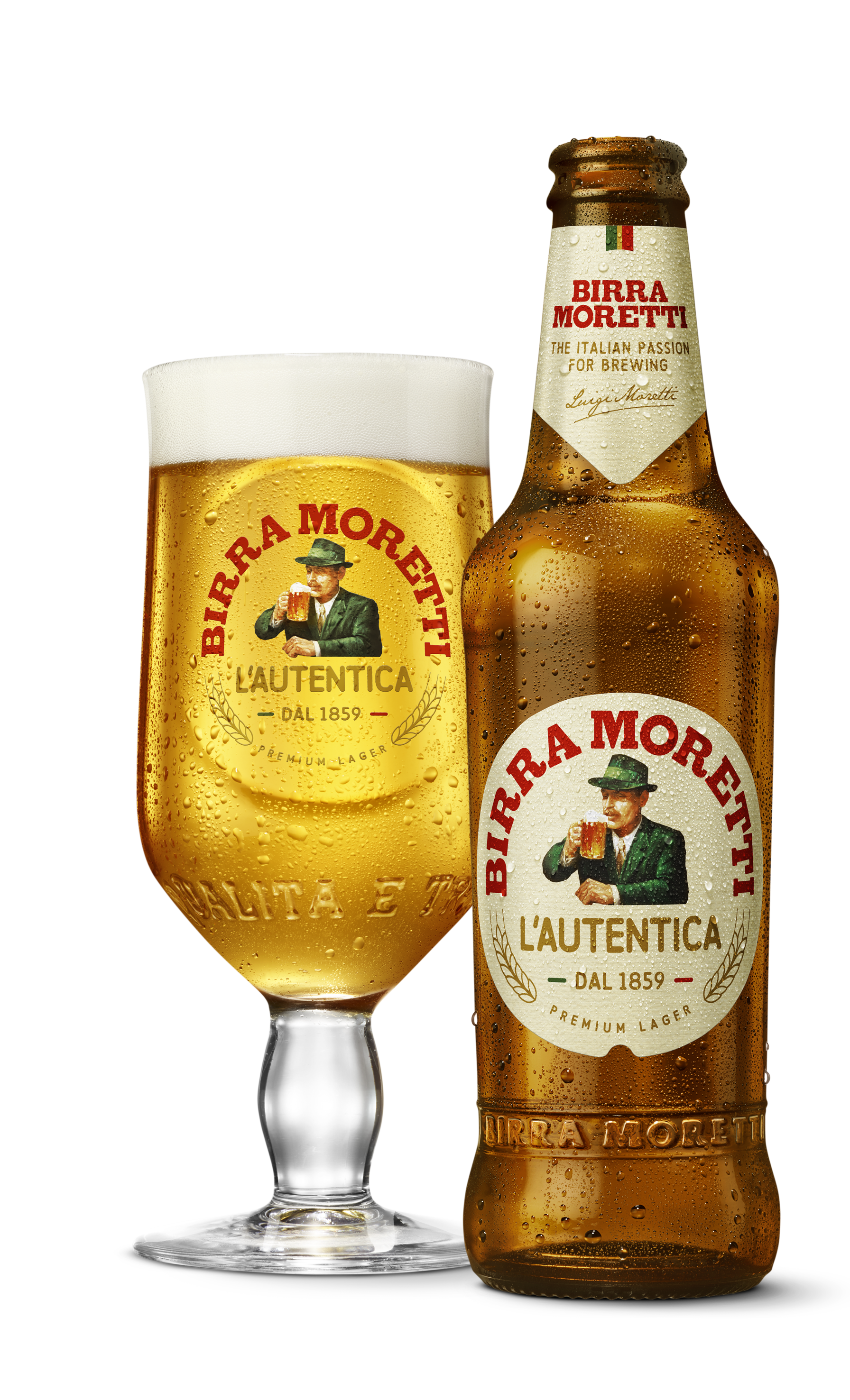
Birra Moretti Chalice glassware & 330ml bottle

There are six beers under the Birra Moretti brand. Birra Moretti is the main brand, a 4.6% abv pale lager launched in 1859; followed by La Rossa, a 7.2% strong dark lager or doppelbock. Other brands include:

- Birra Moretti Ricetta Originale: lager beer with a golden color with an alcohol content of 4.6% vol.
- Birra Moretti Baffo D'Oro: bottom-fermented beer, brewed using only Italian spring malts, alcohol content 4.8% vol.
- Birra Moretti Grand Cru: Ale beer, re-fermented in the bottle, the amber color. It is produced in Belgium by Affligem brewery.
- Birra Moretti Doppio Malto: Ale beer, golden in color with an alcohol content 7% vol.
- Birra Moretti La Bianca: Weiss beer, top-fermented, light in color with alcohol content 5% vol.
- Birra Moretti La Rossa: double malt beer from dark amber color alcohol content 7.2% vol.
- Birra Moretti Radler Limone: Radler beer bottom-fermented, pale yellow color, produced using Sicilian lemons with alcohol 2% vol.
- Birra Moretti Radler Chinotto: Radler beer bottom-fermented, amber color, produced using chinotti from Savona with alcohol 2% vol.
- Birra Moretti Radler Gazzosa: Radler beer bottom-fermented, pale yellow color, produced using Calabrian lemons with alcohol 2% vol.
- Birra Moretti alla Friulana: lager, light colored and straw produced using rennet apples from the Friuli-Venezia Giulia, with alcohol content 5.9% vol.
- Birra Moretti alla Siciliana: lager beer, produced using orange blossoms from Sicily with alcohol content 5.8% vol.
- Birra Moretti alla Piemontese: lager beer, with a slightly amber color, characterized by the presence, among the ingredients of blueberries and rice from Piedmont, with alcohol content 5.5% vol.
- Birra Moretti alla Toscana: lager beer, the honey color, produced using such ingredients, barley grown in Tuscany with alcohol content 5.5% vol.
- Birra Moretti alla Pugliese: lager beer, golden yellow color, produced using, as an ingredient, the prickly pear and burnt wheat, with alcohol content 5.6% vol.
- Birra Moretti alla Lucana: lager, amber color, produced using, as an ingredient, laurel and barley malted Lucan, with alcohol content 5.8% vol.
- Birra Moretti Sale Di Mare: medium bodied lager with Italian sea salt, 4.8% vol.
- Birra Moretti Zero: non-alcoholic lager, with alcohol content less than 0.05% vol.

=== Special editions ===
- Campioni di Emozioni (2014): on the occasion of the 2014 FIFA World Cup, the company launches a special edition of Birra Moretti: Emotions of Champions. 7 new labels are produced, in which Moretti Baffo 7 interprets famous gestures of elation made by famous Italian footballers.
- La Cucina Stellata (2015).

== Moretti beer and football ==
=== Football trophy ===
From 1997 to 2008, Birra Moretti sponsored the Birra Moretti Trophy, an invitational summer football tournament. The first three editions were held in Udine, the birthplace of the company. Each edition saw the participation of three teams competing for 45 minutes, like many other friendly summer tournaments. After the first three editions, the tournament moved first to the Stadio San Nicola in Bari and then to the Stadio San Paolo in Naples from 2005 to 2008.

=== Moretti stadium ===
Stadio Moretti was built in Udine as a multi-use stadium. The capacity of the stadium was 25,000 spectators. It also hosted speedway events. The stadium was first used as the home of the Udinese Calcio football matches. The venue, however, moved to the Stadio Friuli in 1976. Stadio Moretti was demolished in 1988 and in its place now stands a city park, which was named after the great football player, Alfredo Foni.

== See also ==
- List of companies of Italy
- Heineken brands#Birra Moretti
