= Lake Ariana =

- езеро Ариана (Bulgarian)
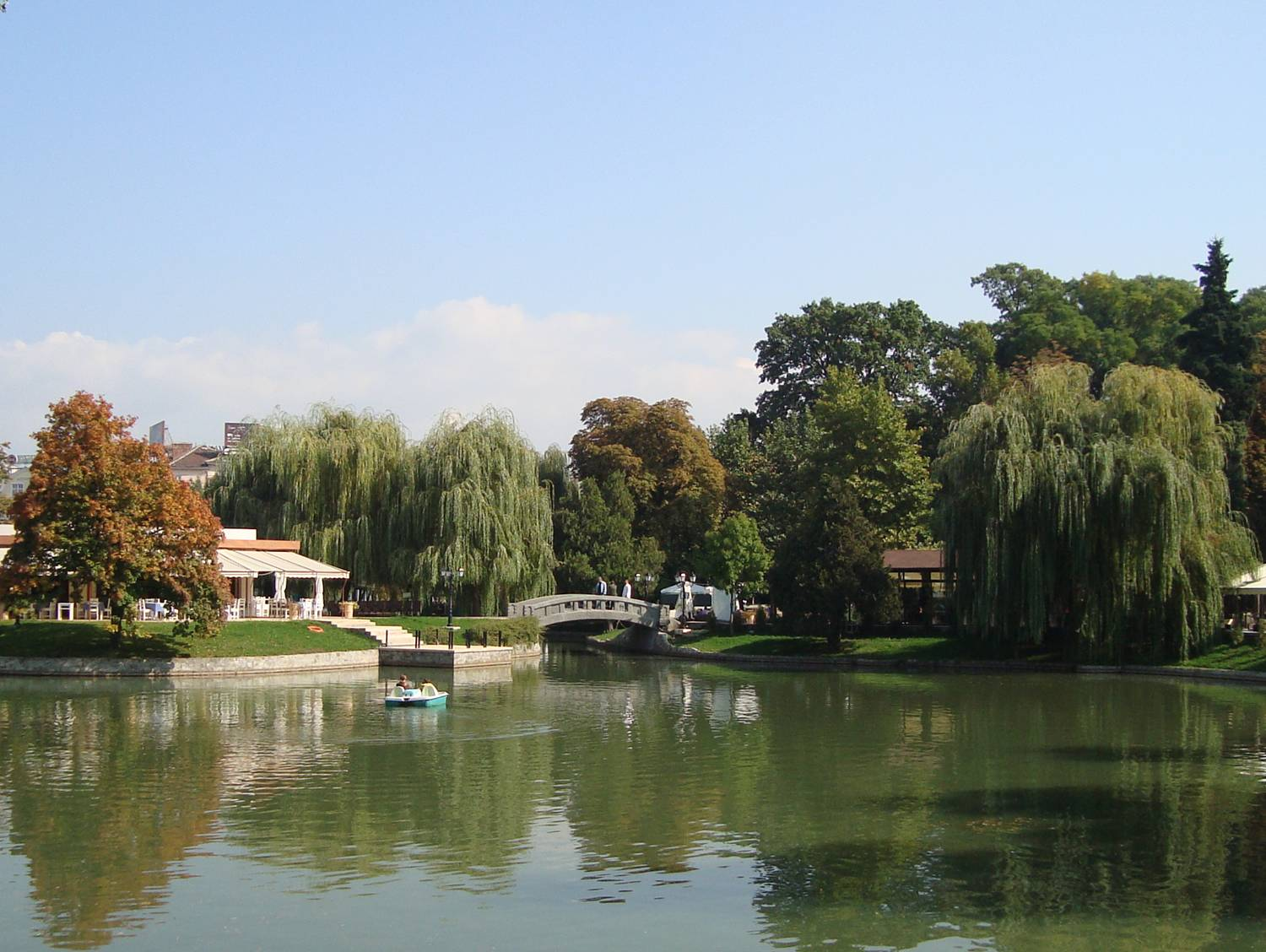

- Location within Sofia
- Location: Knyaz Boris's Garden, Sofia
- Coordinates: 42°41′21.52″N 23°20′11.77″E
- Type: artificial lake
- Basin countries: Bulgaria
- Islands: one

Ariana (Bulgarian: Ариана) is the name of an artificial lake in Knyaz Boris's Garden in Sofia, Bulgaria. It is B-shaped, 175 m long and 75 m wide, with a small island at its narrowest point. It is located at the northernmost corner of the park, in the city centre, between the Eagles' Bridge and the Vasil Levski national stadium.

The lake was constructed in the late 19th century and has since been a focal point for leisurely walks by Sofianites. Water wheels and rowing boats have been a feature, and in winter it was frequently known to freeze over and for people to ice-skate on its surface, nowadays an activity which serviced by several organized ice skating rinks in and around the lake.

== History ==
The construction of the Lake started in 1879, shortly after the country's liberation. Its construction was initially completed in 1898. However, it didn't take the shape it has today until 1904.

The lake came into being after a correction of the bed of the Perlovska River was carried out in the late 19th century, thus most of the water originally came from the nearby river whereas the rest was filled with tap water. The lake was originally with a depth of 1,80 meters, but that was later reduced to 1,20 meters.

Since the lake did not have a name, In the first years of its existence it was simply called "The Lake in Knyaz Boris's Garden". The name Ariana appeared in relation to the brewery that was built near it - Ariana Brewery.

in the winter of 1895, the lake was filled with water to be used for ice skating for the first time, this made it the first ice rink in the city's history.

In these early years, the lake was somewhat swampy. A fact that led the Park's caretaker - Daniel Neff to reconstruct it in 1898. Daniel Neff's planned renovations finished in 1904, enlarging the lake and constructing a small island, connected to the shore by a small, white, stone-arched bridge.

In 1909 the lake began to be rented under certain conditions, those being that the lake would continue allowing boats during the summer and would function as a skate rink during the winter.

In 1929, a casino was built on the small island in the lake. In 1930 a competition for the construction of a pavilion-restaurant was announced, thus a beer hall called "Ariana" was opened on the island. The "Ariana" beer hall was the property of the metropolitan municipality, which provided the businesses for rent under the condition that the tenant of the establishment would maintain the lake, as well as build facilities for the boats, ice skates, and other equipment used there.

In the 30s, "Ariana" Beer Hall faced competition from the Proshekov brothers' "Deep Cellar" (Дълбок Зимник) and Grekov's "Red Crabs", however it appears that it was generally favored by the consumers of the day over them. In 1942 a floating restaurant called "White Sea" ("Бяло море") was opened in the lake.

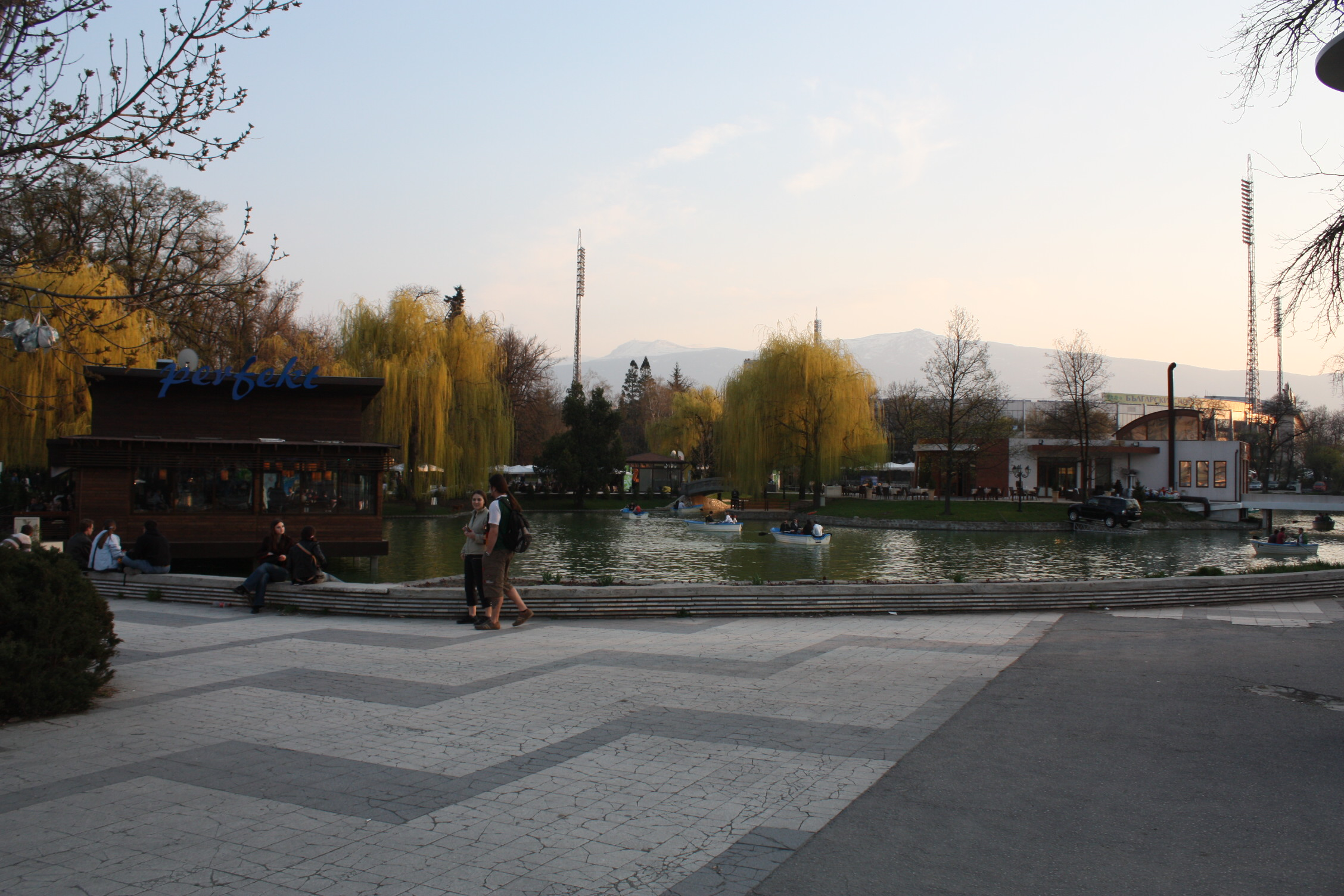
A view of the lake from the north

In 1972, numerous renovations of the lake were undertaken, including the demolition of the old casino and beer hall, and the construction of Musical fountains, with colorful lighting and music.

In 1984, the water was pumped out of the lake due to pending renovations. The lake would remain closed for the next 23 years.

In late 2003 the nearby Ariana brewery was shut down, as its operations moved to Stara Zagora's Zagorka brewery, eventually in 2004, the brewery was demolished.

The renovation of the lake and its surroundings eventually began in 2006 and was completed by 2007. In September 2007, the lake was once again filled with water and on April 11, 2008, the lake was finally reopened by the mayor of the city.
