= Castle of Massafra =

Castle in Apulia, Italy

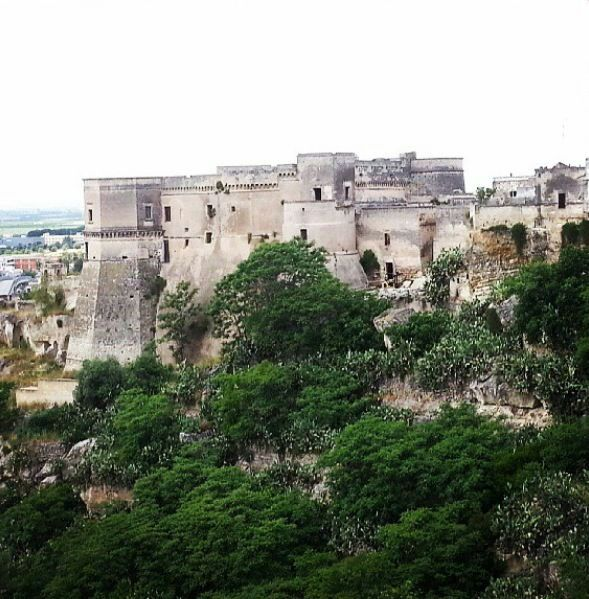
Castle of Massafra

The Castle of Massafra, located in the historic center of Massafra, is a medieval castle overlooking the Pizzo Ravine and San Marco. Its structure and architectural motifs are similar to other castles in Apulia, with four towers arranged in a wishbone and pattern and linked by boundary walls. The oldest towers are circular, while the keep is octagonal in the southeast.

The first definite record of the castle dates back to the year 970. In 1081, a diploma of the castle is owned by Richard Senescalco. With the domination of the Angevins, the castle took on the appearance of a fortress, with crenellated ramparts and towers. It underwent further transformations under the Aragonese, and in the 18th century the Imperial family rebuilt the octagonal tower and the front facing towards the ravine, designed by the architect Mauro Manieri Lecce. The castle was in the possession of many owners before eventually being purchased by the city.

The main entrance, via the rampart, is through a large gate from which you enter the atrium, with a central shaft and a ramp leading to the drawbridge, which are still visible the pulleys. A grand staircase leads to the rooms of the main house. Premises are kept for different uses: stables, barns, armory, prison (corresponding to the towers and the octagonal tower), warehouses, and neviere pecerie (where it is kept for the pitch torches). There was also a chapel dedicated to San Lorenzo. According to popular tradition, there are secret passages and a tunnel connecting the castle to the sea.

In recent years, several restorations were made to the structure. In 1965, the tower was repaired in the south-west, which had collapsed and in 1975 was that the railing collapsed. Around 2000, the east tower was consolidated and restructured the square in front of the Castle, whose works were co-directed the architect Francis Coratella. It has also built a modern elevator. The rooms of the castle are used as the headquarters of the library and the Civic Archaeological Museum of civilization and historical oil and wine.

In 2007, the castle has been celebrated as a symbol of the city, in a stamp dedicated to Massafra, issued on April 13, 2007.
