= Juan Brito =

Juan Brito may refer to:

- Juan Brito (catcher) (born 1977), Dominican former baseball player
- Juan Brito (infielder) (born 2001), Dominican baseball player
- Juan Martínez Brito (born 1958), Cuban discus thrower
