= Desperados (beer) =

Tequila-flavored pale lager beer

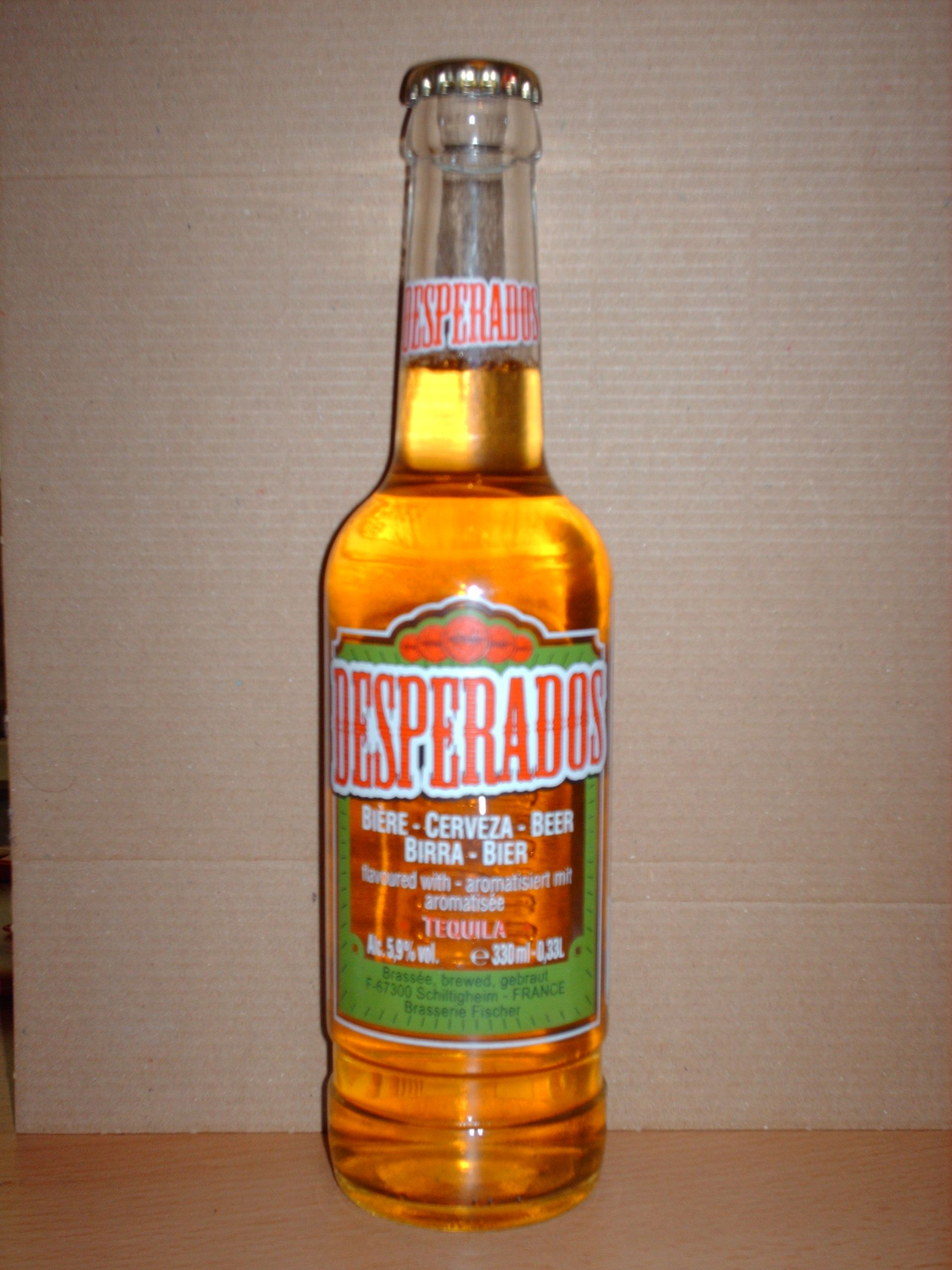
- A 330ml glass bottle of Desperados
- Type: Beer
- Manufacturer: Zlatý Bažant
- Distributor: Heineken N.V.
- Origin: France
- Introduced: 1995; 31 years ago
- Alcohol by volume: 5.9%
- Flavor: Tequila
- Style: Pale lager
- Website: desperados.com

Desperados is an agave spirit flavoured pale lager beer with 5.9% alcohol by volume (ABV) originally created in 1995 and produced by the former French brewing company Fischer Brewery, that has since been produced by the Slovak Zlatý Bažant brewery in Hurbanovo, a Heineken N.V. subsidiary.

Desperados has a 5.9% ABV. The beer is now sold in over fifty countries. The beer was reformulated and cheapened, away from its original recipe using tequila. The new recipe also raised the ABV up from 5.6% to 5.9%.

Desperados' listed ingredients were water, malted barley, glucose syrup, maize, sugar, aromatic compound (agave spirit), citric acid, and hop extract.
