= Britos =

Britos is a surname. Notable people with the surname include:

- Marcela Britos (born 1985), Uruguayan middle-distance runner
- Matías Britos (born 1988), Uruguayan footballer
- Miguel Britos (born 1985), Uruguayan footballer
- Sebastián Britos (born 1988), Uruguayan footballer

== See also ==
- Brito (disambiguation)
