= Jack Britto =

Olympic field hockey player (1926–2013)

Personal information
- Born: 16 August 1924 Karachi, British India
- Died: 16 September 2013 (aged 87) London, England

Jack Britto (16 August 1924 – 16 September 2013) was an Olympic field hockey player. Belonging to Karachi's Goan community, he attended Saint Patrick's High School, Karachi where he was one of the star hockey players. He went on to play for the Pakistan national hockey team, where he played centre half.

Britto had excellent stick work, was a skilful dribbler and one of the best 'goal shooters' in the game. He later represented Pakistan in the Helsinki Olympics of 1952. From 1954 onwards Britto played for Malawi. He lived in Wimbledon, UK until his death in 2013. Britto died in London on 15 September 2013.
