= Astika Brewery =

Bulgarian brewery

- Type: Beer
- Location: Haskovo, Bulgaria

Astika is a brewery making a blond pilsner with an alcohol content of 5% ABV in the city of Haskovo, in southern Bulgaria.

== Overview ==
The brand has a leading position in the Bulgarian premium segment. The brewery draws on the best deep-lying water in Thrace. Astika is characterised by a pale golden hue, a long-lasting white foam, and a taste which balances a slightly honey like flavour with a soft bitterness.

Astika, together with market leader Kamenitza, was one of many Bulgarian breweries owned by InBev. In mid-October 2009, private equity fund CVC Capital Partners bought all of Anheuser–Busch InBev's holdings in Central Europe for €2.23 billion. They renamed the operations StarBev. In 2012, the Molson Coors Brewing Company bought StarBev.
