= Mario Brito =

Dominican baseball player (born 1966)

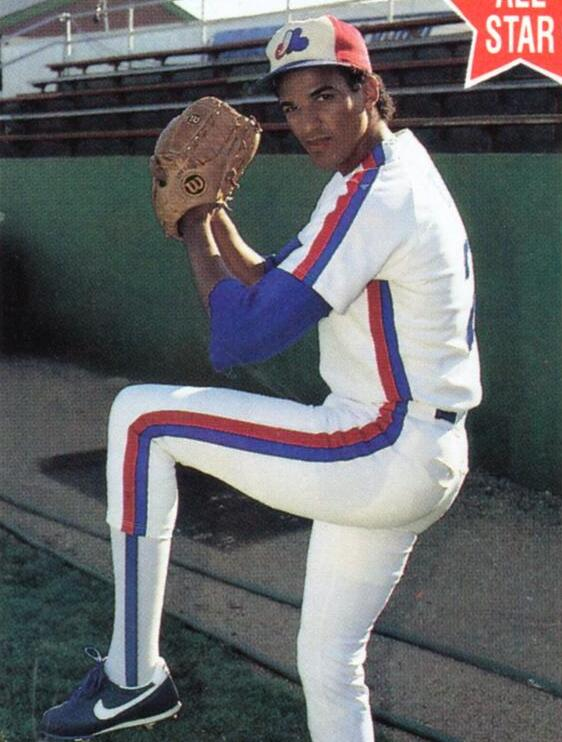
- Brito with the Rockford Expos c. 1988
- Pitcher
- Born: 9 April 1966 (age 60); Bonao, Dominican Republic

Professional debut
- CPBL: 1 April, 1995, for the CTBC Brothers
- NPB: 7 May, 1996, for the Yomiuri Giants

Last appearance
- NPB: 22 October, 1996, for the Yomiuri Giants
- CPBL: 29 July, 1997, for the CTBC Brothers

CPBL statistics
- Win–loss record: 4–10
- Earned run average: 3.78
- Saves: 15

NPB statistics
- Win–loss record: 3–2
- Earned run average: 3.33
- Saves: 19
- Stats at Baseball Reference

Teams
- CTBC Brothers (1995); Yomiuri Giants (1996); CTBC Brothers (1997)

Mario Brito (born 9 April 1966) is a Dominican former professional baseball player. He is part of a handful of players to have played in both Japan and Taiwan, having played for the CTBC Brothers of the Chinese Professional Baseball League and the Yomiuri Giants in the Central League.

== Career ==
Born in Bonao, Dominican Republic, he made his first appearance in baseball as a 20-year-old with the Montreal Expos organization, debuting in the Gulf Coast League with their Expos team. He rose to the A- level with Jamestown the following year before getting to the A-level with Rockford and West Palm Beach. On 23 December 1990, the Expos made a deal with the Chicago White Sox that traded two players away for two players, but they also dealt a player to be named later to go to the Sox in the deal; that player ended up being Brito, with him as one of the players in mind to make the bullpen for the following year (he competed with Melido Perez, who had started the Opening Day game for Chicago the previous year).

However, his 1991 year would be a challenging one. He played winter ball back home to stay fresh for the spring, but he had troubles with his visa clearing so he could play in the States, which meant that he did not report to spring training until March. He started the year in Triple-A (as Perez would be slated to serve as the set-up man the White Sox desired), playing with the Vancouver Canadians. Despite going 44–31 in his first five years in the minors, his time with Vancouver went terribly. He started 13 games while appearing in six others in relief, but he went 0–10 while having a 7.12 ERA; he was eventually sent down to the Birmingham Barons in AA, where he went 2–4. The next three years saw him spend time again on the Triple-A level, although he did not get promoted to the majors (making 65 appearances combined in those years).

After spending the 1994 year with the New Orleans Zephyrs (6-2 in 40 games as a reliever), he moved to the Chinese Professional Baseball League with the Brothers in 1995. He went 3–4 with a 3.16 ERA in 22 games before leaving with a hand injury. He made waves in the winter of that year, having 19 saves while pitching in the Dominican Winter League, and his split-finger fastball garnered attention from the Miami Marlins. He didn't make the roster for the team, instead spending 1996 with the Charlotte Knights, where he played six games with a win before moving on to the Yomiuri Giants (going 3–2 with a 3.33 ERA in 39 appearances). He returned to the Elephants the next year, going 1–6 with 28 appearances and a 4.21 ERA. He took time off before making one more season in baseball, playing with Algodoneros de Unión Laguna in 2000 and going 1–1 in 21 appearances.
