= Kamenitza =

Bulgarian beer company

- Kamenitza 1990s logo

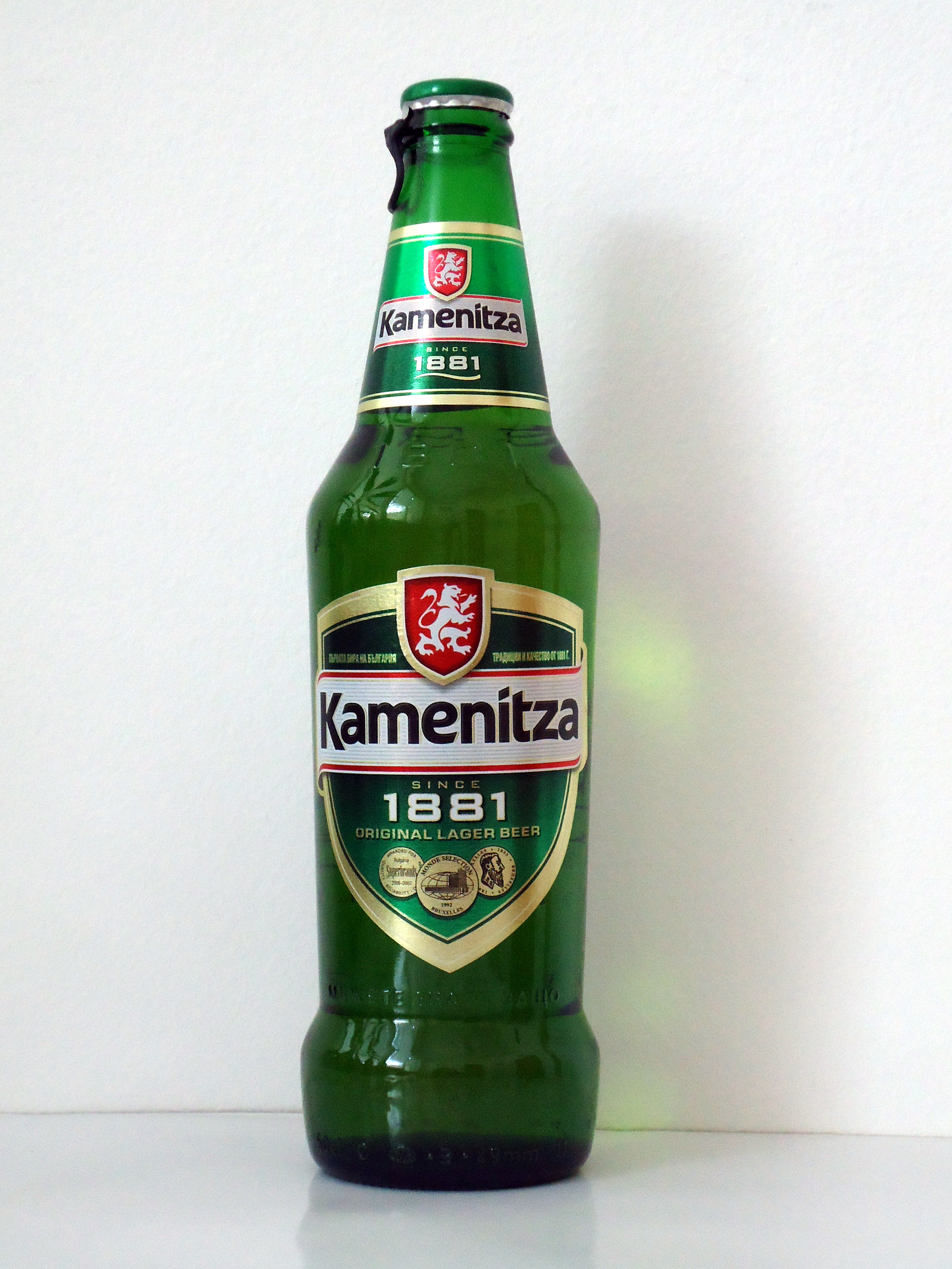
- Interactive map of Kamenitza
- Type: brewery
- Location: Haskovo, Bulgaria
- Opened: 1881
- Annual production volume: 800,000 hectoliters
- Owner: Molson Coors

Kamenitza (Bulgarian: Каменица) is one of the top-selling Bulgarian beer companies based in the city of Haskovo. It was established in 1881 and is currently owned by the multinational Molson Coors. The brewery has a wide variety of lager and dark beers. Its slogan is "Mazhete znayat zashto" which translates to "Men know why."

Kamenitza had an 18% share of the Bulgarian beer market in 2005 according to data from ACNielsen. The company is a sponsor of the Bulgaria national football team.

Kamenitza currently has six brands: Light (4.4% ABV), Dark (6% ABV), non-alcoholic, wheat and Fresh (lemon- and grapefruit-flavoured, 2.1% ABV).

== History ==
In 1881 three Swiss entrepreneurs built a brewery in Plovdiv on a hill called Kamenitza and used the name as their brand. The drink of choice for most Bulgarians at the time was lager, but Kamenitza broke new ground by producing the first dark beer for the market. By the 1890s they won awards at international exhibitions, including Brussels and Chicago.

The communist regime nationalised Kamenitza: first, in 1947, as part of the state-owned Alcoholic Beverages, then in 1952 as part of Vinprom.

The Belgian multinational company InBev bought the Bulgarian breweries Kamenitza, Astika and Burgasko Pivo in 1995 and added Plevensko Pivo in 1997. Beywy 1997 and 2005, InBev invested 86.3 million leva in Bulgaria; in 2005, Kamenitza sold 800,000 hectoliters, making it the best-selling domestic beer.

In mid October 2009, private equity fund CVC Capital Partners bought all of Anheuser–Busch InBev's holdings in Central Europe for €2.23 billion. They renamed the operations StarBev.

As of early April 2012, StarBev is worth approximately €2.65 billion.

Since the early 2010s, Kamenitza bottles have pull-off caps.

== Gallery ==
500 ml Kamenitza can, 2000s logo

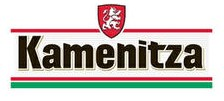
Kamenitza 2010s logo

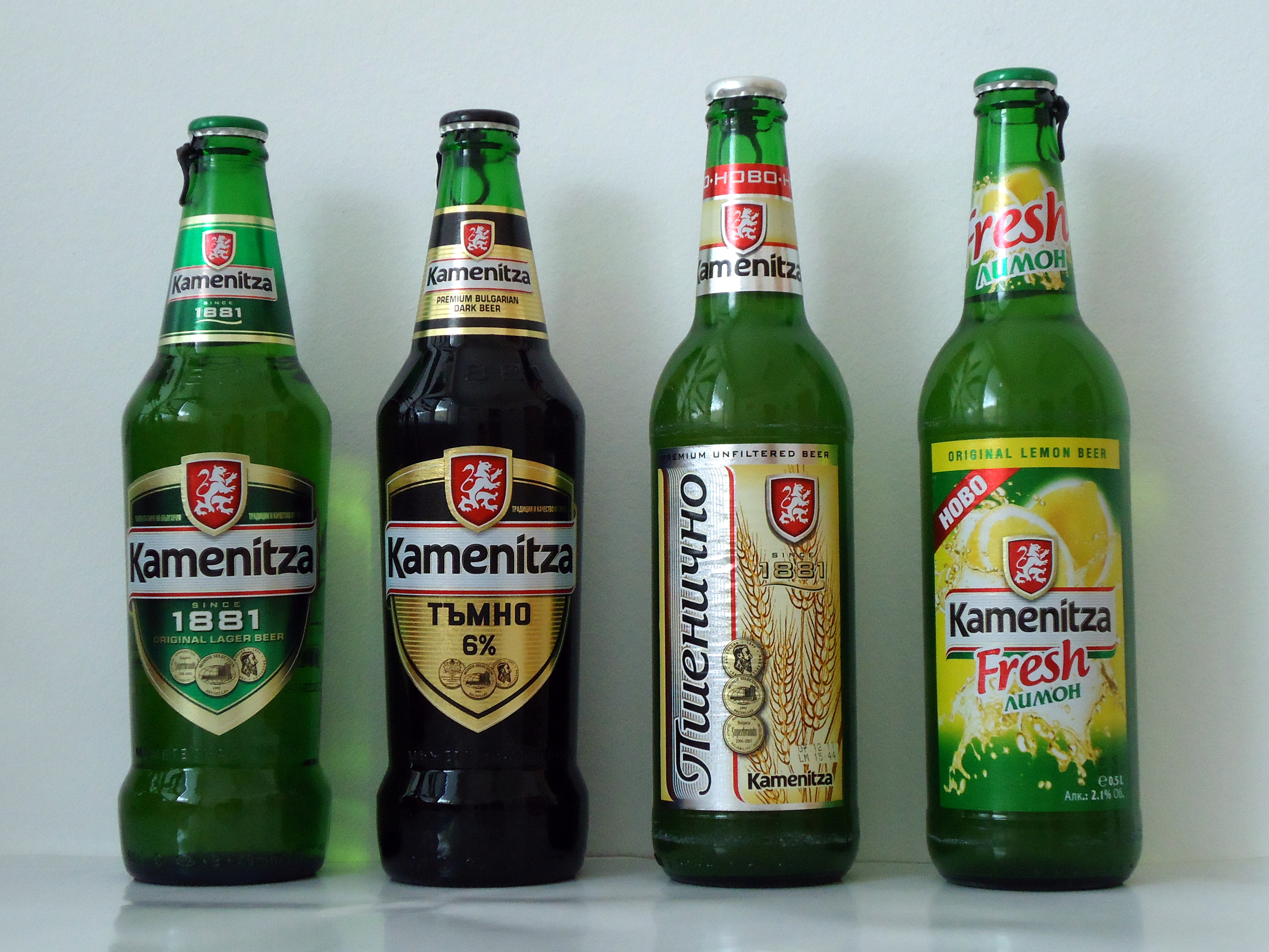
Kamenitza brands, 2010s
