= Alonso Brito =

Cuban musician (born 1950)

- Born: 27 April 1949 (age 77); La Habana, Cuba
- Genres: Latin
- Occupations: Musician, songwriter
- Instrument: Voice
- Years active: 2006–present
- Label: Condor Entertainment
- Members: Alonso Brito; Inocente Alvarez; Rigoberto Lopez; Raul Pineda; Luis Eric Gonzalez; Juliana Munoz; Ariel Moya; Fabrizio Gazzola; Chris McClure; Andy Abad
- Website: www.candorrecords.com/alonsobrito/

Alonso Brito (born 1950) is a Latin, alternative, salsa singer, songwriter born in Havana, Cuba. The Los Angeles Times has compared him to "part Mick Jagger, part Caetano Veloso, and part Desi Arnaz on acid" and as a face for Los Angeles salsa music. During his time in Miami as a socialite he was known to have owned many nightclubs and rubbed shoulders with the likes of Barry Gibb and Donald Fagen.

== Life and music career ==
=== Early life ===
Brito was born in La Havana, Cuba in 1950. At the age of 10, a year after Fidel Castro took power in 1960, Brito was forced to leave due to political and civil unrest.

Moving to Miami at a young age he attended an all-boys Catholic prep school. Somewhat Catholic he still practiced Buddhism as well as Afro-Cuban Santería.

=== Musical rise ===
Brito's first instrument was the drum, which he played in psychedelic rock bands.

He fronted hard-working bands such as Watchdog and Beat Poets, dabbling in styles from smooth jazz, reggae, and British pop to a Latin-tinged style dubbed "troparock."

In Miami, he was known as Dennis Britt; an eclectic musician, nightclub manager, and a night time socialite who rubbed shoulders with the likes of Barry Gibb and Donald Fagen. After separating from his wife he became a fixture of the Miami music scene during the '80s and '90s. "The singer spent his life as a bohemian troubadour, playing in bars, working in various bands and writing songs."

As a respected songwriter he moved to Nashville in the 90s to help write songs for Raul Malo and The Mavericks; contributing to the country band's Grammy-award winning playlists writing for their song "Things I Cannot Change".

Alonso Brito moved to Los Angeles in 2006, signed with Candor Entertainment and is currently working on the record Santo Bueno to be released in 2008.

== Discography ==
Album	Year released
Santo EP	2008
Santo Bueno	2008

== See also ==
- Music of Cuba
- Afro-Cuban
- List of Famous Afro-Latinos
