= Carlos Brito =

Carlos Brito may refer to:

- Carlos Brito (musician) (1891–1943), Ecuadorian musician
- Carlos Brito (footballer, born 1919) (1919–unknown), Portuguese football forward
- Carlos Brito (Portuguese politician) (1933–2026), Portuguese politician
- Carlos Brito (businessman) (born 1960), Brazilian CEO of the brewer Anheuser-Busch InBev
- Carlos Brito (footballer, born 1963), Portuguese football manager and former centre-back
- Carlos Brito (Brazilian politician) (born 1982 or 1983), Brazilian politician
