= Ariana Brewery =

Former brewery in Sofia, Bulgaria

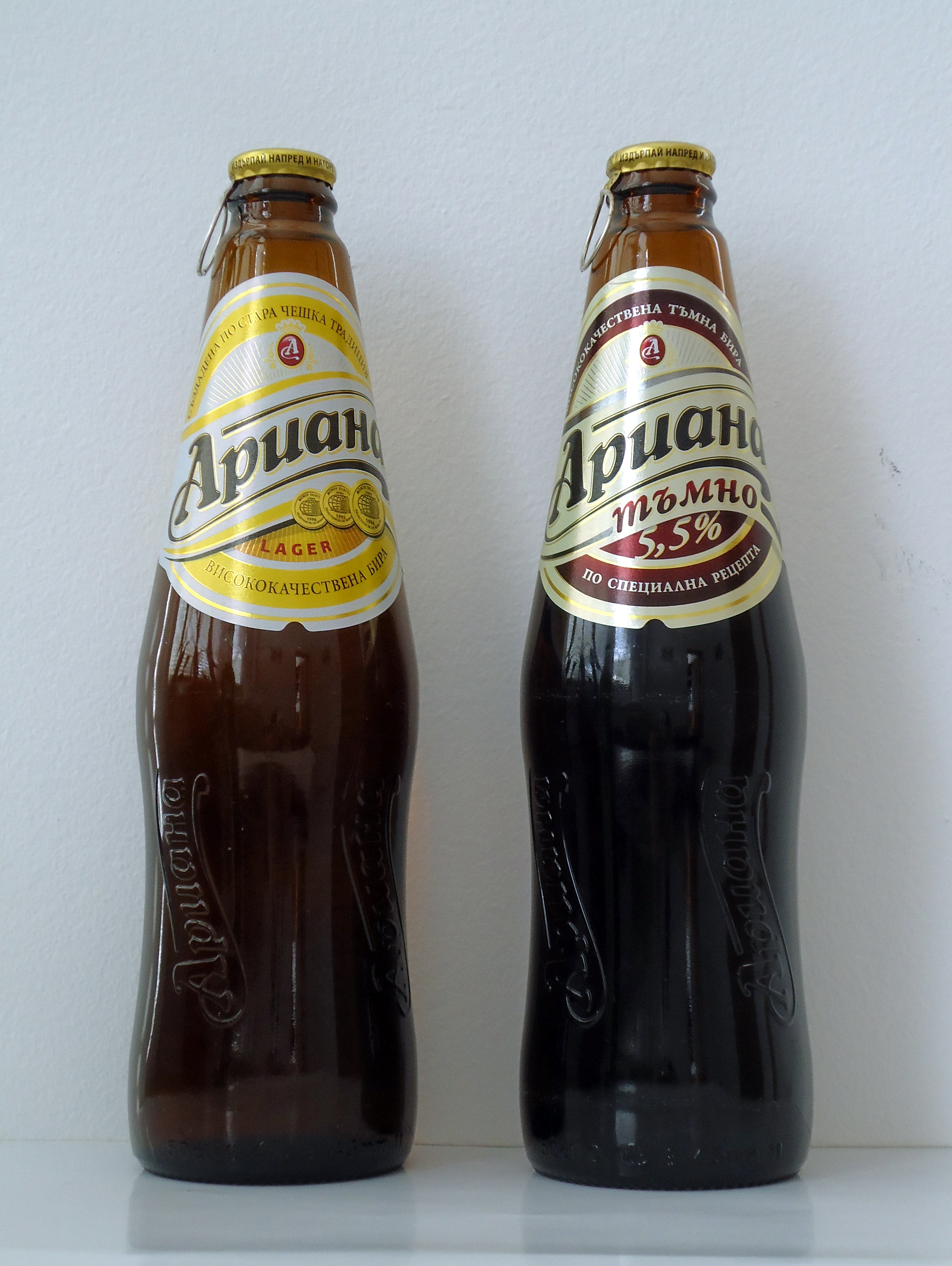
Ariana beer.BG.1

The Ariana Brewery is a defunct company, founded in 1884 in Sofia, Bulgaria under the name Sofia Brewery, changing to Ariana in 1996.

The brewery was bought by Heineken International in 1997, and closed down in 2004, with production of its main brands, Ariana and Stolichno, transferred to the Zagorka Brewery.

== History ==
Founded by the Czech Proshek brothers in 1884, the Sofia brewery began producing Proshekovo Pivo using Czech brewing practices, leading the beer to be awarded a gold medal at Antwerp in 1891. (Before establishing themselves in central Sofia, the brothers had originally rented a smaller brewery in the nearby village of Knyazhevo.)

In 1947, the brewery was nationalized by the communist regime and renamed Vitosha, and the beer was eventually renamed Sofiisko Pivo. A second factory was built in the nearby village of Gorublyane, and in 1978 the brewery in central Sofia was closed. The company changed its name to Ariana Brewery in 1996.

In 1997, Ariana was bought out by Heineken, and in 2004 production was moved to the Zagorka brewery. Ariana accounts for 50% of the total sales of Zagorka AD.

The brewery shares its name with the nearby Lake Ariana.
