= Massafra =

Massafra Griko: Messaphros
- Comune
- Città di Massafra
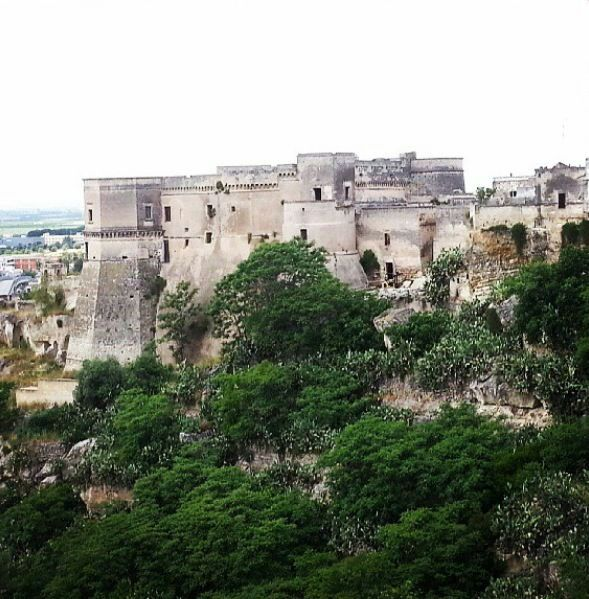
- Castle of Massafra

- Flag Coat of arms

- Location within Italy Location within Apulia
- Coordinates: 40°35′N 17°7′E
- Country: Italy
- Region: Apulia
- Province: Taranto (TA)
- Frazioni: Cernera, Chiatona, Citignano, Marina di Ferrara

Government
  - Mayor: Giancarla Zaccaro

Area
  - Total: 125 km^{2} (48 sq mi)
- Elevation: 110 m (360 ft)

Population (31 October 2017)
  - Total: 32,872
  - Density: 263/km^{2} (681/sq mi)
- Demonym: Massafresi
- Time zone: UTC+1 (CET)
  - Summer (DST): UTC+2 (CEST)
- Postal code: 74016
- Dialing code: 099
- Website: Official website

Massafra is a city and comune in the province of Taranto in the Apulia region of southeast Italy.

== History ==
According to some hypotheses, Massafra was founded in the 5th century by refugees from the Roman province of Africa, invaded by the Vandals. The first historical mention of the city dates however from the 10th century, when it was a Lombard gastaldate.

After the Norman conquest of southern Italy, it was given to a nephew of Robert Guiscard, who fortified it and restored the castle. Later it was part of the Principality of Taranto, to which, as a free town, it belonged until 1463. In 1484 it was assigned to Antonio Piscitello. In 1497 it was sacked by the troops of Charles VIII of France, and the fief went to Artusio Pappacoda, whose family held it for a century and a half. They were succeeded by the Carmignano and the Imperiale.

== Main sights ==
- Castle of Massafra, known from 970
- Mother Church (16th century)
- Gravina di San Marco (gravine)
- Natural reserves of Monte Sant'Elia and Stornara
- Numerous rock settlements, from the Neolithic to the High Middle Ages

== Notable people ==
- Kid Yugi (Rapper)
