= Stolichno =

Bulgarian bock beer

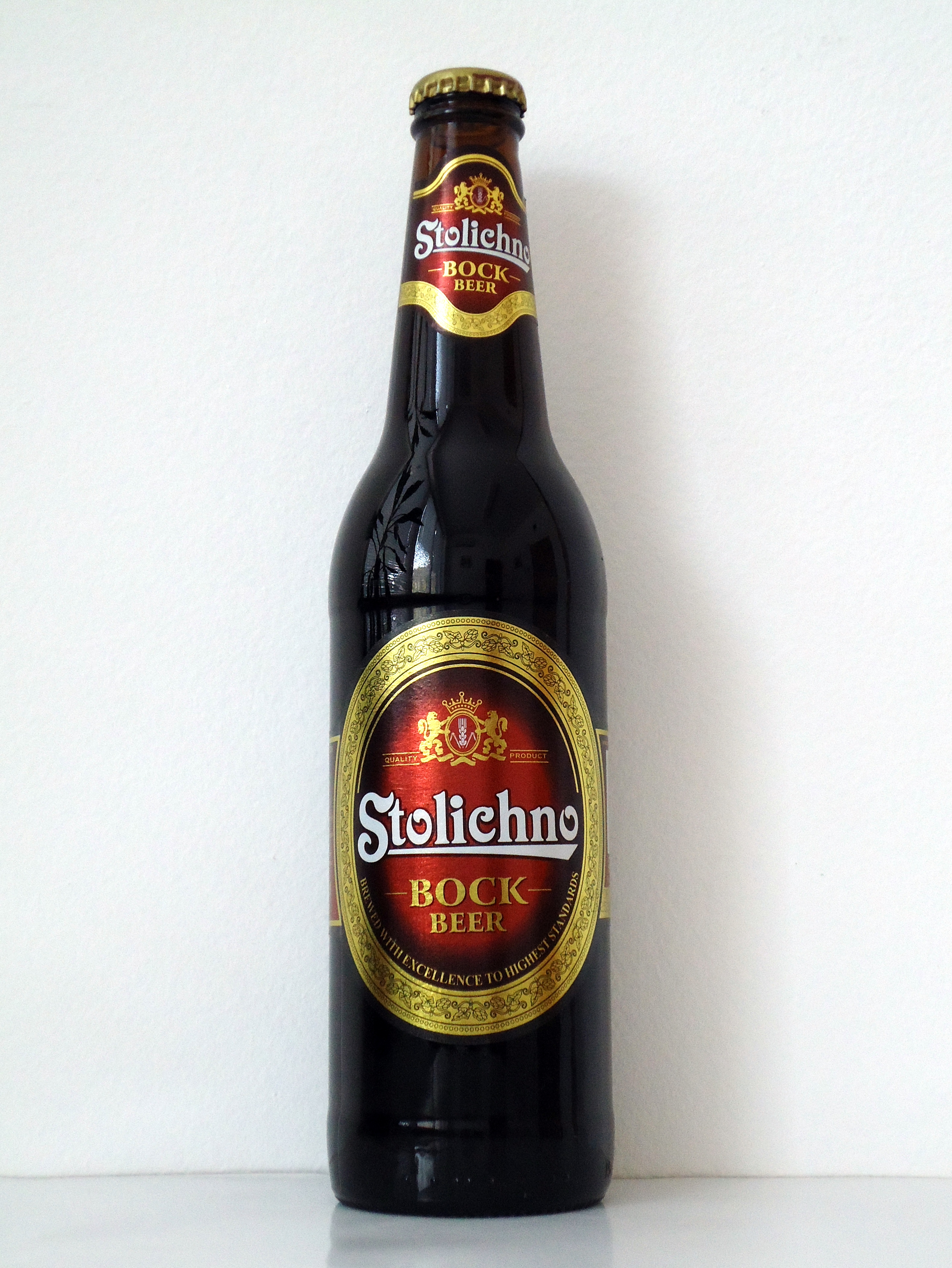
Stolichno Bock Beer

Stolichno is a Bulgarian bock beer (Bulgarian: Столично пиво) produced by the Zagorka Brewery since 2004.

The beer was originally brewed at Sofia's Ariana Brewery (hence the name, which literally means "of the capital city"). It is a strong beer with an ABV of 6.5%.
