= Fischer Brewery =

Brewery in Schiltigheim, France

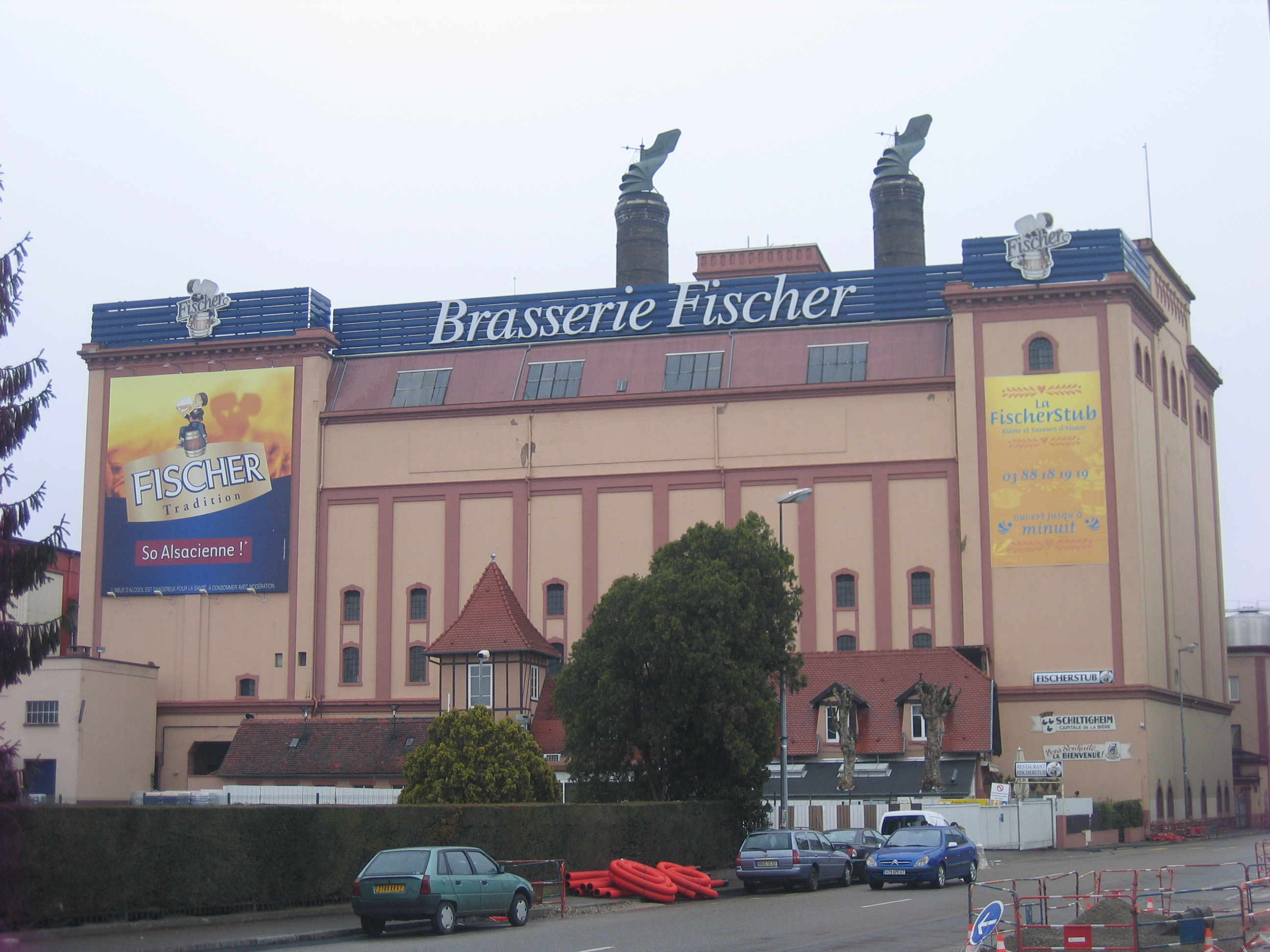
Fischer brewery at the south entrance of Schiltigheim

Fischer was a brewery in Schiltigheim, France. Heineken took over ownership in 1996 and closed the brewery in 2009.

== History ==
The Fischer brewery was founded in 1821 in Strasbourg, in the Alsace region in France, and moved to Schiltigheim in 1854, because of the water quality there. In 1922, they took over the neighbouring Adelshoffen brewery and became "Groupe Pêcheur" (the French translation of the German "Fischer"). "Groupe Pêcheur" was in turn taken over by Heineken in 1996.

In 2008 Heineken announced that it would close the brewery by the end of 2009 and transfer production to the l'Espérance (en: hope) brewery, also in Schiltigheim.

== Products ==
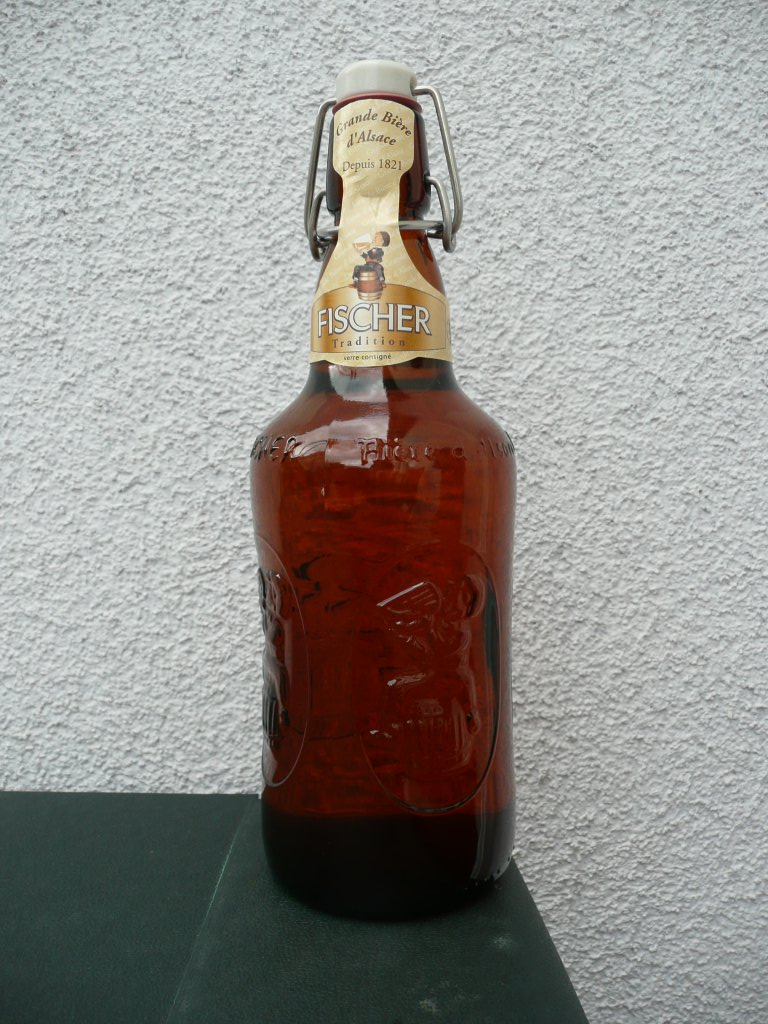
A bottle of "Fischer Tradition"

Fischer produced Desperados, a pale lager flavored with tequila. The firm also brewed Desperados Mas. This is 3% ABV and also flavoured with tequila.

== See also ==
- Beer in France
