= Ariana (beer) =

Bulgarian beer brand

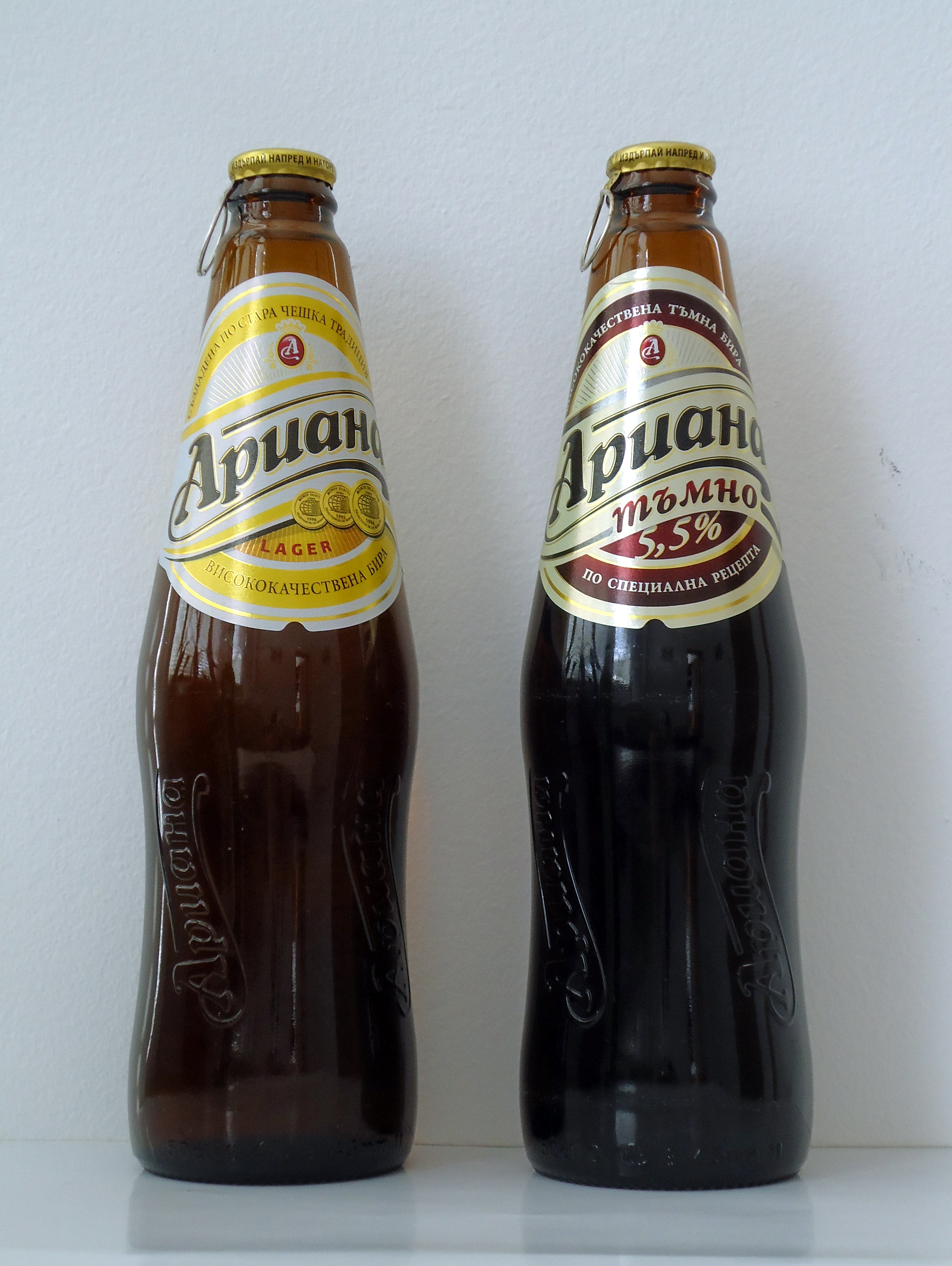
Ariana - lager and bock, 2010s bottles

Ariana is a Bulgarian beer brand, produced by the Zagorka Brewery since 2004. The company was established in 1884, and for most of its history brewed at the Ariana Brewery in central Sofia. It was bought by Heineken in 1997 and currently has four brands – Ariana Light (5% ABV), Ariana Dark (5.5% ABV), and two citrus-flavoured brands available only in summer – Ariana Radler lemon, and grapefruit (1.8% ABV).
