= Ariadna (disambiguation) =

Ariadna is a genus of tube-dwelling spider.

== People ==
- Ariadna Cabrol (born 1982), a Spanish actress and model
- Ariadna Chasovnikova (1918/19–1988), a Kazakh-Soviet politician
- Ariadna Gil (born 1969), a Spanish actress
- Ariadna Gutiérrez (born 1993), a Colombian actress and model
- Ariadna Gutiérrez (cyclist) (born 1991), a Mexican professional racing cyclist
- Ariadna Medina (born 1972), a Mexican synchronized swimmer
- Ariadna Nevado (born 2000), a Spanish professional racing cyclist
- Ariadna Romero (born 1986), a Cuban model and actress
- Ariadna Scriabina (1905–1944), a Russian poet and activist of the French Resistance
- Ariadna Shengelaya (born 1937), a Soviet actress
- Ariadna Sintes (born 1986), a Cuban-Spanish actress
- Ariadna Tudel Cuberes (born 1978), an Andorran road cyclist and ski mountaineer
- Ariadna Tyrkova-Williams (1869–1962), a politician, journalist, writer and feminist
- Ariadne Welter (1930–1998), a Mexican movie actress
- Thalía (Ariadna Thalía Sodi Miranda, born 1971), a Mexican singer and entrepreneur

== Other uses ==
- AMSD Ariadna, a Russian web browser
- Ariadna abandonada, a sculpture by Fidencio Lucano Nava

== See also ==
- Ariadne (disambiguation)
- Ariana (disambiguation)
- Arianna (disambiguation)
- Ariane (disambiguation)
