= Ariadne (disambiguation) =

Ariadne was a figure in Greek mythology.

Ariadne may also refer to:

== People and characters ==
- Ariadne (given name), a list of people and fictional characters with the name
- Ariadne (empress) (c. 450 – 515), Eastern Roman empress
- Ariadne (writer), the pseudonym of a "Young Lady" who wrote the play She Ventures and He Wins

== Places ==
- 43 Ariadne, the second-largest member of the Flora asteroid family
  - Ariadne family, the Ariadnes, the asteroid family that 43 Ariadne belongs to, also called the Flora family
- Ariadnes Colles (Ariadne Hills), Eridania, Mars; a range of hills on planet Mars
- Lacus Ariadnes (Lake Ariadne), a basin of Eridania Lake, a lakebed on planet Mars; see Lakes on Mars
- Ariadne (crater), a crater on Venus

== Arts, entertainment, media ==
- Sleeping Ariadne, a Roman sculpture in the Vatican Museums
- Ariadne (Greuze painting), an 1804 painting by Jean-Baptiste Greuze
- Ariadne (Giorgio de Chirico painting), a 1913 painting by Italian painter Giorgio de Chirico
- Ariadne: A Social Art Network, a collaborative art group founded by Suzanne Lacy and Leslie Labowitz-Starus
- "Ariadne", an episode of the 2019 TV series Russian Doll

=== Literature ===
- Ariadne (archive), the department of the Austrian National Library devoted to women's and gender studies
- Ariadne (poem), a 1932 epic by F. L. Lucas
- Ariadne (short story), a 1895 story by Anton Chekhov
- Ariadne (web magazine), an Information Sciences journal published by Loughborough University

=== Music ===
- Ariadne (EP), a 2004 extended play released by The Clientele
- Ariadne musica, a collection of organ music by Johann Caspar Ferdinand Fischer

=== Stage ===
- Ariadne (ballet), 1878, with Marius Petipa and Julius Reisinger
- Ariadne auf Naxos, 1912 opera by Richard Strauss

== Taxonomy ==
- Ariadne (butterfly), a genus of nymphalid butterflies
  - Ariadne ariadne (A. ariadne), a species of butterfly
- Ariadne, a genus of flowering plants, synonym of Mazaea
- Scinax ariadne, a species of frog endemic to Brazil

== Transport and vehicular ==
- GWR Ariadne Class, a broad gauge 0-6-0 steam locomotive class from Great Western Railroad
- Ariadne (ship), the name of several ships
  - HMS Ariadne, a British Royal Navy shipname and list of ships with that name
- Ariadne-class corvette, a German Imperial Navy class of steam screw corvette
- Ariadne-class frigate, a British Royal Navy class of sail frigate; see List of frigate classes of the Royal Navy

== Other uses ==
- Ariadne (drug) (also stylized ARIADNE), a psychoactive drug
- Ariadne (software) (also stylized ARIADNE), an Educational Content Management System
- Ariadne Labs, a U.S. health systems development center
- Ariadnet (Ariadne Network), Programme Ariadne, a Greek research computer network
- Ariadne's thread (logic), an algorithm in puzzle-solving
- Ariadne, name in Greece for the January 2017 European cold wave

== See also ==
- Ariadne Classic, an Australian women's tennis tournament
- Ariadna (disambiguation)
- Ariana (disambiguation)
- Ariane (disambiguation)
- Arianna (disambiguation)
- Bacchus and Ariadne (disambiguation)
