= Ariadne (ship) =

Several vessels have been named Ariadne for Ariadne, a goddess in Greek mythology.

== Mercantile ==
- Ariadne (1794 ship) was launched at Whitby. Two years later a new owner shifted her registry to London. She then made one voyage for the British East India Company. On her return she sailed on between England and the West Indies. She is last listed in 1811.
- Ariadne (1795 ship) was built in 1795 at Newbury, Massachusetts, probably under another name. She in 1801 became a Liverpool-based slave ship in the triangular trade in enslaved people. She made two voyages transporting enslaved people before a French, and later a Dutch privateer, captured her in 1804 while she was acquiring captives on her third voyage. However, a Liverpool-based vessel recaptured her. Then in 1806, a French privateer captured her and took her into Guadeloupe while Ariadne was on her fourth voyage transporting captives.
- MS Ariadne (1966), launched as MS Tor Hollandia, a ferry in service 1975–99
- MS Ariadne (2002), later MS Moby Tommy, a ferry in service 2002–06
- Ariadne (1996), launched Ferry Himuka, renamed Ariadne in 2006

== Naval ==
- SMS Ariadne (1871), a German steam corvette, a Ariadne-class corvette of the Imperial German Navy, launched 1871
- SMS Ariadne, a German light cruiser, a Gazelle-class cruiser of the Imperial German Navy, launched in 1900
- German anti-aircraft cruiser Ariadne, a WW2 German ship captured from the Dutch
- HMS Ariadne, the name of several ships of the Royal Navy
- INS Ariadne (1839), a British East India Company paddle steamer

== See also ==
- Ariadne-class corvette, a Prussian Navy class of screw corvette steamship
- Ariadne-class frigate, a British Royal Navy class of sailing frigate; see List of frigate classes of the Royal Navy
- Ariadne (disambiguation)
