= Ariane =

Ariane may refer to:

- Ariana (name), also Ariane, Arianne

== Arts and media ==
- Ariane (Martinů), an opera by Bohuslav Martinů, first performed 1961
- Ariane (Massenet), an opera by Jules Massenet, first performed 1906
- Ariane (film), a 1931 German film directed by Paul Czinner
- Les Films Ariane, a former French film production company
- Ariane, a play by Thomas Corneille (1625–1709)
- Ariane, the name of the 1957 film Love in the Afternoon in French speaking markets

== Transportation ==
- Simca Ariane, a French car by Simca, 1957–1963
- Ariane (automobile), a French car by Automobiles Ariane, 1907
- French ship Ariane, the name of several French ships
- Ariane (rocket family), European rockets operated by Arianespace

== Other uses ==
- Ariane (apple), an apple cultivar
- 1225 Ariane, an asteroid
- Ariane, a brand name of the antiandrogen rezvilutamide
- Tour Ariane (Ariane Tower), an office building west of Paris

== See also ==
- Ariadna (disambiguation)
- Ariadne (disambiguation)
- Arianna (disambiguation)
- Ariana (disambiguation)
- Ariano (disambiguation)
