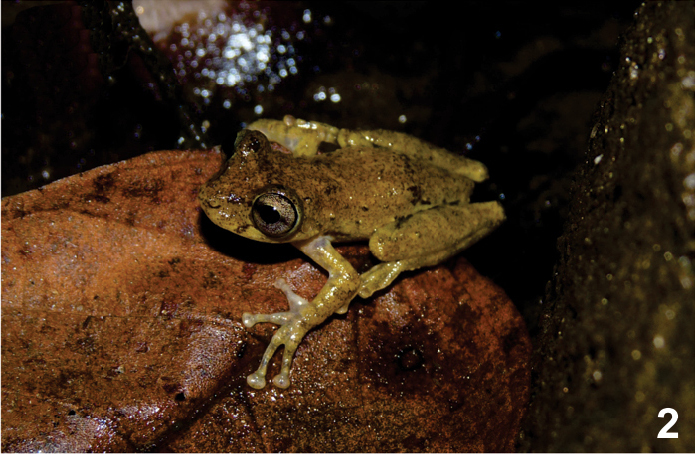

Conservation status
- Least Concern (IUCN 3.1)

Scientific classification
- Kingdom: Animalia
- Phylum: Chordata
- Class: Amphibia
- Order: Anura
- Family: Hylidae
- Genus: Ololygon
- Species: O. angrensis

Binomial name
- Ololygon angrensis (B. Lutz, 1973)

Synonyms
- Hyla catharinae angrensis Lutz, 1973; Hyla angrensis Pombal & Gordo, 1991; Scinax angrensis Pombal & Bastos, 1996

= Ololygon angrensis =

Species of frog

Ololygon angrensis is a species of frog in the family Hylidae endemic to Brazil. Its natural habitats are subtropical or tropical moist lowland forests, rivers, and ponds. It is threatened by habitat loss.
