= Ololygon flavoguttata =

Conservation status
- Least Concern (IUCN 3.1)

Scientific classification
- Kingdom: Animalia
- Phylum: Chordata
- Class: Amphibia
- Order: Anura
- Family: Hylidae
- Genus: Ololygon
- Species: O. flavoguttata

Binomial name
- Ololygon flavoguttata (A. Lutz & B. Lutz, 1939)

Synonyms
- Scinax flavoguttatus (Lutz and Lutz, 1939)

Species of frog

Ololygon flavoguttata is a species of frog in the family Hylidae. It is endemic to Brazil. Its natural habitats are subtropical or tropical moist lowland forests, subtropical or tropical moist montane forests, and rivers. It is threatened by habitat loss.
