= HMS Ariadne =

Eight ships of the Royal Navy have borne the name HMS Ariadne, after the Greek goddess:

- HMS Ariadne (1776) was a 20-gun post ship launched in 1776. She faced USS Alfred in 1778 and forced Alfred's surrender. Ariadne was rebuilt in 1792 to carry 24 guns, and was sold in 1814.
- HMS Ariadne (1805) was an advice boat purchased in 1805. She was renamed HMS Dove later that year, and HMS Flight in 1806. She foundered in 1806.
- HMS Ariadne (1816) was another 20-gun post ship launched in 1816. She was converted into a coal hulk in 1837 and was sold in 1841.
- HMS Ariadne (1839) was an Indian iron paddle sloop launched in 1839 that foundered in 1842.
- HMS Ariadne (1859) was a wooden screw frigate launched in 1859. She became part of the shore establishment HMS Vernon in 1884, and was renamed HMS Actaeon in 1905. She was finally sold in 1922.
- HMS Ariadne (1898) was a Diadem-class cruiser launched in 1898, converted to a minelayer in 1917 and torpedoed and sunk later that year.
- HMS Ariadne (M65) was an Abdiel-class minelayer launched in 1943 and sold for breaking up in 1965.
- HMS Ariadne (F72) was a Leander-class frigate launched in 1971. She was sold to the Chilean Navy in 1992, and renamed General Baquedano. She was decommissioned in 1998 and sunk as a target in 2004.

== See also ==
- Ariadne (ship), other ships with this name
- INS Ariadne (1839) was a flat-bottomed iron paddle steamer built in England for the Indian Navy of the Bombay Government of the British East India Company. She was shipped to India in pieces and assembled at the Bombay Dockyard in 1840. She sailed from India to join the British fleet off Shanghai, China, during the First Opium War but was damaged and later foundered on 23 June 1842.
