= Arianna =

Arianna may refer to:

- Ariana (name), a given name

== Opera ==
- L'Arianna, (English: Arianna), by Monteverdi, first performed 1608
- Arianna (Marcello), by Benedetto Marcello, first concert performance 1727
- Arianna in Creta, by Handel, first performed 1734
- Arianna (Goehr), by Alexander Goehr, first performed 1995

== Other uses ==
- Arianna (film), 2015
- ARIANNA Experiment, a proposed neutrino detector at the Ross Ice Shelf, Antarctica
- Arianna (yacht), a 2012 luxury megayacht

== See also ==
- Ariana (disambiguation)
- Ariane (disambiguation)
- Ariadne (disambiguation)
- Aria (region), sometimes confused with Ariana
- Aryana (TV series)
