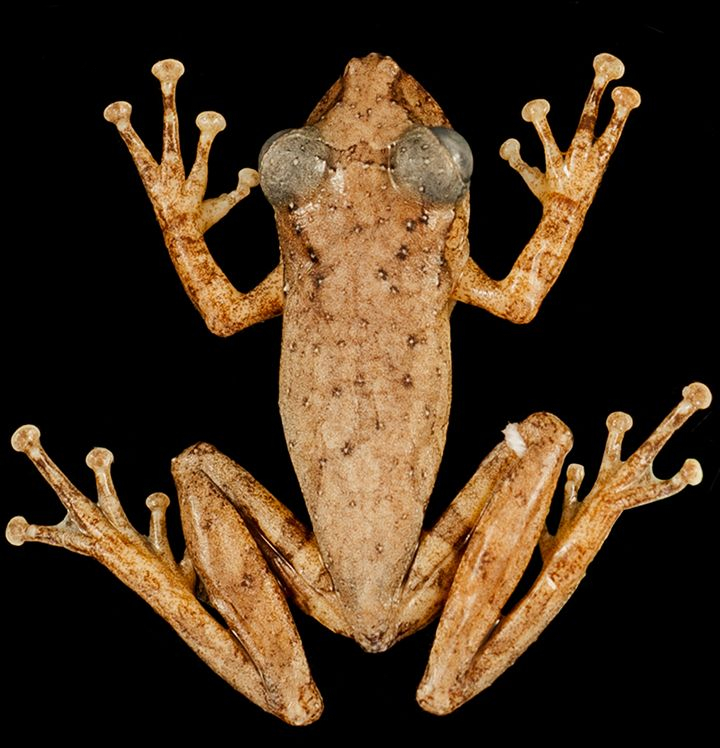

Conservation status
- Near Threatened (IUCN 3.1)

Scientific classification
- Kingdom: Animalia
- Phylum: Chordata
- Class: Amphibia
- Order: Anura
- Family: Hylidae
- Genus: Ololygon
- Species: O. trapicheiroi

Binomial name
- Ololygon trapicheiroi (A. Lutz and B. Lutz, 1954)

Synonyms
- Scinax trapicheiroi (B. Lutz, 1954)

= Ololygon trapicheiroi =

Species of frog

Ololygon trapicheiroi is a species of frog in the family Hylidae. It is endemic to Brazil. Its natural habitats are subtropical or tropical moist lowland forests and rivers. It is threatened by habitat loss.
