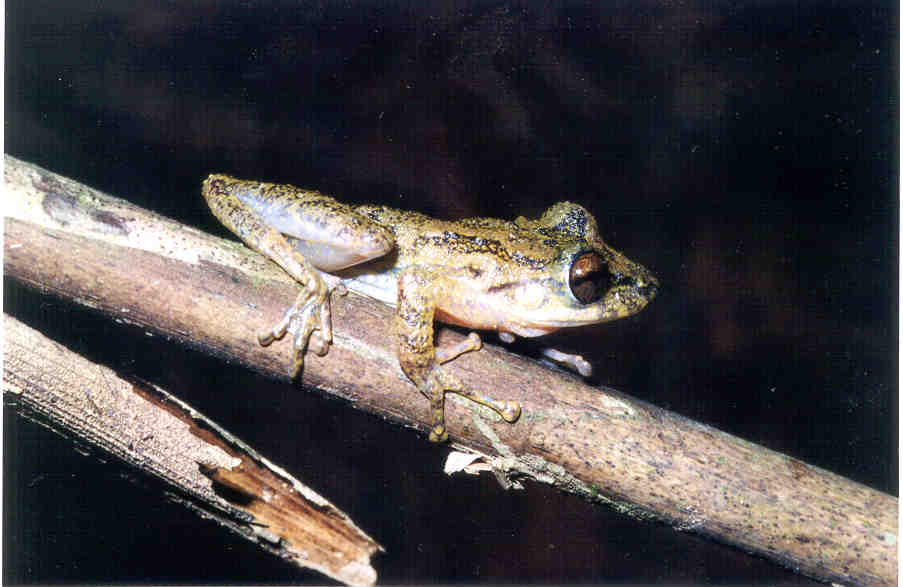

Conservation status
- Least Concern (IUCN 3.1)

Scientific classification
- Kingdom: Animalia
- Phylum: Chordata
- Class: Amphibia
- Order: Anura
- Family: Hylidae
- Genus: Ololygon
- Species: O. longilinea

Binomial name
- Ololygon longilinea (Lutz, 1968)

Synonyms
- Scinax longilineus (Lutz, 1968)

= Ololygon longilinea =

Species of frog

Ololygon longilinea is a species of frog in the family Hylidae. It is endemic to Brazil. Its natural habitats are subtropical or tropical moist lowland forests, subtropical or tropical moist montane forests, and rivers. It is threatened by habitat loss.
