= Ololygon humilis =

Conservation status
- Least Concern (IUCN 3.1)

Scientific classification
- Kingdom: Animalia
- Phylum: Chordata
- Class: Amphibia
- Order: Anura
- Family: Hylidae
- Genus: Ololygon
- Species: O. humilis

Binomial name
- Ololygon humilis (A. Lutz and B. Lutz, 1954)

Synonyms
- Scinax humilis A. Lutz and B. Lutz, 1954; Hyla humilis (A. Lutz and B. Lutz, 1954)

Species of frog

Ololygon humilis, also known as the Rio Babi snouted treefrog, is a species of frog in the family Hylidae. It is endemic to the coastal lowlands of Rio de Janeiro in southeastern Brazil, as well as Espírito Santo and São Paulo.

Its natural habitats are subtropical or tropical moist lowland forests, subtropical or tropical moist montane forests, swamps, intermittent freshwater marshes, and heavily degraded former forests, from 0 to 1,200 metres (0 to 3,937 ft) above sea level.

The International Union for Conservation of Nature has assessed Ololygon humilis to be a least-concern species as of 2023, although habitat loss from urban development and land use change poses a minor, localized threat to its survival in some parts of its range.
