= Ololygon alcatraz =

Conservation status
- Vulnerable (IUCN 3.1)

Scientific classification
- Kingdom: Animalia
- Phylum: Chordata
- Class: Amphibia
- Order: Anura
- Family: Hylidae
- Genus: Ololygon
- Species: O. alcatraz

Binomial name
- Ololygon alcatraz (B. Lutz, 1973)

Synonyms
- Hyla catharinae alcatraz Lutz, 1973; Scinax alcatraz (Lutz, 1973)

Species of frog

Ololygon alcatraz, commonly called the Alcatraz snouted treefrog, is a species of frog in the family Hylidae. It is endemic to Ilha dos Alcatrazes, an island off the coast of São Paulo state, Brazil.

Ololygon alcatraz occurs in primary and secondary forest as well as degraded forest. It completes its entire life cycle (including tadpoles) in the cups formed by the leaves of bromeliads.

The species was formerly threatened by fires resulting from munitions testing done by the Brazilian Navy on Ilha dos Alcatrazes. These tests have since ceased, due to environmental concerns regarding the island's endemic species. However, O. alcatraz is still considered threatened by the effects of climate change.
