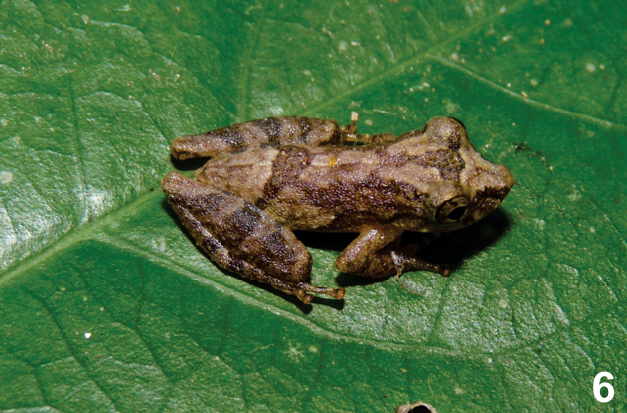

Conservation status
- Least Concern (IUCN 3.1)

Scientific classification
- Kingdom: Animalia
- Phylum: Chordata
- Class: Amphibia
- Order: Anura
- Family: Hylidae
- Genus: Ololygon
- Species: O. perpusilla

Binomial name
- Ololygon perpusilla (A. Lutz & B. Lutz, 1939)

Synonyms
- Scinax perpusillus (Lutz and Lutz, 1939)

= Ololygon perpusilla =

Species of frog

Ololygon perpusilla is a species of frog in the family Hylidae. It is endemic to Brazil. Its natural habitats are subtropical or tropical moist lowland forests and subtropical or tropical moist shrubland. It is threatened by habitat loss.
