= Ololygon obtriangulata =

Conservation status
- Least Concern (IUCN 3.1)

Scientific classification
- Kingdom: Animalia
- Phylum: Chordata
- Class: Amphibia
- Order: Anura
- Family: Hylidae
- Genus: Ololygon
- Species: O. obtriangulata

Binomial name
- Ololygon obtriangulata (B. Lutz, 1973)

Synonyms
- Scinax obtriangulatus (B. Lutz, 1973)

Species of frog

Ololygon obtriangulata is a species of frog in the family Hylidae. It is endemic to Brazil. Its natural habitats are subtropical or tropical moist lowland forests, subtropical or tropical moist montane forests, and rivers. It is threatened by habitat loss.
