= Ololygon v-signata =

Conservation status
- Least Concern (IUCN 3.1)

Scientific classification
- Kingdom: Animalia
- Phylum: Chordata
- Class: Amphibia
- Order: Anura
- Family: Hylidae
- Genus: Ololygon
- Species: O. v-signata

Binomial name
- Ololygon v-signata (B. Lutz, 1968)

Synonyms
- Scinax v-signatus (B. Lutz, 1968)

Species of frog

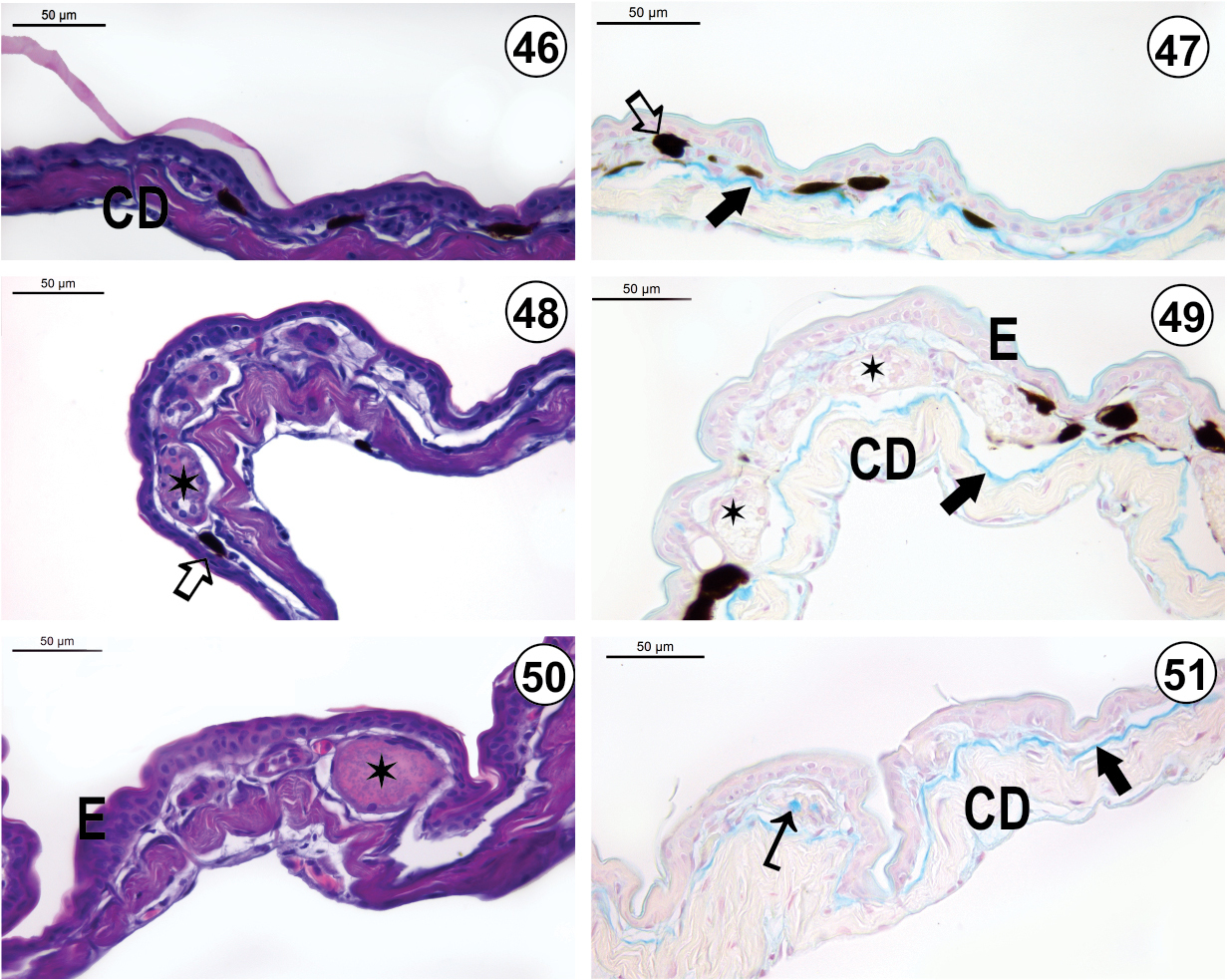
Shows a Light micrograph of the integument of Ololygon v-signals

Ololygon v-signata is a species of frog in the family Hylidae. It is endemic to Brazil. Its natural habitats are subtropical or tropical moist lowland forests and subtropical or tropical moist montane forests. It is threatened by habitat loss.
