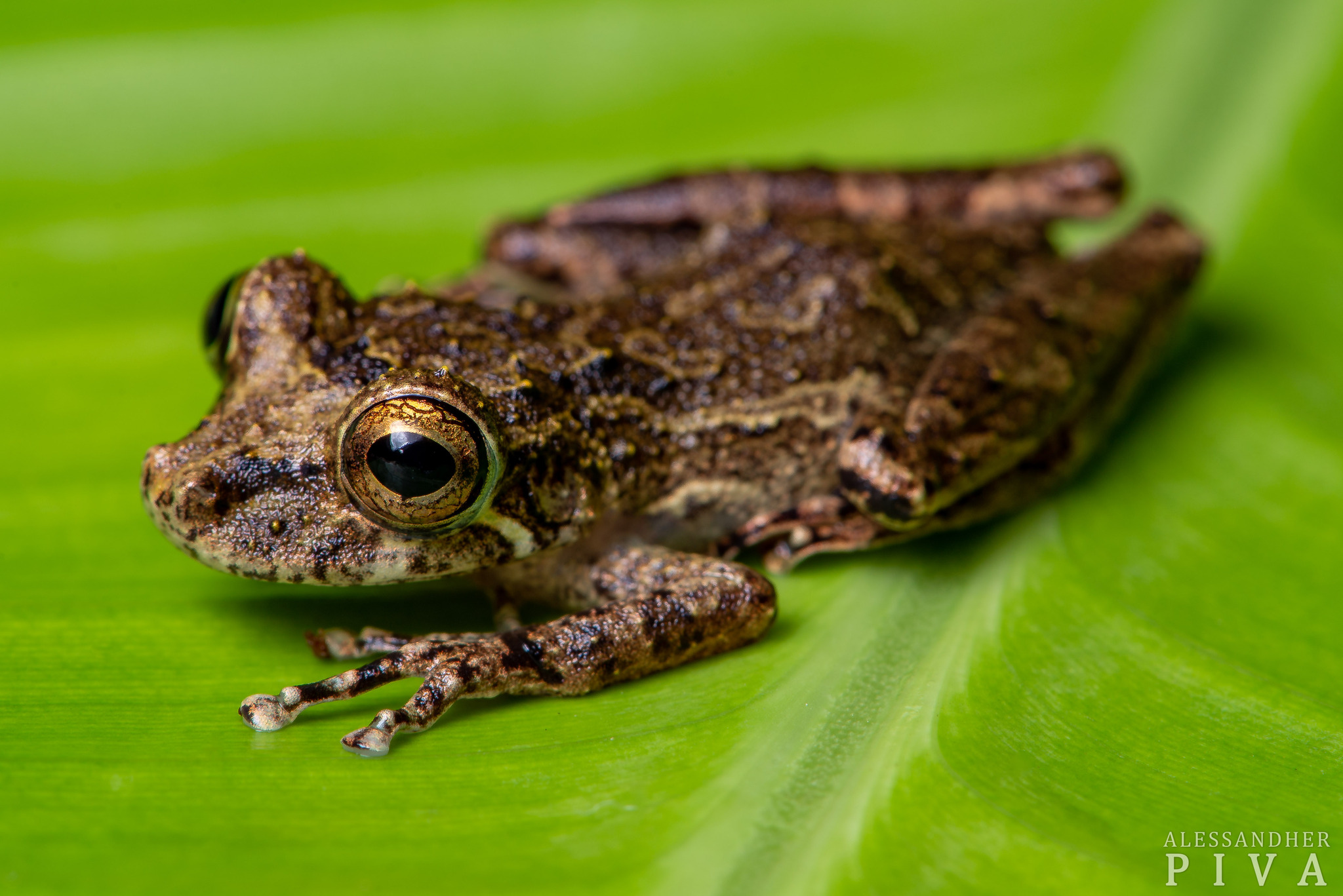

Conservation status
- Least Concern (IUCN 3.1)

Scientific classification
- Kingdom: Animalia
- Phylum: Chordata
- Class: Amphibia
- Order: Anura
- Family: Hylidae
- Genus: Ololygon
- Species: O. littoralis

Binomial name
- Ololygon littoralis (Pombal & Gordo, 1991)

Synonyms
- Scinax littoralis (Pombal & Gordo, 1991)

= Ololygon littoralis =

Species of frog

Ololygon littoralis is a species of frog in the family Hylidae. It is endemic to Brazil. Its natural habitats are subtropical or tropical moist lowland forests and intermittent freshwater marshes. It is threatened by habitat loss.
