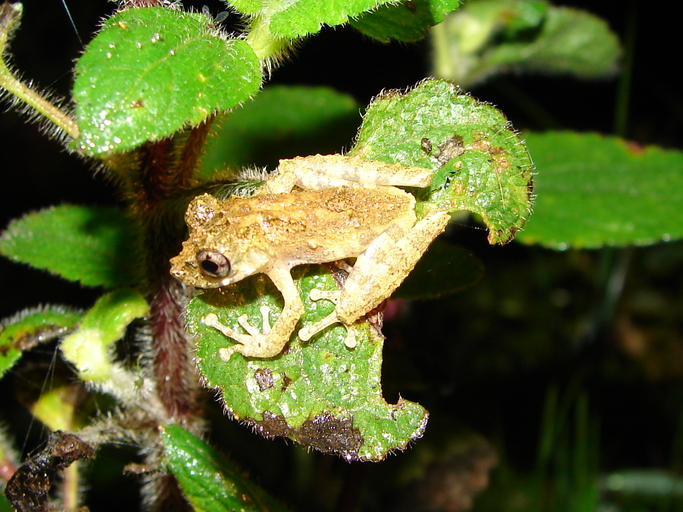

Conservation status
- Least Concern (IUCN 3.1)

Scientific classification
- Kingdom: Animalia
- Phylum: Chordata
- Class: Amphibia
- Order: Anura
- Family: Hylidae
- Genus: Ololygon
- Species: O. carnevallii

Binomial name
- Ololygon carnevallii Caramaschi & Kisteumacher, 1989

Synonyms
- Scinax carnevallii (Caramaschi and Kisteumacher, 1989)

= Ololygon carnevallii =

Species of amphibian

Ololygon carnevallii is a species of frog in the family Hylidae.

It is endemic to Brazil.

Its natural habitats are subtropical or tropical moist lowland forests, freshwater lakes, and freshwater marshes. It is threatened by habitat loss.
