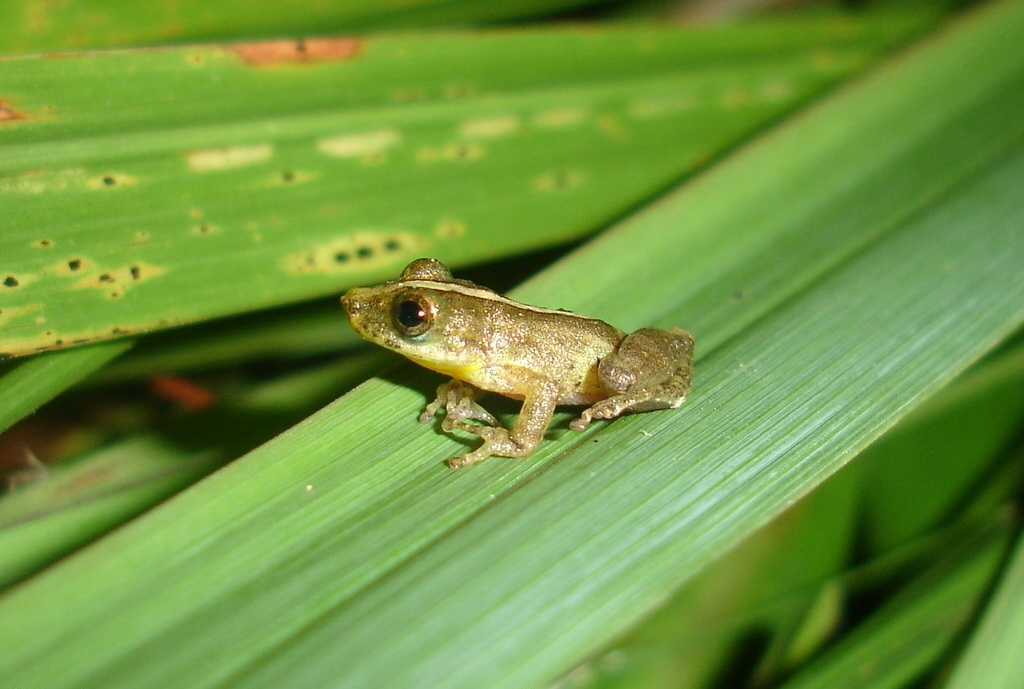

Conservation status
- Least Concern (IUCN 3.1)

Scientific classification
- Kingdom: Animalia
- Phylum: Chordata
- Class: Amphibia
- Order: Anura
- Family: Hylidae
- Genus: Ololygon
- Species: O. argyreornata

Binomial name
- Ololygon argyreornata (Miranda-Ribeiro, 1926)

Synonyms
- Hylodes argyreornatus Miranda-Ribeiro, 1926; Eleutherodactylus argyreornatus Myers, 1962; Hyla argyreornata Bokermann, 1966; Scinax argyreornata Duellman and Wiens, 1992; Scinax argyreornatus Köhler and Böhme, 1996

= Ololygon argyreornata =

Species of amphibian

Ololygon argyreornata, commonly known as the Rio Mutum snouted treefrog, is a species of frog in the family Hylidae endemic to Brazil. Its natural habitats are subtropical or tropical moist lowland forests, subtropical or tropical moist montane forests, subtropical or tropical moist shrubland, freshwater marshes, intermittent freshwater marshes, and heavily degraded former forests. It is threatened by habitat loss.
