= Ololygon faivovichi =

Scientific classification
- Kingdom: Animalia
- Phylum: Chordata
- Class: Amphibia
- Order: Anura
- Family: Hylidae
- Genus: Ololygon
- Species: O. faivovichi

Binomial name
- Ololygon faivovichi (Brasileiro, Oyamaguchi, & Haddad, 2007)

Synonyms
- Scinax faivovichi Brasileiro, Oyamaguchi, & Haddad, 2007

Species of frog

Ololygon faivovichi is a species of frog in the family Hylidae. It is endemic to Brazil.
