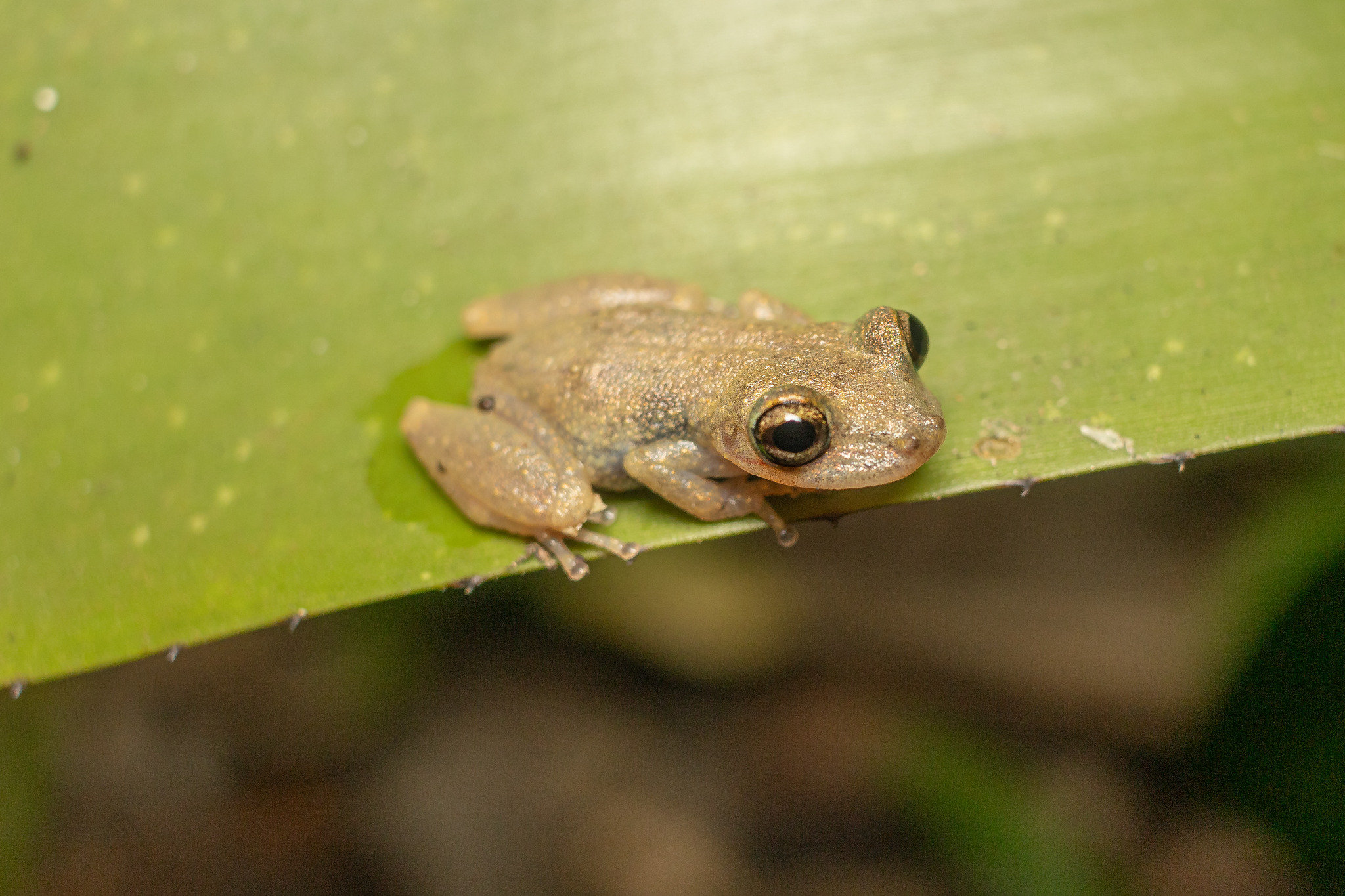

Conservation status
- Endangered (IUCN 3.1)

Scientific classification
- Kingdom: Animalia
- Phylum: Chordata
- Class: Amphibia
- Order: Anura
- Family: Hylidae
- Genus: Ololygon
- Species: O. littorea

Binomial name
- Ololygon littorea Peixoto, 1988

Synonyms
- Scinax littorea Duellman and Wiens, 1992; Scinax littoreus Köhler and Böhme, 1996

= Ololygon littorea =

Species of frog

Ololygon littorea, commonly called the coastal snouted treefrog, is a species of frog in the family Hylidae. It is endemic to the Brazilian state of Rio de Janeiro, where it lives in exposed rock outcroppings and shrubland of coastal forests. It is threatened by habitat loss due to encroaching urban areas.
