= Ololygon agilis =

Conservation status
- Least Concern (IUCN 3.1)

Scientific classification
- Kingdom: Animalia
- Phylum: Chordata
- Class: Amphibia
- Order: Anura
- Family: Hylidae
- Genus: Ololygon
- Species: O. agilis

Binomial name
- Ololygon agilis (Cruz & Peixoto, 1983)

Synonyms
- Scinax agilis (Cruz and Peixoto, 1983)

Species of amphibian

Ololygon agilis, commonly known as the agile snouted treefrog, is a species of frog in the family Hylidae. It is endemic to Brazil, where it occurs along parts of the eastern coast.

This frog lives in bromeliads in forest habitat, especially in the restinga. It is a common frog with no major threats.
