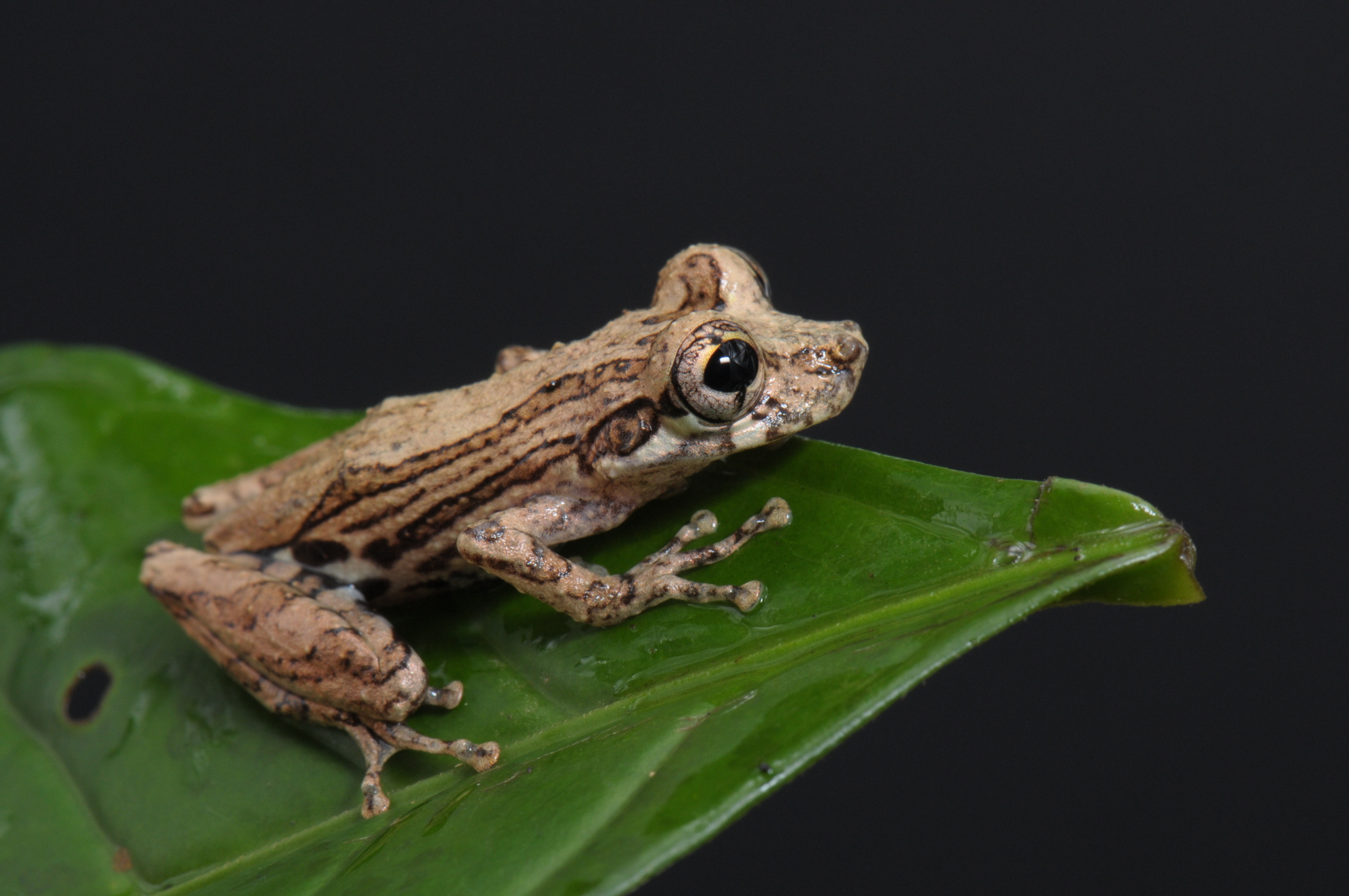

Conservation status
- Data Deficient (IUCN 3.1)

Scientific classification
- Kingdom: Animalia
- Phylum: Chordata
- Class: Amphibia
- Order: Anura
- Family: Hylidae
- Genus: Ololygon
- Species: O. strigilata

Binomial name
- Ololygon strigilata (Spix, 1824)

Synonyms
- Scinax strigilatus (Spix, 1824)

= Ololygon strigilata =

Species of amphibian

Ololygon strigilata is a species of frog in the family Hylidae. It is endemic to Brazil. Its natural habitats are rivers, freshwater marshes, and intermittent freshwater marshes.
