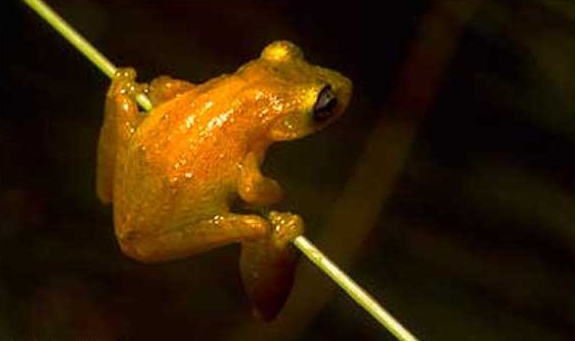

Conservation status
- Least Concern (IUCN 3.1)

Scientific classification
- Kingdom: Animalia
- Phylum: Chordata
- Class: Amphibia
- Order: Anura
- Family: Hylidae
- Genus: Ololygon
- Species: O. berthae

Binomial name
- Ololygon berthae (Barrio, 1962)

Synonyms
- Hyla berthae Barrio, 1962; Scinax berthae (Barrio, 1962)

= Ololygon berthae =

Species of frog

Ololygon berthae, also known as the dwarf snouted treefrog, is a species of frog in the family Hylidae. It is found in northeastern Argentina, southern Paraguay, Uruguay, and southern Brazil. It is named in honor of Bertha Lutz, a Brazilian zoologist and feminist.

It occurs in grasslands and rainforest clearings. Reproduction takes place in temporary pools, also in altered habitats. This locally common species is threatened by habitat loss and pollution.
