= Ololygon peixotoi =

Scientific classification
- Kingdom: Animalia
- Phylum: Chordata
- Class: Amphibia
- Order: Anura
- Family: Hylidae
- Genus: Ololygon
- Species: O. peixotoi

Binomial name
- Ololygon peixotoi (Brasileiro, Haddad, Sawaya, & Martins, 2007)

Synonyms
- Scinax peixotoi Brasileiro, Haddad, Sawaya, & Martins, 2007

Species of frog

Ololygon peixotoi is a species of frog in the family Hylidae. It is endemic to Brazil.
