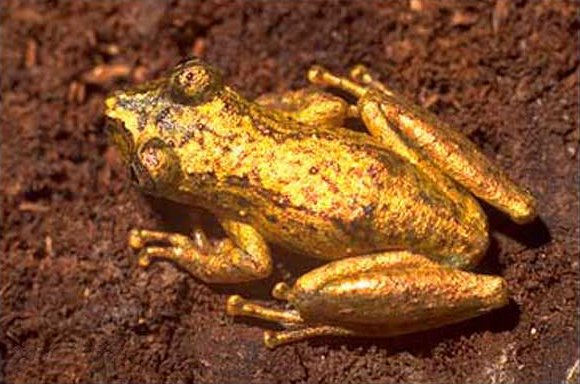

Conservation status
- Least Concern (IUCN 3.1)

Scientific classification
- Kingdom: Animalia
- Phylum: Chordata
- Class: Amphibia
- Order: Anura
- Family: Hylidae
- Genus: Ololygon
- Species: O. rizibilis

Binomial name
- Ololygon rizibilis (Bokermann, 1964)

Synonyms
- Scinax rizibilis (Bokermann, 1964)

= Ololygon rizibilis =

Species of frog

Ololygon rizibilis is a species of frog in the family Hylidae. It is endemic to Brazil. Its natural habitats are subtropical or tropical moist lowland forests and intermittent freshwater marshes. It is threatened by habitat loss.
