= Liolaemus lutzae =

Conservation status
- Critically Endangered (IUCN 3.1)

Scientific classification
- Kingdom: Animalia
- Phylum: Chordata
- Class: Reptilia
- Order: Squamata
- Suborder: Iguania
- Family: Liolaemidae
- Genus: Liolaemus
- Species: L. lutzae

Binomial name
- Liolaemus lutzae Mertens, 1938

Species of lizard

Liolaemus lutzae, called commonly Lutz's tree iguana, is a species of lizard in the family Liolaemidae. The species is endemic to Brazil.

== Etymology ==
The specific name, lutzae, is in honor of Brazilian herpetologist Bertha Lutz.

== Geographic range ==
L. lutzae is found in the Brazilian states of Guanabara and Rio de Janeiro.

== Habitat ==
The natural habitat of L. lutzae is sandy shores.

== Reproduction ==
L. lutzae is oviparous.

== Conservation status ==
L. lutzae is threatened by habitat loss.
