= Ololygon ranki =

Conservation status
- Data Deficient (IUCN 3.1)

Scientific classification
- Kingdom: Animalia
- Phylum: Chordata
- Class: Amphibia
- Order: Anura
- Family: Hylidae
- Genus: Ololygon
- Species: O. ranki

Binomial name
- Ololygon ranki (Andrade & Cardoso, 1987)

Synonyms
- Scinax ranki (Andrade & Cardoso, 1987)

Species of frog

Ololygon ranki is a species of frog in the family Hylidae. It is endemic to southeast Brazil. Its natural habitats are subtropical or tropical moist lowland forests and rivers. It is threatened by habitat loss.
