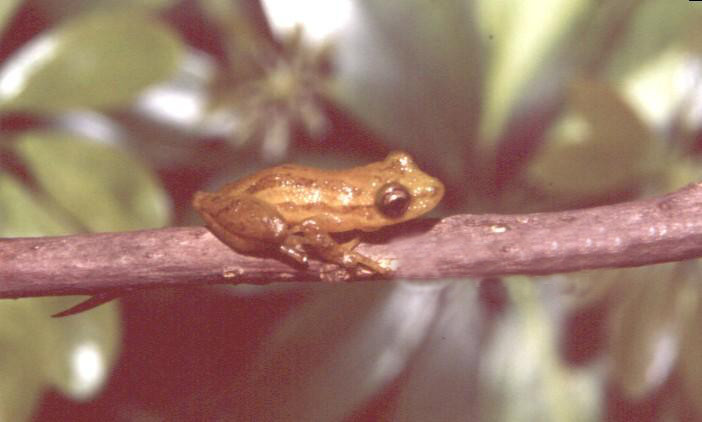

Conservation status
- Least Concern (IUCN 3.1)

Scientific classification
- Kingdom: Animalia
- Phylum: Chordata
- Class: Amphibia
- Order: Anura
- Family: Hylidae
- Genus: Ololygon
- Species: O. cardosoi

Binomial name
- Ololygon cardosoi Carvalho e Silva & Peixoto, 1991

Synonyms
- Scinax cardosoi (Carvalho-e-Silva and Peixoto, 1991)

= Ololygon cardosoi =

Species of frog

Ololygon cardosoi is a species of frog in the family Hylidae. The specific name cardosoi honors Adão José Cardoso, a Brazilian herpetologist.

It is endemic to Brazil. Its natural habitats are subtropical or tropical moist lowland forests, subtropical or tropical moist montane forests, and rivers. It is threatened by habitat loss.
