= Ololygon canastrensis =

Conservation status
- Data Deficient (IUCN 3.1)

Scientific classification
- Kingdom: Animalia
- Phylum: Chordata
- Class: Amphibia
- Order: Anura
- Family: Hylidae
- Genus: Ololygon
- Species: O. canastrensis

Binomial name
- Ololygon canastrensis (Cardoso & Haddad, 1982)

Synonyms
- Scinax canastrensis Cardoso & Haddad, 1982

Species of frog

Ololygon canastrensis is a species of frog in the family Hylidae. It is endemic to Brazil. Its natural habitats are subtropical or tropical dry forests, moist savanna, rivers, pastureland, and rural gardens. It is threatened by habitat loss.
