= Dendropsophus berthalutzae =

Conservation status
- Least Concern (IUCN 3.1)

Scientific classification
- Kingdom: Animalia
- Phylum: Chordata
- Class: Amphibia
- Order: Anura
- Family: Hylidae
- Genus: Dendropsophus
- Species: D. berthalutzae

Binomial name
- Dendropsophus berthalutzae (Bokermann, 1962)

Synonyms
- Hyla berthalutzae Bokermann, 1962

Species of frog

Dendropsophus berthalutzae is a species of frog in the family Hylidae. It is endemic to southeastern Brazil and occurs in the coastal lowlands and the Serra do Mar in Espírito Santo, Minas Gerais, Rio de Janeiro, São Paulo, and eastern Paraná states. It is named in honor of Bertha Lutz, a Brazilian zoologist and feminist. Common name Bertha's treefrog has been coined for it.

== Description ==
Adult males measure 18–21 mm (0.7–0.8 in) and adult females 24 mm (0.9 in) in snout–vent length. Despite its small size, it has a robust appearance. The head is rather wide, and wider than the body. The snout is blunt in dorsal view. The eyes are prominent whereas the tympanum is small. The fingers are wide relatively large discs and some basal webbing. The toes are three-quarters webbed. The dorsal coloration ranges from pale, almost straw color to tawny. There is an interorbital and an X-shaped pattern on the back. Sprinkling with dark chromatophores may be present, obscuring the pattern. Males have a large vocal sac.

The male advertisement call consists of one or two notes, with 2–12 pulses each. The dominant frequency is 4315–4765 Hz. The call is different from the calls of related species.

== Habitat and conservation ==
Dendropsophus berthalutzae is found in the coastal lowlands and the Serra do Mar at elevations up to 1,200 m (3,900 ft) above sea level. It occurs low in vegetation in secondary forest, often near swamps, and in open areas, such as grassland. The eggs are hung in the vegetation above temporary still water; the tadpoles fall to the water and develop there.

Dendropsophus berthalutzae is a very common species. It is adaptable, but could be locally impacted by agriculture and wood plantations.
