= Ololygon jureia =

Conservation status
- Data Deficient (IUCN 3.1)

Scientific classification
- Kingdom: Animalia
- Phylum: Chordata
- Class: Amphibia
- Order: Anura
- Family: Hylidae
- Genus: Ololygon
- Species: O. jureia

Binomial name
- Ololygon jureia (Pombal & Gordo, 1991)

Synonyms
- Scinax jureia (Pombal & Gordo, 1991)

Species of frog

Ololygon jureia is a species of frog in the family Hylidae. It is endemic to Brazil. Its natural habitats are subtropical or tropical moist lowland forests and intermittent freshwater marshes. It is threatened by habitat loss. It takes its name from the Juréia Massif in the Juréia-Itatins Ecological Station, where it has been found.

== Sources ==
- (in Portuguese) Juréia Itatins
