= Ololygon centralis =

Conservation status
- Least Concern (IUCN 3.1)

Scientific classification
- Kingdom: Animalia
- Phylum: Chordata
- Class: Amphibia
- Order: Anura
- Family: Hylidae
- Genus: Ololygon
- Species: O. centralis

Binomial name
- Ololygon centralis (Pombal & Bastos, 1996)

Synonyms
- Scinax centralis Pombal & Bastos, 1996

Species of frog

Ololygon centralis is a species of frog in the family Hylidae. It is endemic to Brazil. Its natural habitats are subtropical or tropical dry forests, moist savanna, subtropical or tropical moist shrubland, rivers, and intermittent freshwater marshes. It is threatened by habitat loss.
