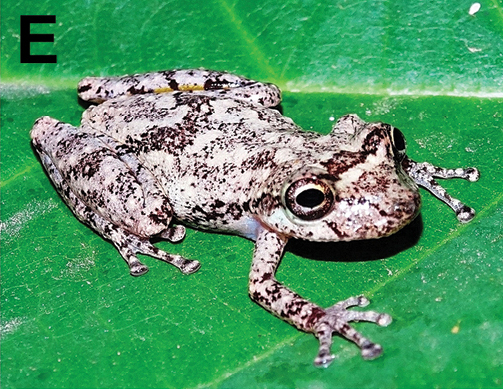

Conservation status
- Least Concern (IUCN 3.1)

Scientific classification
- Kingdom: Animalia
- Phylum: Chordata
- Class: Amphibia
- Order: Anura
- Family: Hylidae
- Genus: Ololygon
- Species: O. arduoa

Binomial name
- Ololygon arduoa (Peixoto, 2002)

Synonyms
- Scinax arduous Peixoto, 2002

= Ololygon arduoa =

Species of frog

Ololygon arduoa is a species of frog in the family Hylidae endemic to Brazil. Its natural habitat is subtropical or tropical moist lowland forests. It is threatened by habitat loss.
