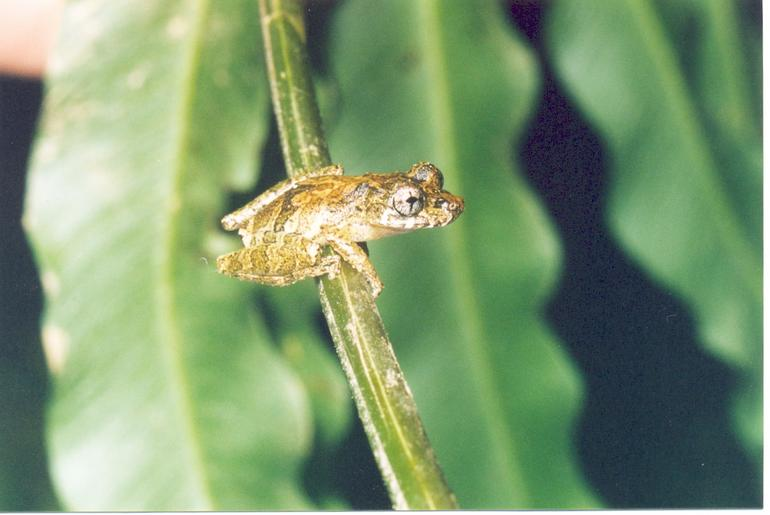

Conservation status
- Least Concern (IUCN 3.1)

Scientific classification
- Kingdom: Animalia
- Phylum: Chordata
- Class: Amphibia
- Order: Anura
- Family: Hylidae
- Genus: Ololygon
- Species: O. machadoi

Binomial name
- Ololygon machadoi (Bokermann & Sazima, 1973)

Synonyms
- Scinax machadoi (Bokermann & Sazima, 1973)

= Ololygon machadoi =

Species of frog

Ololygon machadoi is a species of frog in the family Hylidae. It is endemic to Brazil. Its natural habitats are subtropical or tropical moist lowland forests, subtropical or tropical moist montane forests, subtropical or tropical moist shrubland, and rivers. It is threatened by habitat loss.
