= Ololygon melloi =

Conservation status
- Near Threatened (IUCN 3.1)

Scientific classification
- Kingdom: Animalia
- Phylum: Chordata
- Class: Amphibia
- Order: Anura
- Family: Hylidae
- Genus: Ololygon
- Species: O. melloi

Binomial name
- Ololygon melloi Peixoto, 1989

Synonyms
- Scinax melloi (Peixoto, 1989)

Species of frog

Ololygon melloi is a species of frog in the family Hylidae.

It is endemic to Brazil. Its natural habitat is subtropical or tropical moist montane forests.
