= Ololygon atrata =

Conservation status
- Data Deficient (IUCN 3.1)

Scientific classification
- Kingdom: Animalia
- Phylum: Chordata
- Class: Amphibia
- Order: Anura
- Family: Hylidae
- Genus: Ololygon
- Species: O. atrata

Binomial name
- Ololygon atrata (Peixoto, 1989)

Synonyms
- Scinax atratus (Peixoto, 1989)

Species of amphibian

Ololygon atrata is a species of frogs in the family Hylidae.

It is endemic to Brazil. Its natural habitats are subtropical or tropical moist montane forests.
