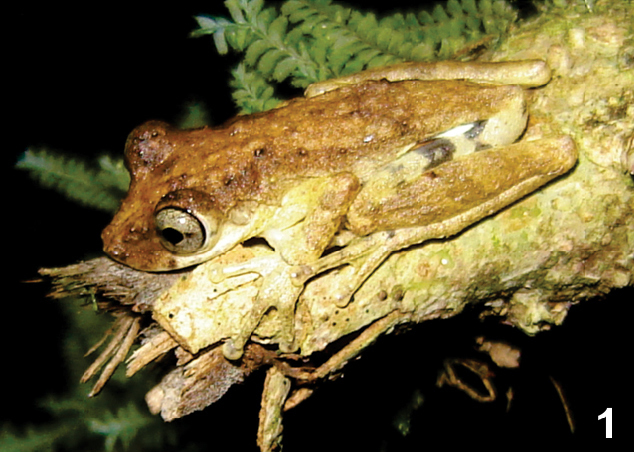

Conservation status
- Least Concern (IUCN 3.1)

Scientific classification
- Kingdom: Animalia
- Phylum: Chordata
- Class: Amphibia
- Order: Anura
- Family: Hylidae
- Genus: Ololygon
- Species: O. albicans

Binomial name
- Ololygon albicans (Bokermann, 1967)

Synonyms
- Scinax albicans (Bokermann, 1967); Scinax opalinus (B. Lutz, 1968)

= Ololygon albicans =

Species of amphibian

Ololygon albicans, commonly known as the Teresopolis snouted treefrog, is a species of frog in the family Hylidae endemic to Brazil. Its natural habitats are subtropical or tropical moist lowland forests, subtropical or tropical moist montane forests, and rivers. It is threatened by habitat loss.
