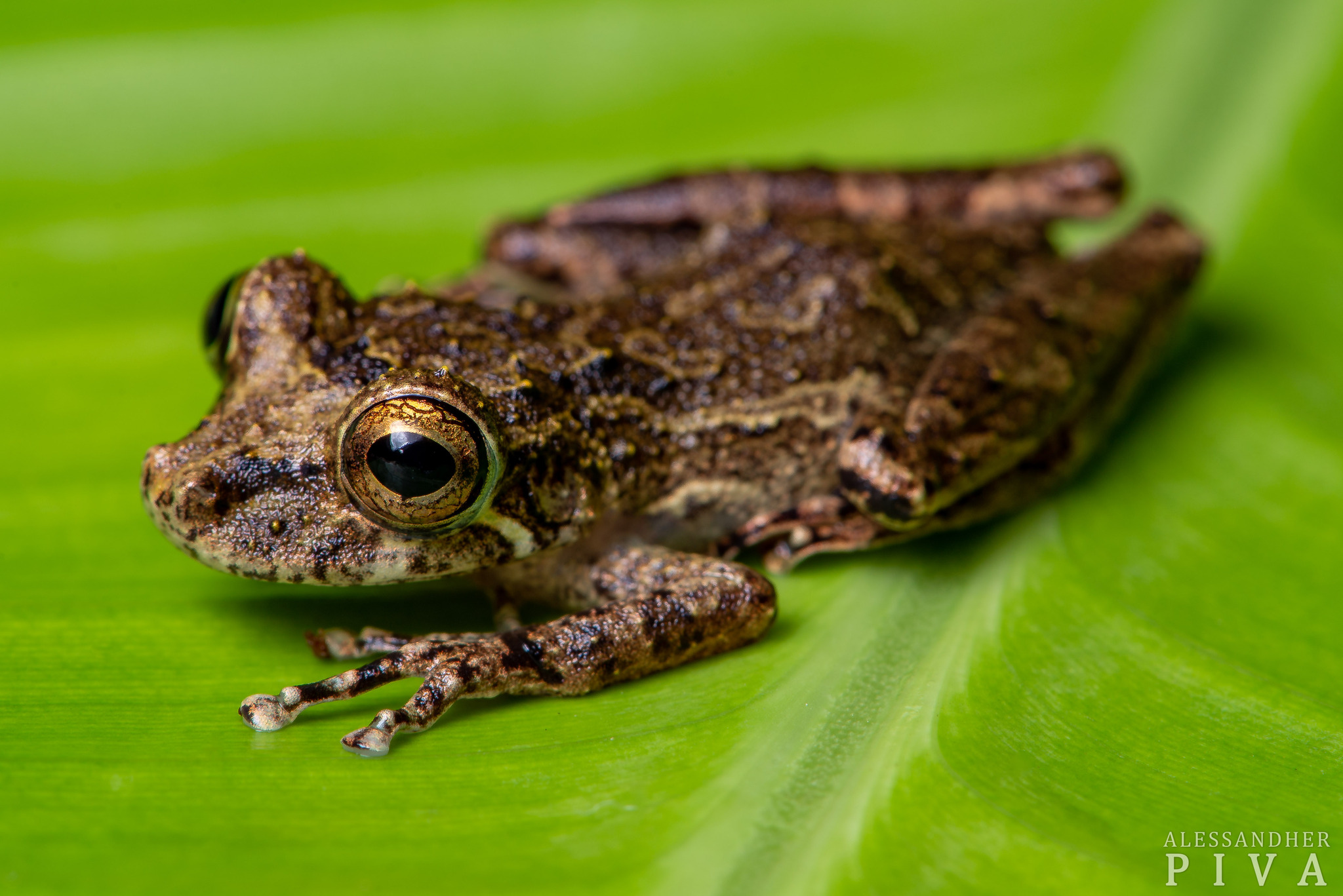
- Ololygon littoralis

Scientific classification
- Kingdom: Animalia
- Phylum: Chordata
- Class: Amphibia
- Order: Anura
- Family: Hylidae
- Subfamily: Scinaxinae
- Genus: Ololygon; Fitzinger, 1830

Species
- See text

= Ololygon =

Genus of amphibians

Ololygon is a genus of frogs in the family Hylidae. The majority of species in it are endemic to the Atlantic Forest of eastern Brazil, although the range of some species, including Ololygon aromothyella and Ololygon berthae, is known to extend south to northeastern Argentina, southern Paraguay, and Uruguay.

== Species ==
The following species are recognized in the genus Ololygon:

- Ololygon agilis (Cruz and Peixoto, 1983)
- Ololygon albicans (Bokermann, 1967)
- Ololygon alcatraz (Lutz, 1973)
- Ololygon angrensis (Lutz, 1973)
- Ololygon arduoa (Peixoto, 2002)
- Ololygon argyreornata (Miranda-Ribeiro, 1926)
- Ololygon ariadne (Bokermann, 1967)
- Ololygon aromothyella Faivovich, 2005
- Ololygon atrata (Peixoto, 1989)
- Ololygon belloni (Faivovich, Gasparini, and Haddad, 2010)
- Ololygon berthae (Barrio, 1962)
- Ololygon brieni (De Witte, 1930)
- Ololygon caissara (Lourenço, Zina, Catroli, Kasahara, Faivovich, and Haddad, 2016)
- Ololygon canastrensis (Cardoso and Haddad, 1982)
- Ololygon cardosoi Carvalho-e-Silva and Peixoto, 1991
- Ololygon carnevallii Caramaschi and Kisteumacher, 1989
- Ololygon catharinae (Boulenger, 1888)
- Ololygon centralis (Pombal and Bastos, 1996)
- Ololygon cosenzai (Lacerda, Peixoto, and Feio, 2012)
- Ololygon faivovichi (Brasileiro, Oyamaguchi, and Haddad, 2007)
- Ololygon feioi (Lourenço, Lacerda, Cruz, Nascimento, and Pombal, 2020)
- Ololygon flavoguttata (Lutz and Lutz, 1939)
- Ololygon garibaldiae (Lourenço, Lingnau, Haddad, and Faivovich, 2019)
- Ololygon goya (Andrade, Santos, Rocha, Pombal, and Vaz-Silva, 2018)
- Ololygon heyeri Peixoto and Weygoldt, 1987
- Ololygon hiemalis (Haddad and Pombal, 1987)
- Ololygon humilis (A. Lutz and B. Lutz, 1954)
- Ololygon insperata (Silva and Alves-Silva, 2011)
- Ololygon jureia (Pombal and Gordo, 1991)
- Ololygon kautskyi (Carvalho-e-Silva and Peixoto, 1991)
- Ololygon littoralis (Pombal and Gordo, 1991)
- Ololygon littorea Peixoto, 1988
- Ololygon longilinea (Lutz, 1968)
- Ololygon luizotavioi Caramaschi and Kisteumacher, 1989
- Ololygon machadoi (Bokermann and Sazima, 1973)
- Ololygon melanodactyla (Lourenço, Luna, and Pombal, 2014)
- Ololygon melloi Peixoto, 1989
- Ololygon muriciensis (Cruz, Nunes, and Lima, 2011)
- Ololygon obtriangulata (Lutz, 1973)
- Ololygon peixotoi (Brasileiro, Haddad, Sawaya, and Martins, 2007)
- Ololygon perpusilla (Lutz and Lutz, 1939)
- Ololygon pixinguinha (Lacerda, Ferreira, Araujo-Vieira, Zocca, and Lourenço, 2021)
- Ololygon pombali (Lourenço, Carvalho, Baêta, Pezzuti, and Leite, 2013)
- Ololygon ranki (Andrade and Cardoso, 1987)
- Ololygon rizibilis (Bokermann, 1964)
- Ololygon skaios (Pombal, Carvalho, Canelas, and Bastos, 2010)
- Ololygon skuki (Lima, Cruz, and Azevedo, 2011)
- Ololygon strigilata (Spix, 1824)
- Ololygon trapicheiroi (A. Lutz and B. Lutz, 1954)
- Ololygon tripui (Lourenço, Nascimento, and Pires, 2010)
- Ololygon tupinamba (Silva and Alves-Silva, 2008)
- Ololygon v-signata (Lutz, 1968)
