= Ololygon aromothyella =

Conservation status
- Least Concern (IUCN 3.1)

Scientific classification
- Kingdom: Animalia
- Phylum: Chordata
- Class: Amphibia
- Order: Anura
- Family: Hylidae
- Genus: Ololygon
- Species: O. aromothyella

Binomial name
- Ololygon aromothyella (Faivovich, 2005)

Synonyms
- Scinax aromothyella Faivovich, 2005

Species of frog

Ololygon aromothyella is a species of frog in the family Hylidae, found in Argentina, Uruguay and Brazil.

Its natural habitats are subtropical or tropical moist lowland forests, subtropical or tropical seasonally wet or flooded lowland grassland, rivers, freshwater marshes, and intermittent freshwater marshes.
