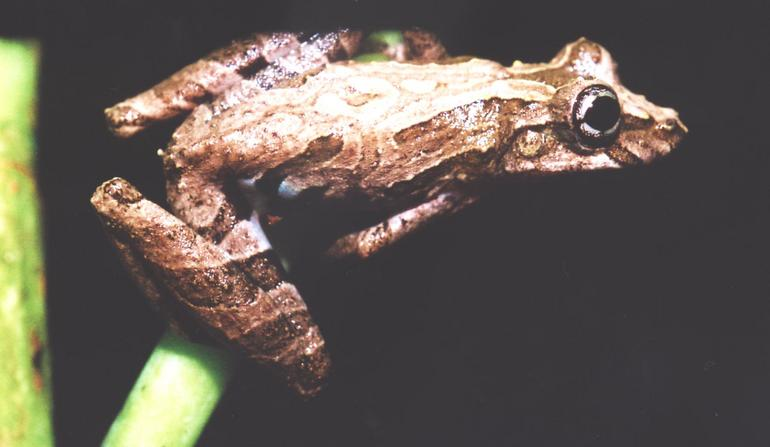

Conservation status
- Least Concern (IUCN 3.1)

Scientific classification
- Kingdom: Animalia
- Phylum: Chordata
- Class: Amphibia
- Order: Anura
- Family: Hylidae
- Genus: Ololygon
- Species: O. hiemalis

Binomial name
- Ololygon hiemalis (Haddad & Pombal, 1987)

Synonyms
- Scinax hiemalis (Haddad & Pombal, 1987)

= Ololygon hiemalis =

Species of frog

Ololygon hiemalis is a species of frog in the family Hylidae. It is endemic to Brazil. Its natural habitats are subtropical or tropical moist lowland forests, rivers, and freshwater marshes. It is threatened by habitat loss.
