= Ololygon heyeri =

Conservation status
- Data Deficient (IUCN 3.1)

Scientific classification
- Kingdom: Animalia
- Phylum: Chordata
- Class: Amphibia
- Order: Anura
- Family: Hylidae
- Genus: Ololygon
- Species: O. heyeri

Binomial name
- Ololygon heyeri Peixoto & Weygoldt, 1986

Synonyms
- Scinax heyeri (Peixoto & Weygoldt, 1986)

Species of frog

Ololygon heyeri is a species of frog in the family Hylidae. It is endemic to Brazil. Its natural habitats are subtropical or tropical moist lowland forests and rivers. It is threatened by habitat loss.

== Sources ==
- Oswaldo Luiz Peixoto, Bruno Pimenta (2004). "Ololygon heyeri". IUCN Red List of Threatened Species. 2004 e.T55962A11401832. doi:10.2305/IUCN.UK.2004.RLTS.T55962A11401832.en.
