= Ololygon kautskyi =

Conservation status
- Data Deficient (IUCN 3.1)

Scientific classification
- Kingdom: Animalia
- Phylum: Chordata
- Class: Amphibia
- Order: Anura
- Family: Hylidae
- Genus: Ololygon
- Species: O. kautskyi

Binomial name
- Ololygon kautskyi Carvalho-e-Silva & Peixoto, 1991

Synonyms
- Scinax kautskyi (Carvalho-e-Silva & Peixoto, 1991)

Species of frog

Ololygon kautskyi is a species of frog in the family Hylidae. It is endemic to Brazil. Its natural habitats are subtropical or tropical moist lowland forests, rivers, and heavily degraded former forest. It is threatened by habitat loss.
