= Ololygon luizotavioi =

Conservation status
- Least Concern (IUCN 3.1)

Scientific classification
- Kingdom: Animalia
- Phylum: Chordata
- Class: Amphibia
- Order: Anura
- Family: Hylidae
- Genus: Ololygon
- Species: O. luizotavioi

Binomial name
- Ololygon luizotavioi Caramaschi & Kisteumacher, 1989

Synonyms
- Scinax luizotavioi (Caramaschi and Kisteumacher, 1989)

Species of amphibian

Ololygon luizotavioi is a species of frog in the family Hylidae. It is endemic to Brazil.

Its natural habitats are subtropical or tropical moist lowland forests, subtropical or tropical moist montane forests, moist savanna, subtropical or tropical moist shrubland, subtropical or tropical dry lowland grassland, subtropical or tropical high-altitude grassland, rivers, freshwater marshes, intermittent freshwater marshes, pastureland, rural gardens, ponds, and canals and ditches. It is threatened by habitat loss.
