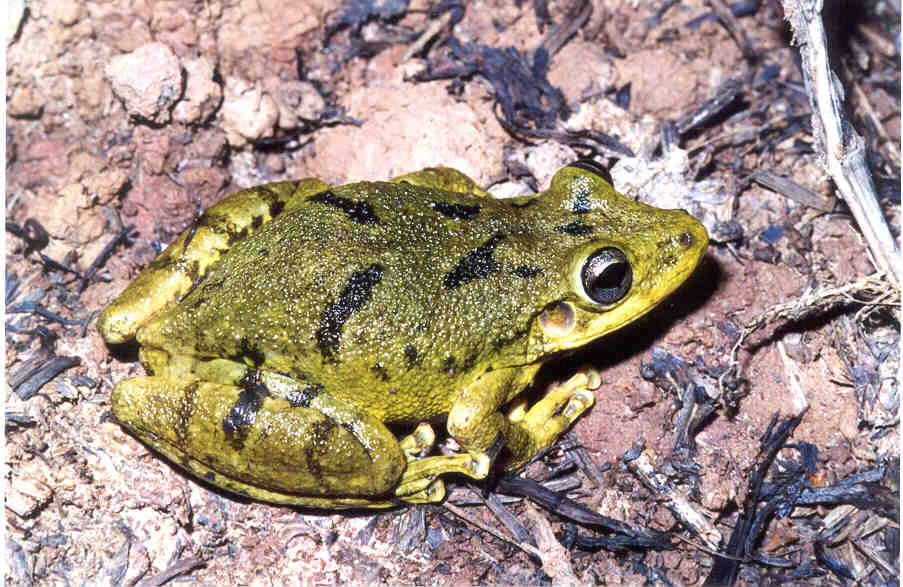

Conservation status
- Least Concern (IUCN 3.1)

Scientific classification
- Kingdom: Animalia
- Phylum: Chordata
- Class: Amphibia
- Order: Anura
- Family: Hylidae
- Genus: Ololygon
- Species: O. catharinae

Binomial name
- Ololygon catharinae (Boulenger, 1888)

Synonyms
- Scinax catharinae (Boulenger, 1888)

= Ololygon catharinae =

Species of frog

Ololygon catharinae is a species of frog in the family Hylidae. It is endemic to Brazil. Its natural habitats are subtropical or tropical moist lowland forests, subtropical or tropical moist montane forests, rivers, freshwater marshes, and intermittent freshwater marshes. It is threatened by habitat loss.
