= Arianna (yacht) =

2012 motor yacht

History
- Builder: Delta Marine Group
- Laid down: July 2009
- Launched: April 2012
- Identification: IMO number: 9570345; MMSI number: 538070840; Callsign: V7YI6

General characteristics
- Displacement: 552 long tons (561 t) (half load)
- Length: 164 ft (50 m) loa; 147 ft 7 in (44.98 m) LWL
- Beam: 34 ft 1 in (10.39 m)
- Draft: 9 ft 7 in (2.92 m) (half load)
- Installed power: 1,650 ihp (1,230 kW)
- Propulsion: 2 × Caterpillar 3512B Diesel engines
- Speed: 16 kn (30 km/h; 18 mph)
- Range: 5,000 nmi (9,300 km; 5,800 mi) at 13 kn (24 km/h; 15 mph)
- Capacity: 21,900 US gal (83,000 L; 18,200 imp gal) Diesel fuel
- Crew: 12

Arianna is a 164-foot (50 m) full-displacement luxury megayacht designed and built by Delta Marine Group. Delivered in June 2012, Arianna has a 34-foot (10 m) beam, 7,500 square feet (700 m^{2}) of living space, and more than 822 gross tonnage (ITC), which makes Arianna the world's largest volume 50 m yacht (most yachts of this LOA are maxed at 500 tons). Arianna is equipped with twin Caterpillar 3512B engines that give her a cruising speed of 14.5 knots and a maximum speed of 16 knots. She carries 21,900 US gallons (83,000 L; 18,200 imp gal) of fuel and has a range of over 5,000 nautical miles (9,300 km; 5,800 mi).

Arianna's interior was designed by Delta Design Group in Seattle, Washington. Her interior is based on a Polynesian theme and is adorned with rare tropical hardwoods including Makassar Ebony, wenge, and koa, an antique Doettling safe, colorful blown glass lighting, as well as a Balinese inspired solid slab dining table.

== History ==
Arianna's build began in July 2009, exactly three years before her delivery date. Arianna's launch was announced in April 2012. Arianna made her world debut at the Fort Lauderdale International Boat Show on October 25, 2012. Her marketing includes a fully interactive virtual tour of the yacht, an innovative web site, and appearances in Times Square.

As of December 2012, Arianna was featured in over 100 magazines, publications and websites including covers on ShowBoats International, Revista Yates, Super Yacht Industry, Boats International, Invictus Magazine, Yachts Russia, SuperYacht World, and Yachting Russia.

In 2013, the Arianna appeared in a video for "Sexy People", also known as "The Fiat Song", by rapper Pitbull, featuring Italian singer Arianna Bergamaschi. Arianna has been rumored to be owned by international financier and entrepreneur, Dovi Frances.

== Specifications and Features ==
M.Y. Arianna
	Metric	Imperial
Length	50 m	164 ft
Beam	10.30 m	33 ft 9 in
Draft	2.9 m	9 ft 7 in
Displacement	822 ITC	
Max Speed	30 km/h	16 knots
Cruise Speed	27 km/h	14.5 knots
Fuel Capacity	82900 L	21,900 US g
Fresh Water Capacity	11356 L	3,000 US g
Crew	12	
Owner and Guests	12	
Classification	LR100 A1 SSC Yacht G6 Mono MCH	
Generators		2x CAT C6.6 125 kW
Engines	2x CAT 3512B 1230 kW	2x CAT 3512B, 1,650 BHp @ 1,600rpm
Cable	72392 m	237,508 ft
Teak	4023 m	13,200 ft
