= Ololygon brieni =

Conservation status
- Least Concern (IUCN 3.1)

Scientific classification
- Kingdom: Animalia
- Phylum: Chordata
- Class: Amphibia
- Order: Anura
- Family: Hylidae
- Genus: Ololygon
- Species: O. brieni

Binomial name
- Ololygon brieni (De Witte, 1930)

Synonyms
- Scinax brieni (De Witte, 1930)

Species of amphibian

Ololygon brieni is a species of frogs in the family Hylidae.

It is endemic to Brazil. Its natural habitats are subtropical or tropical moist lowland forests, subtropical or tropical moist montane forests, rivers, freshwater marshes, arable land, pastureland, plantations, rural gardens, urban areas, heavily degraded former forest, ponds, irrigated land, seasonally flooded agricultural land, and canals and ditches.
