= Ololygon tupinamba =

Scientific classification
- Domain: Eukaryota
- Kingdom: Animalia
- Phylum: Chordata
- Class: Amphibia
- Order: Anura
- Family: Hylidae
- Genus: Ololygon
- Species: O. tupinamba

Binomial name
- Ololygon tupinamba (da Silva & Alves-Silva, 2008)

Synonyms
- Scinax tupinamba (da Silva & Alves-Silva, 2008)

Species of frog

Ololygon tupinamba is a species of amphibian in the Hylidae family. Endemic to Brazil, where it can be found in the municipalities of Mangaratiba and Angra dos Reis, in the state of Rio de Janeiro.
