= Ariadne (1794 ship) =

History

Great Britain
- Name: Ariadne
- Namesake: Ariadne
- Owner: 1794:Lacy Lotherington; 1796:J. Reeve
- Builder: G. and N. Langborne, Whitby
- Launched: 6 October 1794
- Fate: Last listed 1811

General characteristics
- Tons burthen: 401, or 418, (bm)
- Propulsion: Sail
- Complement: 30
- Armament: 1797:14 × 6-pounder guns; 1798:6 × 6-pounder + 4 × 4-pounder guns

Ariadne was launched in 1794 at Whitby. Two years later a new owner shifted her registry to London. She then made one voyage for the British East India Company. On her return she sailed on between England and the West Indies. She is last listed in 1811.

== Career ==
After her change of ownership and registration in 1796, Ariadne appears in Lloyd's Register for 1796 with G. Faith, master, J. Reeves, owner, and trade London—Jamaica. The next year her master changed to J. Walker, and her trade to London—East India.

Captain John Walker acquired a letter of marque on 4 January 1797. (Note: Hackman, following Hardy, reports that Captain Alexander Sterling was Ariadne's master for her voyage for the EIC. However, he was her master from 1800 to 1803.) He sailed on 16 February from Falmouth, bound for Madras and Bengal. Ariadne reached Calcutta on 29 June. Homeward bound, she was at Culpee on 16 October and reached the Cape on 4 January 1799. She reached St Helena on 23 January, and left on 1 May, arriving at Cork on 24 June and Deptford on 15 July.

On her return, Ariadne resumed her trade with the West Indies.

| Year | Master | Owner | Trade |
|---|---|---|---|
| 1798 | J.Walker; Dixon | J. Reeve | London—India; London—Antigua |
| 1799 | Dixon; Langley | J. Reeve | London—Antigua; London transport |
| 1800 | Langley; A. Sterling | J. Reeve | London transport London—Jamaica |
| 1801 | A. Sterling | J. Reeve | London—Jamaica |
| 1802 | A. Sterling | J. Reeve | London—Jamaica |
| 1803 | J.Sterling; J. Sunley | J. Reeve | London—Jamaica |
| 1804 | J. Sunley | J. Reeve | London—Jamaica |

The 1804 information continues unchanged in Lloyd's Register to 1809, and in the Register of Shipping to 1811. Ariadne is absent from the subsequent registers.
