= Ariadne (archive) =

- Interactive map of Ariadne
- 48.20644678522376°N 16.36733518061881°E
- Location: Josefsplatz 1, 1015, Vienna, Austria
- Established: 1992

Ariadne is an information and documentation center on women/gender hosted by the Austrian National Library in Vienna. Ariadne was founded by Christa Bittermann-Wille and Helga Hofmann-Weinberger in 1992 with the aim of facilitating study on gender and women. It provides a digital interface for locating information by and about women. The center is located at Josefsplatz 1, A-1015 in Vienna, which is the address of the Austrian National Library, and does not offer a separate facility for women's research.

== History ==
Between 1986 and 1987, Christa Bittermann-Wille and Andrea Fennesz, conducted a feasibility study in coordination with the Austrian Ministry of Science, on the creation of an information and documentation center for women. The rise of Second-wave feminism and the establishment of new feminist research within academia had brought forward the dissatisfaction with the availability and depth of coverage of women's topics in traditional library collections. Similar organizations abroad, like the Atria Institute in Amsterdam and the FrauenMediaTurm in Cologne, were studied. One of the biggest questions posed in the study was whether state intervention in the collection of women's documents would be accepted by institutions which already had begun women's collections as an imposition of patriarchy. It was proposed that such a collection be housed under the auspices of the Austrian National Library, as it was the largest scientific library in the country. In 1991, Bittermann-Wille began a series of consultations with interested stakeholders to determine whether the project would be accepted by other women's libraries, archives and their curators and patrons. The time period coincided with the birth of the digital age and archivists and librarians saw potential in the proposal, as long as the state did not dictate what materials should be collected and retained.

== Organization ==
Ariadne was founded by Bittermann-Wille and Helga Hofmann-Weinberger in 1992 with the aim of facilitating study on gender and women. The facility provides a digital interface for locating information by and about women. Because traditional categorization of women's materials often obscured relevant works, produced limited search results, or were did not adequately represent women's works, new types of categorization were developed. Through networks with women's study institutions, historians and literary writers, Ariadne began to collect historic records to make them available for study and research with the goal of restoring the cultural memory and women's visibility in the historical record.

Ariadne functions as a department of the Austrian National Library and does not have a designated reading room, nor are the works kept separately shelved from the library's other collections. The collections began being digitized and offered through a web portal in 2000 to broaden accessibility. A limitation on the material is that it is mostly available in the German language.

== Collections and productions ==
The collections of Ariadne contain works by and about women, their works, and the movements they were involved in as found in literature and other publications, as well as in gender and feminist studies. Though the focus is primarily on Austrian women, the collection also contains material on women from other countries.

The collection on the early women's movement in Austria is titled Frauen in Bewegung (Women in Motion). Digitization of women's journals, magazines, and newspapers from the time of the Habsburg monarchy (1282–1806) is an on-going process. Many of the journals provide information on notable historic figures, but also illuminate those unknown activists and the associations and activities they were involved with.

Collaborative works have been sponsored by Ariadne and resulted in the production of BiographiA, KolloquiA, and ThesaurA, among others. ThesaurA was created in 1997 to provide a gendered language guide and inclusive reference to be used by archives and libraries to facilitate location of materials. The aim was not simply to make both sexes visible, rather than relying on a customary "default is male" categorization, but to also make gender less obscure in searching for materials using collective nouns, such as workers or movement. KolloquiA was published in 2001 and presents an inventory of available materials, research facilities and teaching references for women's information in Austria. Designed for both feminist experts and information science professionals, the material is designed to facilitate gender research.

Though the BiographiA project began in 1998, the research required to compile the 6,500 biographies in the 4-volume publication delayed publication until 2015. The lexicon provides biographical sketches of Austrian women from the Roman period to the 21st century. In addition to the published volumes, Ariadne hosts an on-line database of around 20,000 biographies.
