= Dovi Frances =

Israeli businessman (born 1978)

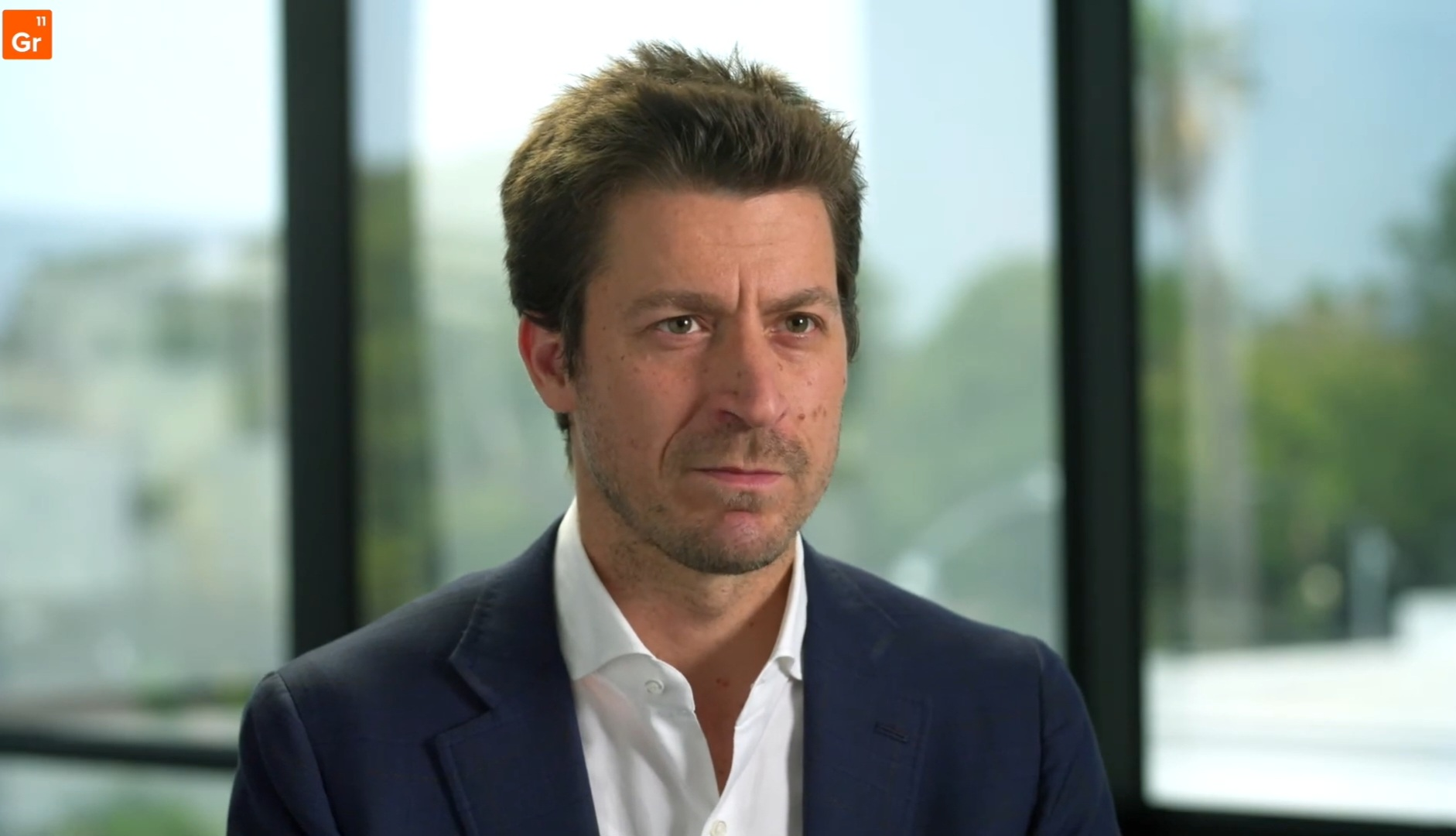
- Born: November 20, 1978 (age 47); Israel
- Citizenship: Israeli-American
- Education: Ben-Gurion University (BA), UCLA Anderson School of Management (MBA)
- Occupation: Businessman

Dov "Dovi" Frances (Hebrew: דובי פרנסס; born November 20, 1978) is an Israeli-American businessman and television personality. He appeared on HaKrishim, the Israeli version of Shark Tank.

Dov Frances was born in Holon, Israel. His father worked as a customs agent before establishing a car dealership business. He is married to Roni Eshel, a former Israeli surfing champion, and they have three children. The family lives in Brentwood, Los Angeles.

Frances served as an advisor to Israeli Prime Minister Benjamin Netanyahu on artificial intelligence in 2024. Frances has also founded a venture capital.
