= Ariadna Sintes =

Cuban-Spanish actress

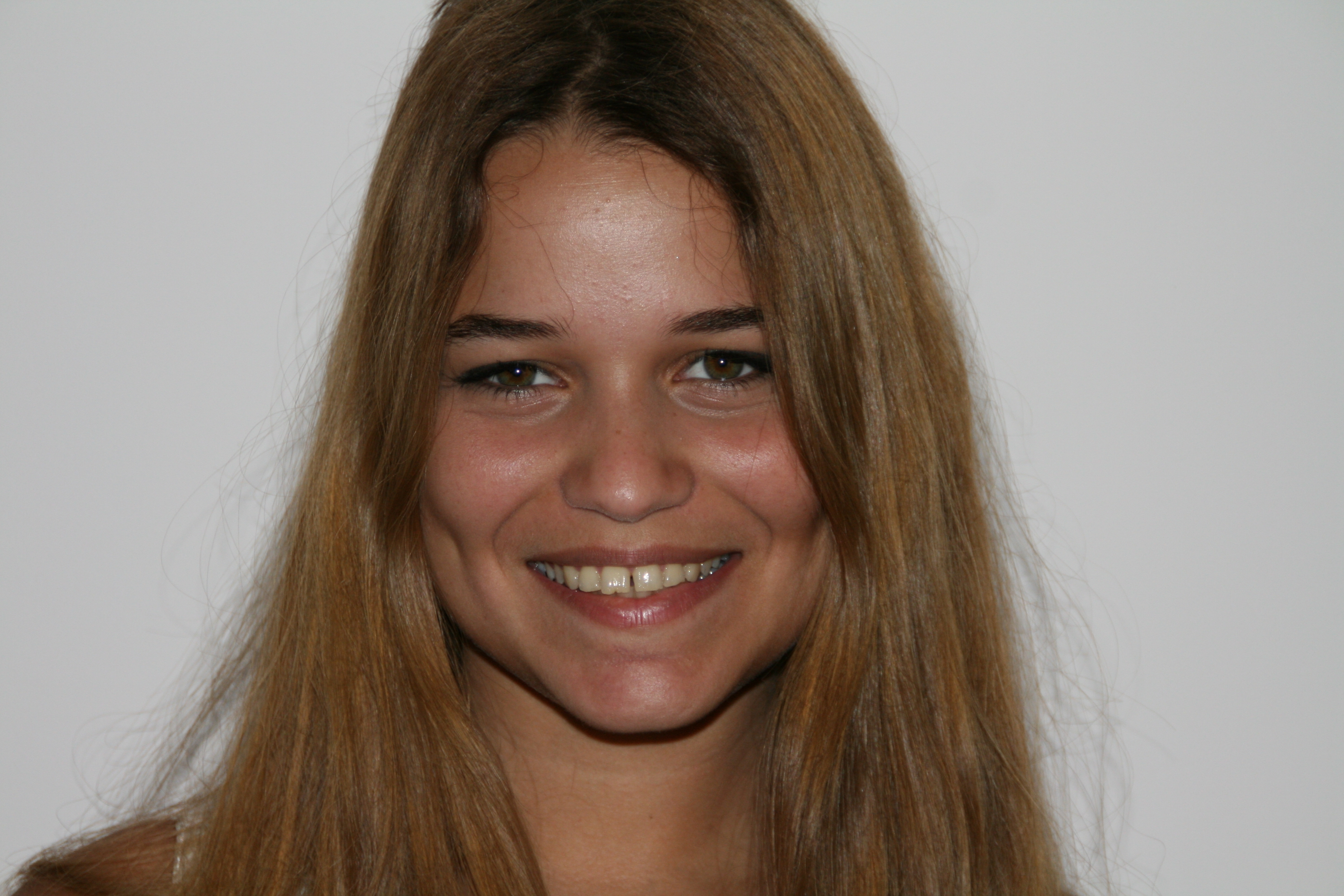
Ariadna Sintes, 2009

Ariadna Sintes (born October 7, 1986, in Havana) is a Cuban-Spanish actress.

Born in Cuba, she moved to San Sebastián in 2000 and she studied at the School of Cinema and Video in Andoain and drama in San Sebastián.

== Television ==
- Bi eta Bat (2012)
- Maras (2011)
- HKM (2008–2009)
- Mi querido Klikowsky (2007)
- Desde Ahora (1990)

== References and external links ==
- Ariadna Sintes at IMDb
- FormulaTV.com
