= Ariadna abandonada =

Sculpture in Mexico City, Mexico

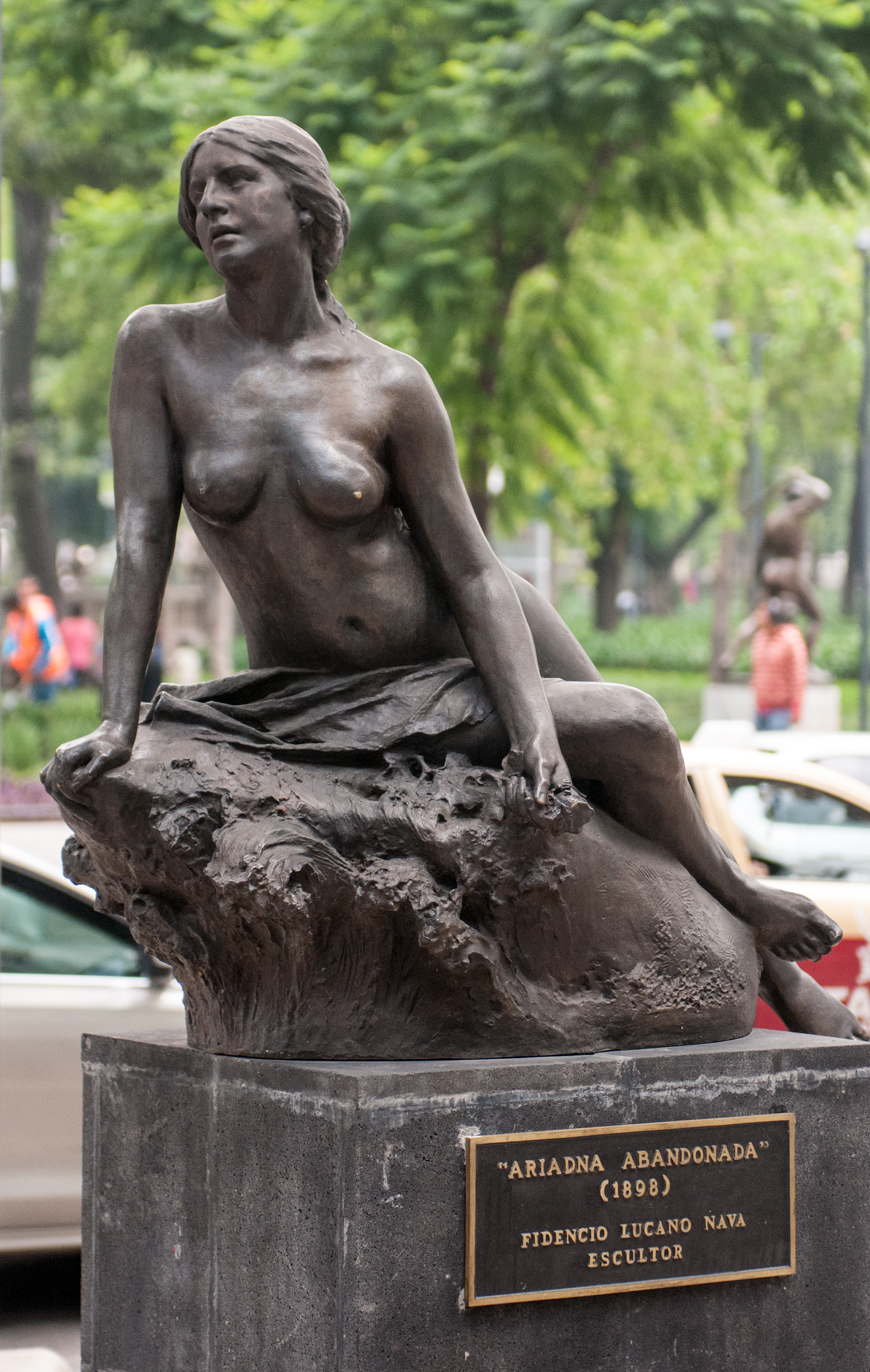
- The statue near Alameda Central, 2015
- Artist: Fidencio Lucano Nava
- Location: Mexico City, Mexico
- 19°26′5.6″N 99°8′43.4″W

Ariadna abandonada is a sculpture by Fidencio Lucano Nava (1869–1938). There is a statue in the collection of Museo Nacional de Arte, and a statue installed across from Alameda Central, in Mexico City.
