= Ariadna Chasovnikova =

Kazakh-Soviet politician

- Ариадна Леонидовна Часовникова
- Born: Ariadna Leonidovna Chasovnikova; 8 November 1918; Ust-Kamenogorsk, Russian Soviet Republic (now Oskemen, Kazakhstan)
- Died: 19 August 1988 (aged 69); Almaty, Kazakh Soviet Socialist Republic
- Occupations: chemical engineer, politician
- Years active: 1941–1978

Ariadna Chasovnikova (Kazakh: Ариадна Леонидовна Часовникова; Ariadna Leonidovna Chasovnikova, 8 November 1918 – 19 August 1988) was a Kazakh–Soviet politician who served as the Deputy Chair of the Presidium of the Supreme Soviet of the Kazakh SSR. She was honored for her service with the Order of the Red Banner of Labour and twice was awarded the Order of the Badge of Honour.

== Biography ==
Ariadna Leonidovna Chasovnikova was born on 8 November 1918 in Ust-Kamenogorsk. She grew up in a working-class neighborhood. Graduating from Tomsk State University, between 1941 and 1942, she worked as a chemical engineer in a plant that purified nitrogen. She joined the Communist Party of Kazakhstan and in 1942 was selected as the chair of the regional planning commission. After three years, she became the supervisor of economics for the USSR State Planning Committee for Kazakhstan and served in that post until 1949. That year, Chasovnikova was promoted to Deputy Chief of the Central Statistical Bureau for the Presidium of the Supreme Soviet of the USSR and worked her way up to the position of Chair, remaining with the Statistical Bureau until 1967.

Chasovnikova served as a deputy in the Supreme Soviet of the Kazakh SSR in 1963 and was re-elected in 1967. That same year, she was elected as the Deputy Chair of the Presidium of the Supreme Soviet of the Kazakh SSR and became a member of the Communist Party of the Caucasus' Central Committee. In 1975, she was the candidate for Deputy for the Uspen District of the Pavlodar Region. Before her retirement in 1978, she was honored for her service with the Order of the Red Banner of Labour. She also received the Order of the Badge of Honour on two occasions. Chasovnikova died on 19 August 1988 in Almaty.
