= Ololygon ariadne =

Conservation status
- Least Concern (IUCN 3.1)

Scientific classification
- Kingdom: Animalia
- Phylum: Chordata
- Class: Amphibia
- Order: Anura
- Family: Hylidae
- Genus: Ololygon
- Species: O. ariadne

Binomial name
- Ololygon ariadne (Bokermann, 1967)

Synonyms
- Scinax ariadne (Bokermann, 1967)

Species of frog

Ololygon ariadne is a species of frog in the family Hylidae. It is endemic to Brazil. Its natural habitats are subtropical or tropical moist lowland forests, subtropical or tropical moist montane forests, and rivers.
