= French ship Ariane =

Three submarines and one frigate of the French Navy have borne the name Ariane:

- French frigate Ariane (1811), a 40-gun frigate of the French Navy, lead ship of her class.
- French submarine Ariane (1914), an Amphitrite-class submarine launched in 1914 and sunk in 1917.
- French submarine Ariane (Q122), an Ariane-class submarine launched in 1925 and scuttled in 1942.
- French submarine Ariane (S640), an Aréthuse-class submarine launched in 1958 and struck in 1981.
