= HMS Ariadne (1805) =

Cutter of the Royal Navy

History

United Kingdom
- Name: Ariadne
- Builder: Cowes
- Launched: 1803
- Fate: Sold to the government July 1805

United Kingdom
- Name: HMS Ariadne
- Acquired: July 1805
- Renamed: HMS Dove 1805); HMS Flight (1806)
- Fate: Disappeared September 1806

General characteristics
- Type: Cutter
- Tons burthen: 187(bm)
- Propulsion: Sail
- Armament: 6 guns

HMS Ariadne was launched at Cowes in 1803 as the civilian vessel Ariadne. The Royal Navy purchased her in July 1805 as an advice boat and commissioned her under Lieutenant John Wells. It renamed her HMS Dove later that year, and then in 1806 renamed her HMS Flight.

In September 1806 Flight disappeared in the English Channel, and was presumed to have foundered with the loss of all hands.
