= Ariadne (1795 ship) =

US merchantman and UK slave ship 1797–1806

History

United States
- Builder: Newbury, Massachusetts
- Launched: 1795
- Fate: Sold? c.1801

United Kingdom
- Name: Ariadne
- Owner: 1801:Robert Kitchen & John Siller; 1803:James Penny; 1805:R. Thompson
- Acquired: c.1801
- Captured: 1806

General characteristics
- Tons burthen: 132, or 135 (bm)
- Sail plan: Snow, or ship
- Complement: 1803:25; 1805:25; 1806:25
- Armament: 1803:14 × 4&6-pounder guns; 1805:16 × 6&4-pounder guns; 1806:16 × 6&4-pounder guns

Ariadne was built in 1795 at Newbury, Massachusetts, probably under another name. She in 1801 became a Liverpool-based slave ship in the triangular trade in enslaved people. She made two voyages transporting enslaved people before a French, and later a Dutch privateer, captured her in 1804 while she was acquiring captives on her third voyage. However, a Liverpool-based vessel recaptured her. Then in 1806, a French privateer captured her and took her into Guadeloupe while Ariadne was on her fourth voyage transporting captives.

== Career ==
Ariadne first appeared in Lloyd's Register (LR) in 1803 with M'Bride, master, Kitchen, owner, and trade Liverpool–Africa. However, by then she had already completed one voyage transporting enslaved people.

=== 1st voyage transporting enslaved people (1801–1802) ===
Captain Thomas Mollett sailed from Liverpool on 6 September 1801. In 1801, 147 vessels sailed from British ports bound for Africa to acquire and transport enslaved people; 122 of these vessels sailed from Liverpool.

Ariadne delivered 161 captives at Demerara on 8 February 1802. She returned to Liverpool on 17 June 1802. She had left Liverpool with 23 crew members and she suffered 12 crew deaths on her voyage.

=== 2nd voyage transporting enslaved people (1802–1803) ===
Captain William McBride sailed from Liverpool on 1 August 1802. In 1802, 155 vessels sailed from British ports bound for Africa to acquire and transport enslaved people; 122 of these vessels sailed from Liverpool.

Ariadne acquired captives at Rio Pongo and delivered them to Demerara on 22 March 1803. She left Demerara on 24 April, and arrived back at Liverpool on 9 June 1803. She had left Liverpool with 20 crew members and she had suffered eight crew deaths on her voyage.

=== 3rd voyage transporting enslaved people (1803–1804) ===
Captain William McBride acquired a letter of marque on 11 July 1803. He sailed from Liverpool on 28 July 1803. In 1803, 99 vessels sailed from British ports bound for Africa to acquire and transport enslaved people; 83 of these vessels sailed from Liverpool.

Lloyd's List reported on 3 February 1804 that Ariadne, McBride, master, had arrived at Africa from Liverpool.

Lloyd's List reported on 6 March 1804 that a French privateer of 14 guns and 150 men had captured Ariadne, McBride, master, off Angola. Ariadne arrived at Montevideo on 30 December 1803. There she disembarked 18 captives, suggesting that she had only begun to acquire captives before she was captured.

In 1803, 11 British vessels engaged in the triangular trade were lost. One was lost on the coast of Africa. During the period 1793 to 1807, war, rather than maritime hazards or resistance by the captives, was the greatest cause of vessel losses among British enslaving vessels.

Lloyd's List reported on 24 August 1804 that Ariadne, Fiott, master, late McBride, had returned to Liverpool. The Dutch ship Hooe, fitted out at the Cape of Good Hope, had captured her off the coast of Africa, but Alexander, of Liverpool, had recaptured her. She arrived back at Liverpool on 20 August 1804.

Lloyd's Register for 1805 showed Ariadne with McBride, master, changing to J. Carrol, Kitchen & Co., owners, and trade Liverpool–Africa.

=== Voyage to Africa (1805) ===
Captain James Pierce Carroll acquired a letter of marque on 6 April 1805. Lloyd's List reported on 17 December 1805 that Ariadne, Carroll, master, had arrived at Cork from Africa.

=== 4th voyage transporting enslaved people (1806–Loss) ===
Captain Robert Thompson acquired a letter of marque on 18 March 1806. He left Liverpool on 7 April. Lloyd's List reported on 30 September that Ariadne, Thompson, master, had arrived at Loango from Liverpool.

== Fate ==
Lloyd's List reported on 28 November 1806, that the French privateer Guadaloupienne had captured Ariadne, of Liverpool and from Angola, and taken her into Guadaloupe.

In 1806, 33 British vessels engaged in the triangular trade were lost. Eight were lost in the Middle Passage, i.e., while sailing from Africa to the West Indies.
