= Ariane (automobile) =

French automobile

The Ariane was a French automobile made by Automobiles Ariane, Suresnes, Seine in 1907. It was a small friction drive two-seater using a single-cylinder 6 hp engine. The friction discs were mounted at the rear axle.
