= Ariadne (software) =

The European Knowledge Pool System Ariadne (acronym for Alliance of Remote Instructional Authoring and Distribution Networks for Europe) is a European association (or consortium) for sharing knowledge and fostering international cooperation in teaching that is open to the world.

Ariadne was initiated in 1996 by the European Commission's telematics for education and training program. Since then, an infrastructure has been developed in Belgium and Switzerland for the production of reusable learning content, including distributed storage and discovery, as well as its exploitation in structured courses. The core of this infrastructure is a distributed library of digital, reusable educational components called the Knowledge Pool System (KPS) in 2007 actively used in both academic and corporate contexts.

End users interact with the KPS through client tools. Java and web applications allow users to insert documents and their associated metadata into the KPS, search for relevant documents, and download them from the KPS. Java applications interact with the KPS through the ARIADNE Web Services. The ARIADNE Web Services provide an API that hides the database access details and also enables interoperability with other repositories.

The ARIADNE toolset contains the following components:

- The ARIADNE KPS Client
- SILO, the current Indexation- and Query tool for learning objects
- AMG, a component that leverages existing libraries for automatic metadata generation
- A LOM based Federated search engine, that dynamically searches other (more learning technology oriented) search systems like Lionshare, Merlot, Edna, NIME, etc.

The ARIADNE Knowledge Pool System distributed learning object repository for multicultural/multilingual teachers and learner is accessible through Sourceforge.

== See also ==
- List of content management systems
