= ARIANNA Experiment =

Proposed detector for ultra-high energy astrophysical neutrinos

Antarctic Ross Ice-Shelf Antenna Neutrino Array (ARIANNA) is a proposed detector for ultra-high energy astrophysical neutrinos. It will detect coherent radio Cherenkov emissions from the particle showers produced by neutrinos with energies above about 10^17 eV. ARIANNA will be built on the Ross Ice Shelf just off the coast of Antarctica, where it will eventually cover about 900 km^{2} in surface area. There, the ice-water interface below the shelf reflects radio waves, giving ARIANNA sensitivity to downward going neutrinos and improving its sensitivity to horizontally incident neutrinos. ARIANNA detector stations will each contain 4-8 antennas which search for brief pulses of 50 MHz to 1 GHz radio emission from neutrino interactions.

As of 2016, a prototype array consisting of 7 stations had been deployed, and was taking data. An initial search for neutrinos was made; none were found, and an upper limit was generated.
