= Ariadna Medina =

Mexican synchronized swimmer

Personal information
- Born: October 14, 1972 (age 53)

Sport
- Sport: Swimming
Medal record
Representing Mexico
Pan American Games
Bronze medal – third place	1999 Winnipeg	Team
Central American and Caribbean Games
Gold medal – first place	1993 Ponce	Team

Ariadna Medina (born 14 October 1972) is a Mexican former synchronized swimmer who competed in the 1996 Summer Olympics.
