= INS Ariadne =

East India Company ship

History

British East India Company
- Namesake: Ariadne
- Builder: John Laird, Birkenhead Iron Works
- Launched: December 1839
- Fate: Foundered 23 June 1842

General characteristics
- Type: Steam paddle sloop
- Tons burthen: 432 (bm)
- Length: 139 ft (42.4 m)
- Beam: 26 ft (7.9 m)
- Propulsion: 70hp steam engine
- Armament: 3 guns

INS Ariadne was a flat-bottomed iron paddle steamer built in England in 1839 for the Indian Navy of the Bombay Government of the British East India Company. She was shipped to India in pieces and assembled at the Bombay Dockyard in 1840. She sailed from India to join the British fleet off Shanghai, China, during the First Opium War but was damaged and later foundered on 23 June 1842.

== Origin ==
Ariadne and Medusa were sent out because of the outbreak of war with China. The Bombay Dockyard's steam department assembled the two vessels.

== Fate ==
On 8 June 1842 the British fleet rendezvoused off the Amherst Rocks (31°11′N 122°22′E). Ariadne, Lieutenant John Roberts, had recently come out from India to join the fleet. She struck on the point of a rock 71/4 miles W by S1/4S from the Amherst Rocks. The rock, which became known for a time as Ariadne Rock, had three to five feet of water on it at the time of the accident.

Striking the rock knocked a hole in Ariadne's bottom and the engine-room compartment filled with water. Lieutenant Roberts promptly got a sail under her bottom. Once the leak was under control, INS Sesostris towed Ariadne to Chusan; Sesostris then returned to the fleet.

When Ariadne arrived at Chusan she was run ashore for repairs. Lieutenant Roberts imprudently refloated her on the night of 23 June. She then slid off a mud bank and sank in ten fathoms of water. Her officers and crew escaped, but three Chinese drowned. It was found impossible to raise her. The EIC suspended Roberts from duty.
