= Bertha Lutz =

Brazilian scientist and politician (1894–1976)

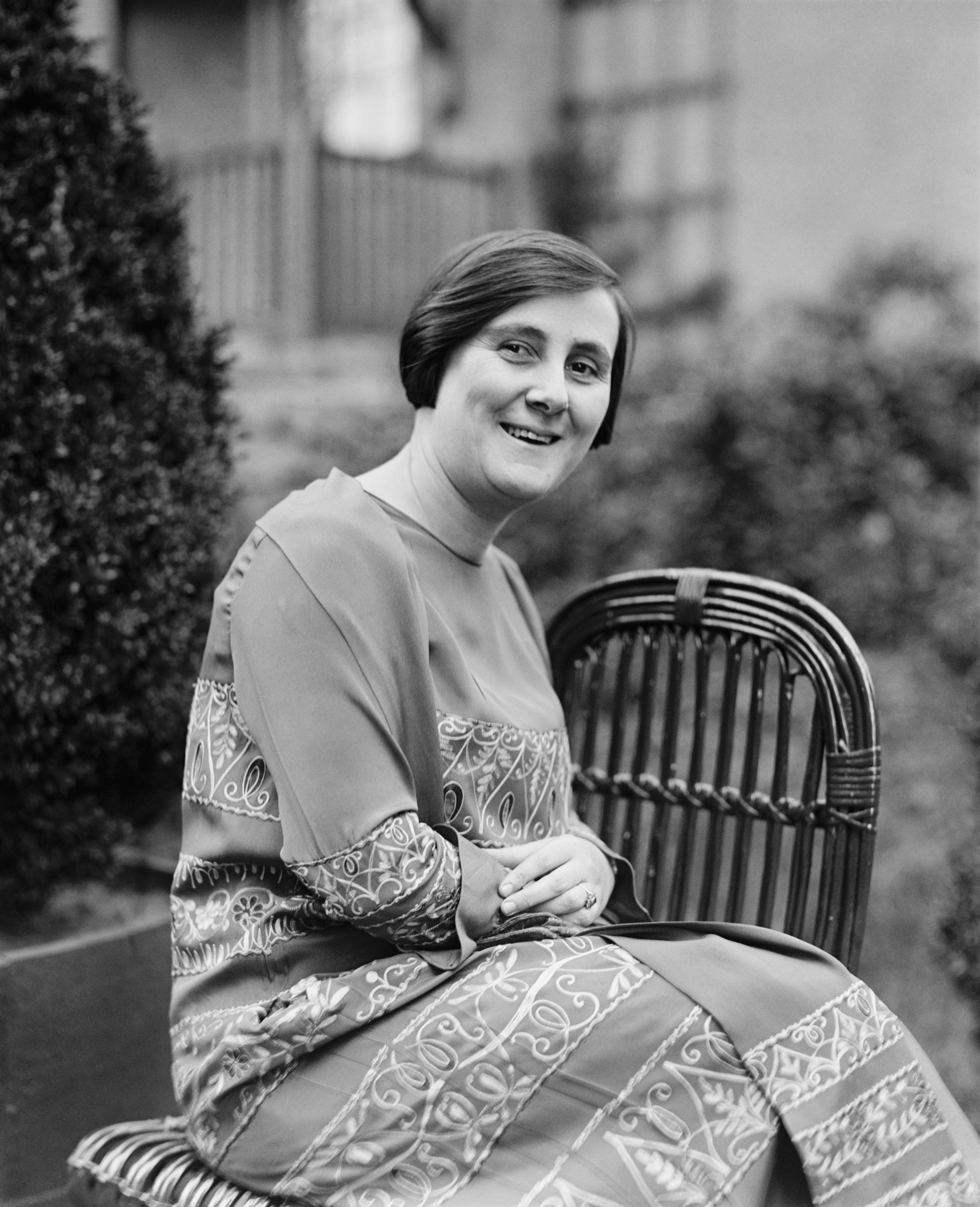
- Lutz in 1925
- Born: Bertha Maria Júlia Lutz; 2 August 1894; São Paulo, Brazil
- Died: 16 September 1976 (aged 82); Rio de Janeiro, Brazil
- Other name: Lutz Berta
- Occupation: Scientist

Bertha Maria Júlia Lutz (2 August 1894 – 16 September 1976) was a Brazilian zoologist, politician, and diplomat. Lutz became a leading figure in both the Pan American feminist movement and human rights movement. She was instrumental in gaining women's suffrage in Brazil and represented her country at the United Nations Conference on International Organization, signing her name to the United Nations Charter and championing the inclusion of Article 8 in the Charter. In addition to her political work, she was a naturalist at the National Museum of Brazil, specializing in poison dart frogs. She has four frog species and two lizard species named after her.

== Early life and education ==
Bertha Lutz was born on 2 August 1894, in São Paulo, Brazil. She was born to a British mother and a Brazilian father. Her father, Adolfo Lutz (1855–1940), was a pioneering physician and epidemiologist of Swiss origin, and her mother, Amy Marie Gertrude Fowler, was a British nurse. In her teenage years, she grew interested in the women's rights. Bertha Lutz studied natural sciences, biology and zoology at the University of Paris – Sorbonne graduating in 1918. Soon after obtaining her degrees, she returned to Brazil. Later, she would attend the Federal University of Rio de Janeiro, graduating in 1933 with a law degree. While in Europe, she also was introduced to and inspired by the militant suffrage movement.

== Career ==
=== Early Brazilian women's organizations ===
Bertha Lutz returned to Brazil in 1918 after her seven-year academic career in Paris. Upon her return, she joined the Legiao da Mulher Brasilera (Brazilian Women's Legion) as an administrative director of a commission. The established goal of the organization, founded by Alice Rego Monterio in 1919, was to provide organized social services for women in Brazil. After gaining organizational experience, Bertha Lutz cofounded a new organization, the Liga para a Emancipação Intelectual da Mulher (The League for Intellectual Emancipation of Women), with Maria Lacerda da Moura in 1920. This organization advocated for the inclusion of women in scientific areas. In 1922, Lutz established Federação Brasileira pelo Progresso Feminino (the Brazilian Federation for the Advancement of Women, FBPF). This organization was different as it included women from across Brazil and created a national platform focused on socio-economic issues affecting women. After some time, the FBPF broadened the focus on socio-economic issues to include the right to vote. Within the first year of the FBPF's creation, Lutz and other members organized an international convention to take place in Brazil, which was attended by dignitaries within Brazil and from foreign nations, including notable feminists like Carrie Chapman Catt, Ana de Castro Osorio and Rosa Manus.

=== Inter-American feminist and suffrage campaigns ===
The FBPF began advocating for women's rights and extending suffrage to women across the American states, campaigns Lutz also participated in. She served as a delegate to the Pan-American Conference of Women in Baltimore, Maryland in 1922, and would continue to attend women's rights conferences in the years to follow. In 1925, she was elected president of the Inter-American Union of Women. Lutz's involvement in the fight for women's suffrage made her the leading Brazilian figure of women's rights until the end of 1931, when Brazilian women finally gained the right to vote.

Lutz's advocacy for the rights of women did not end with the right to vote, and she continued to play a prominent role in feminist campaigns. In 1933, after obtaining her law degree from the Federal University of Rio de Janeiro Faculty of Law, Lutz introduced several proposals for gender equity at the Inter-American Conference of Montevideo, Uruguay. Most notable of these proposals was her call for the Inter-American Commission of Women to focus on issues of gender equality in the workplace.

In 1935, Lutz decided to run for a seat in the National Congress of Brazil and came in second behind Cándido Pessoa. She replaced him when he died a year later, making Lutz one of the few Brazilian Congresswomen of the era. The first initiative that Lutz presented while in Congress was the creation of the "Statute of Women", a committee to analyze every Brazilian law and statute to ensure none violated the rights of women.

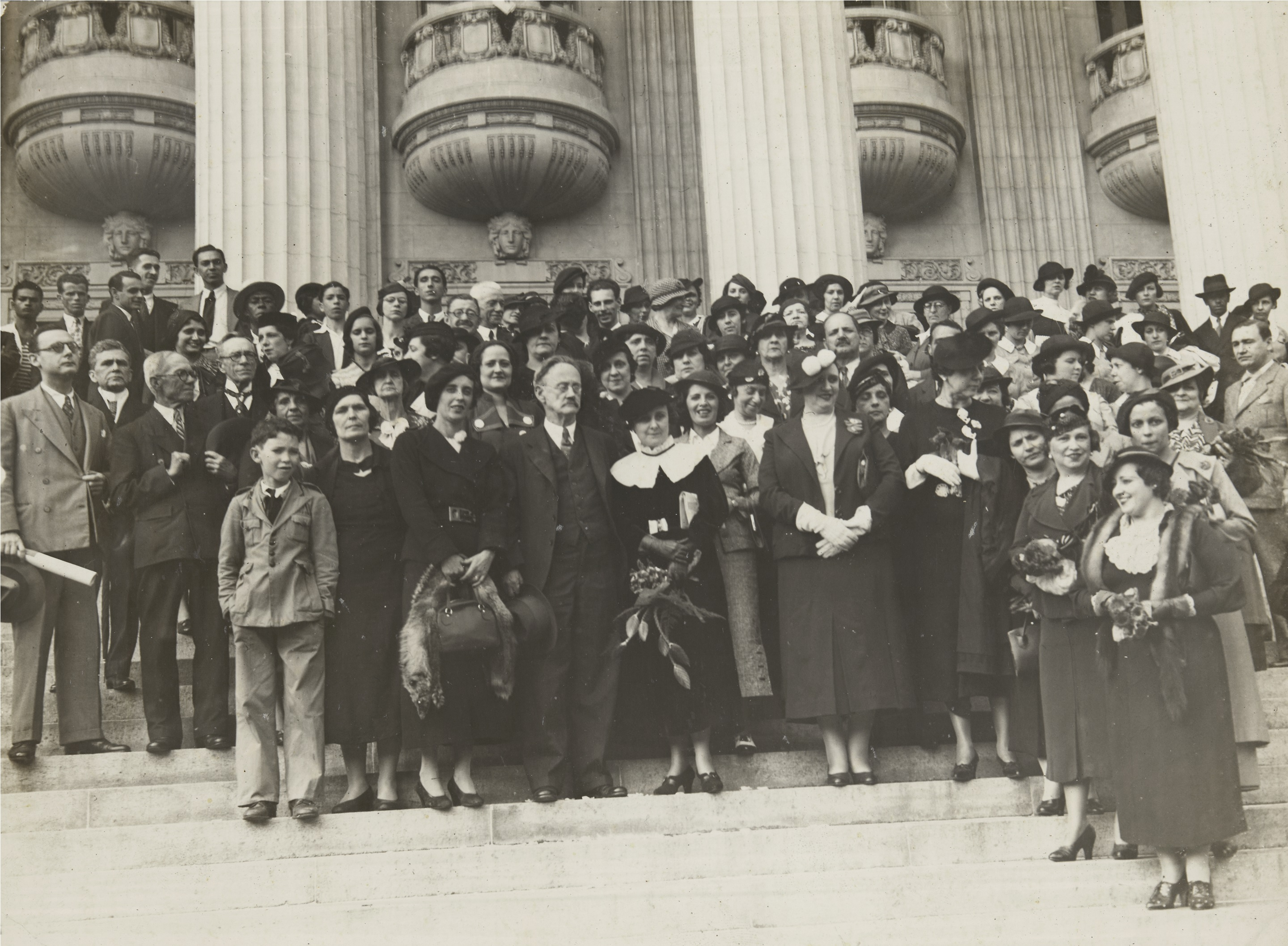
Bertha Lutz with family, feminists, and the Brazilian Federation for Women's Progress on the stairs of the Chamber of Deputies, Rio de Janeiro. (1936)

Lutz, however, was unable to push forward her measures after Getúlio Vargas was reinstated as dictator in 1937, which led to a suspension of parliament, and the Statute project. Lutz nonetheless continued her diplomatic career. She was one of the four women to sign the United Nations Charter at the Inter-American Conference of Women held in San Francisco in 1945. She also served as vice president of the Inter-American Commission of Women from 1953 to 1959.

=== Political conferences ===
At the 1922 Pan-American Conference of Women, Lutz advocated for the equality of rights and opportunity of women, with a special focus on political inclusion.

Lutz came prepared to the 1933 Inter-American Conference of Montevideo with a study of the legal status of women in the Americas, and advocated that the nationality of married women should not be contingent on that of their husbands. She also proposed an Equals Rights Treaty and pushed the Inter-American Commission of Women to refocus and recommit to analyzing working conditions of women in the Americas.

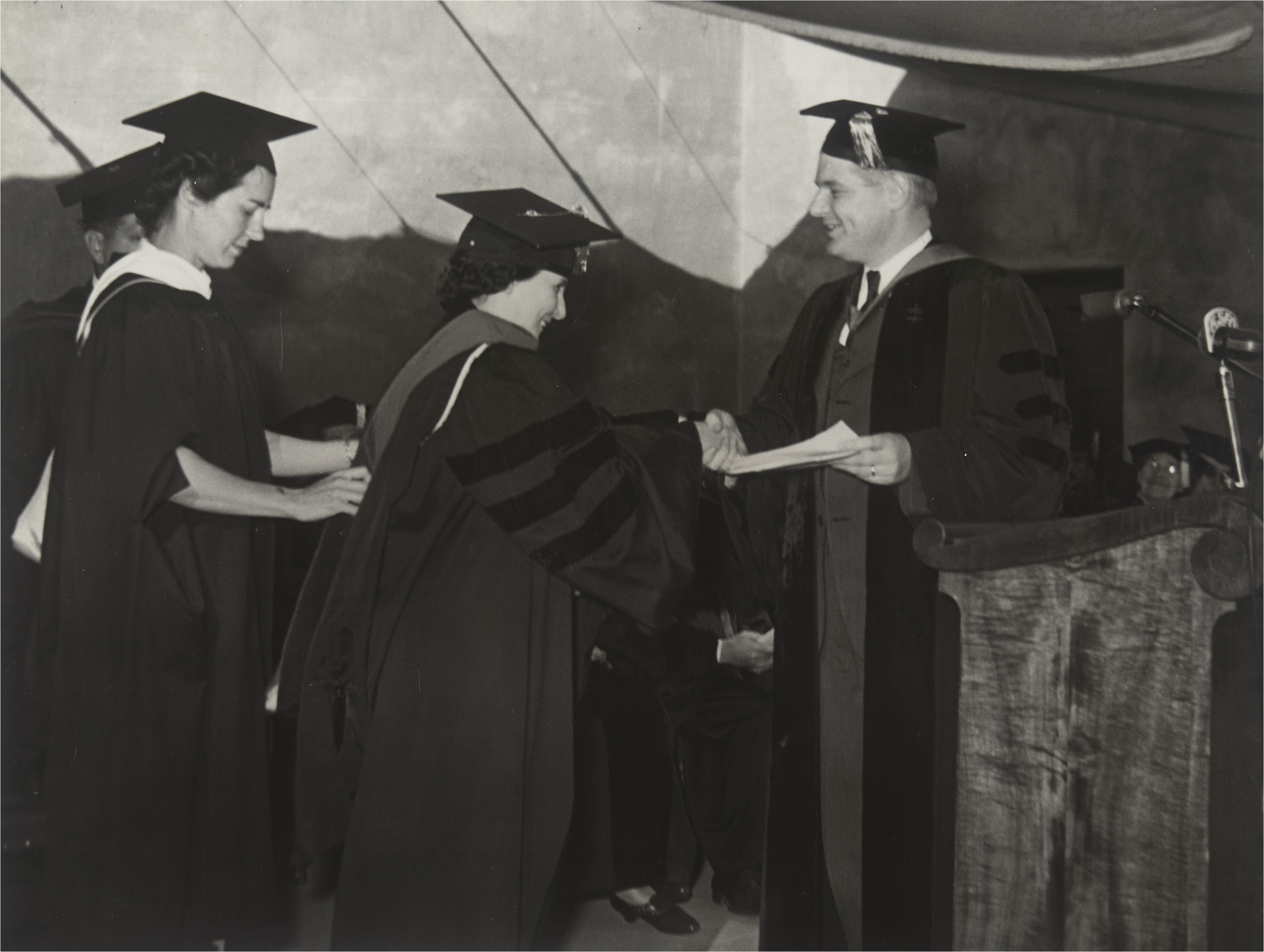
Lutz receiving the Doutor Honoris Causa (Mills College, 1945)

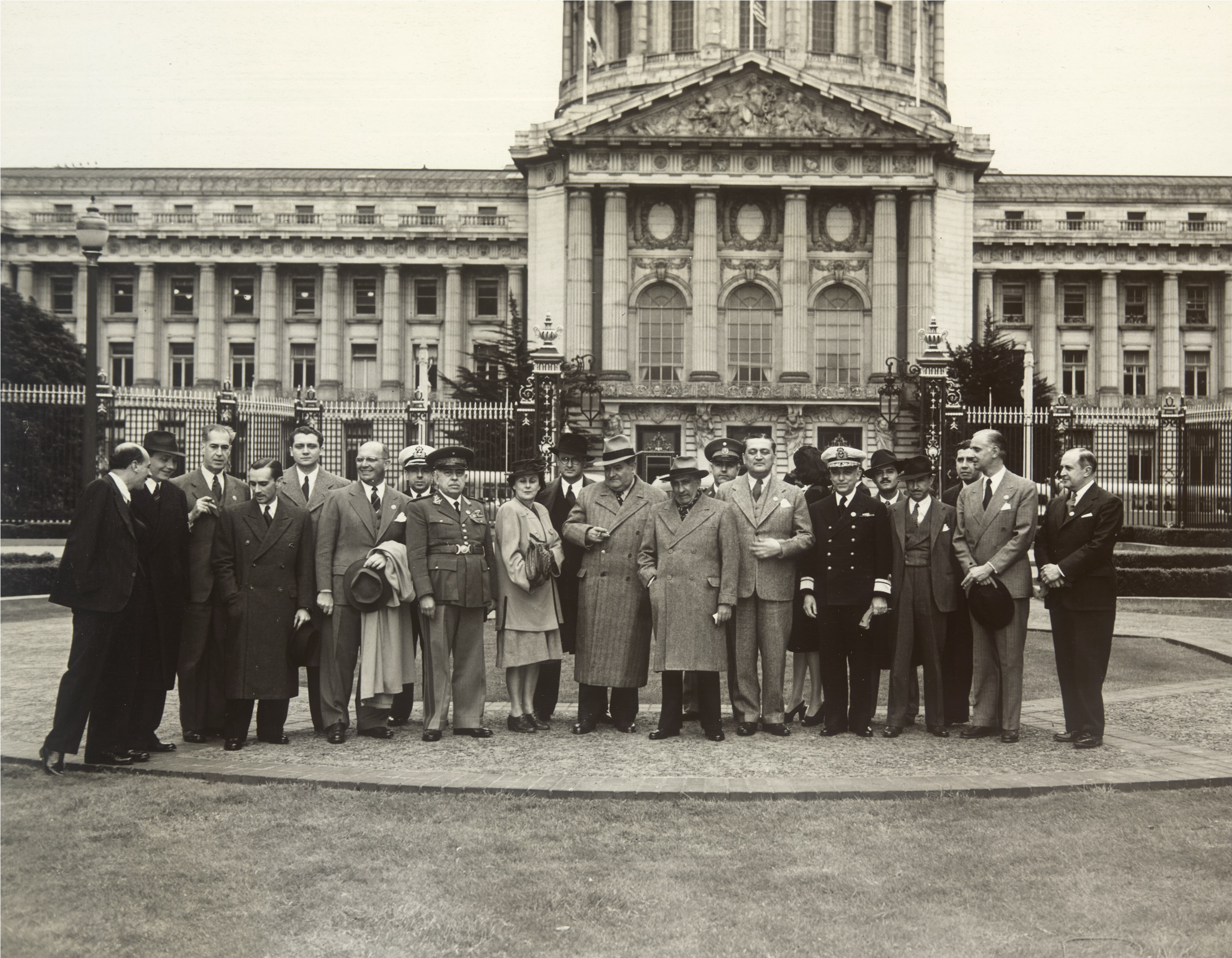
Lutz at the UN conference (San Francisco, 1945)

During the 1945 United Nations Conference on International Organization in San Francisco, Lutz, along with Minerva Bernardino, fought for the inclusion of the word "women" in the preamble to the United Nations Charter. The first draft did not mention the word "women", and against the wishes of US delegate Virginia Gildersleeve and some British female advisors, Lutz and other women from Latin America insisted in the final clause read: " ...faith in fundamental human rights, in the dignity of the human person, in the equal rights of men and women and of nations large and small". She further proposed the UN create a special commission whose purpose it would be to analyze the "legal status of women" around the world in order to better understand the inequalities they faced and be better prepared to combat them. She is credited with being the most prominent and tenacious advocate for the inclusion of women's rights in the UN Charter, and without her work the United Nations would likely not have a mandate to protect women's rights.

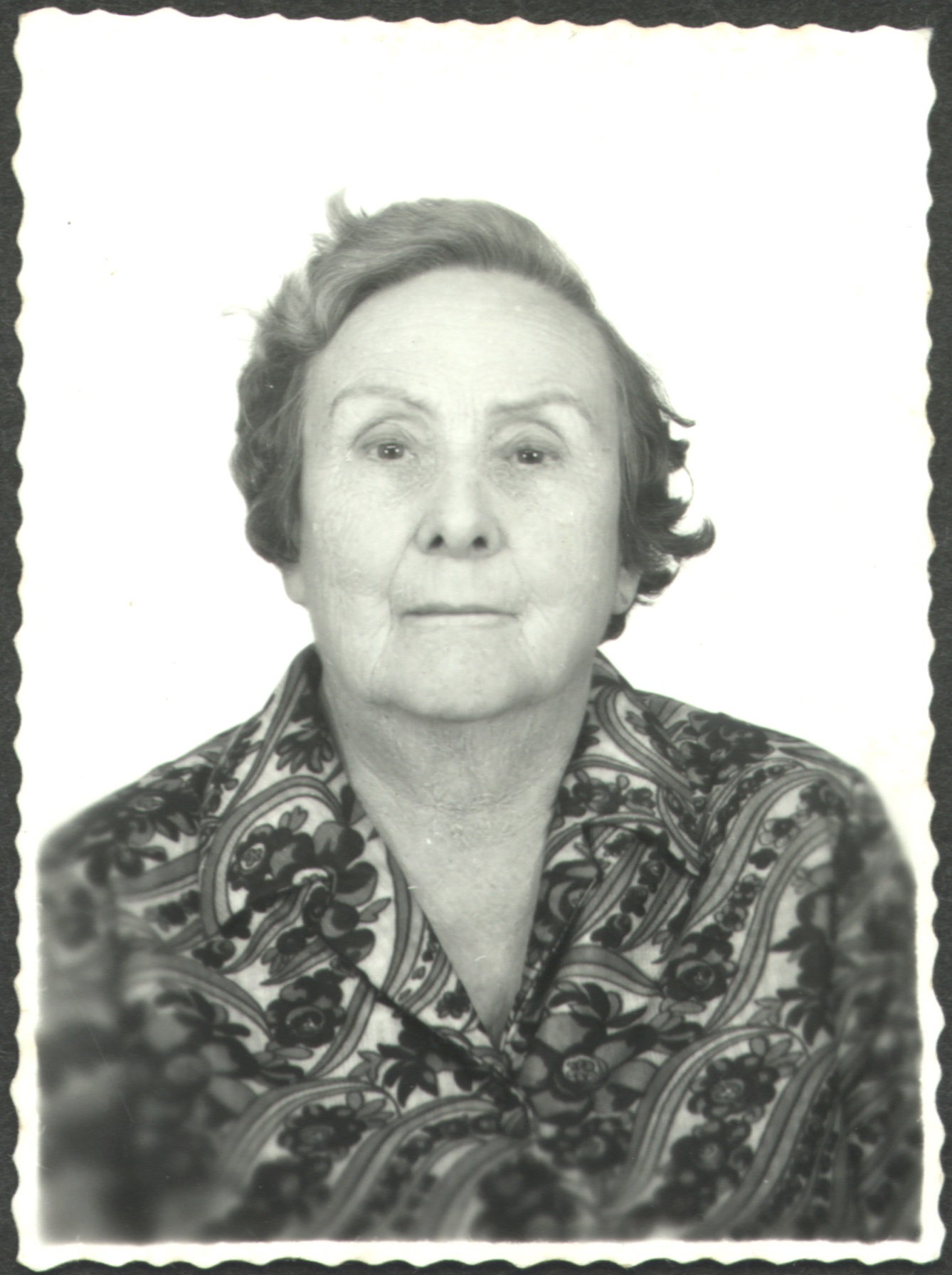
Lutz in later years.

In 1964, Lutz headed the Brazilian delegation at the 14th Inter-American Commission in Montevideo. Additionally, at the 15th annual meeting of the Inter-American Commission of Women held in 1970, she proposed to hold a seminar dedicated to addressing the specific problems faced by indigenous women. Although she was a little over seventy at this stage of her life, Lutz continued to attend conferences and push for the expansion of women's rights, including the World Conference on Women, 1975, in Mexico City.

=== Scientific career ===
After returning to Brazil in 1918, Lutz dedicated herself to the study of amphibians, especially poison dart frogs and frogs of the family Hylidae. In 1919, she was hired by the Museu Nacional do Rio de Janeiro. She later became a naturalist at the Section of Botany. Throughout her lifetime, Lutz would publish numerous scientific studies and publications, most notably "Observations on the life history of the Brazilian Frog" (1943), "A notable frog chorus in Brazil" (1946), and "New frogs from Itatiaia mountain" (1952). In 1958, she described what is now known as Lutz's rapids frog (Paratelmatobius lutzii Lutz and Carvalho, 1958), which is named in honor of her father.

Lutz is honored in the names of two species of Brazilian lizards, Liolaemus lutzae and Phyllopezus lutzae, as well as four species of frogs, Pristimantis lutzae, Dendropsophus berthalutzae, Megaelosia lutzae, and Scinax berthae.

Bertha Lutz's collections held at the Museu Nacional in Rio de Janeiro were destroyed in the fire that devastated most of the museum's collections in September 2018.

== Selected works ==
- "Observations on the life history of the Brazilian Frog" (1943)
- "A notable frog chorus in Brazil" (1946)
- "New frogs from Itatiaia mountain" (1952).

== Death ==
She died in 1976 at the age of 82. The Diploma Bertha Lutz for notable Brazilian women is named in her honor.

== See also ==
- Women's suffrage
- Feminism in Brazil
