= Ariana (name) =

- Pronunciation: UK: /æriˈænə/; US: /ɑːriˈɑːnə/
- Gender: Female

Origin
- Origin: Greek
- Meaning: "Most holy" or "very pure"

Other names
- See also: Ariadna, Ariadne

Ariana is a Latin feminine given name. Arianna and Ariane are the two most common variations. It derives from the Greek origin name Ariadne.

== Etymology ==
The name Ariana is the Latinized form of the Ancient Greek name Ariadne (Doric Greek: αρι αδνος; Ancient Greek: Ἀριάδνη; Latin: Ariadna; "most holy"), the daughter of Minos, King of Crete, and his queen Pasiphaë, daughter of Helios, the god of the sun, from Greek mythology.

Ariana, a term in classical history, from Latin Arianus, Ariana, from Greek Arianē, Areianē, names applied in classical times to the eastern part of ancient Iran and to its inhabitants. Ancient Iranians used the name in reference to themselves (Old Persian ariya-), hence Iran. Ultimately from Sanskrit arya- "compatriot;" in later language "noble, of good family.", was a general geographical term used by some Greek and Roman authors of antiquity for an extensive territory in Central Asia, comprising the eastern part of the Persian empire, now all of Afghanistan and a part of Iran and southeast of Tajikistan. The name of Iran (Persia) originates from the Old Persian word airiyanem (Ariana) meaning "[The Land] of the Aryans".

Ariana is sometimes used as a Welsh name, an elaboration of Welsh: arian “silver.”

== Name days ==
- Greece: 18 September.
- Latvia: 22 February.
- Poland: 17 September.
- Russia: 1 October.

== Popularity ==
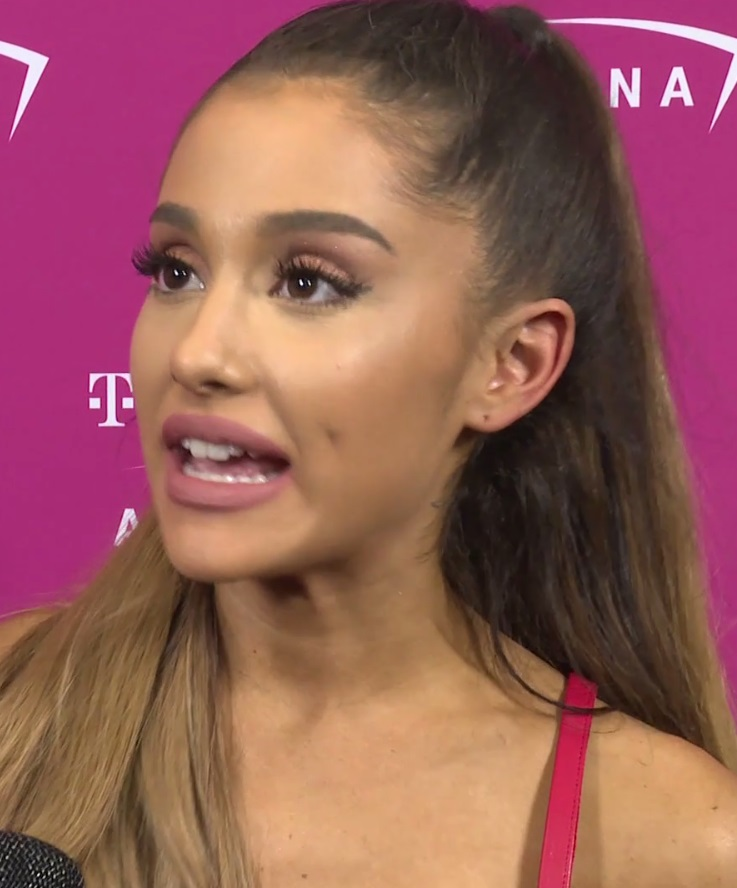
Singer Ariana Grande

In the United States, the name Ariana peaked at the 30th most popular name for baby girls in 2014, and was in the top 40th to 100th most popular names during the first and second decades of the 21st century. Arianna also peaked in 2014, at 40th place, and was in the top 50 to low 100s range in the same period.

== Notable people ==
=== Ariana ===
- Ariana Arias (born 2003), Spanish footballer
- Ariana Arseneault (born 2002), Canadian tennis player
- Ariana Barouk (born 1982), Cuban model
- Ariana Berlin (born 1987), American gymnast and actor
- Ariana Chris (born 1975), Canadian opera singer
- Ariana DeBose (born 1991), American actress, singer and dancer
- Ariana Geerlings (born 2005), Spanish tennis player
- Ariana Gillis (born 1990), Canadian singer-songwriter
- Ariana Grande (born 1993), American singer, songwriter and actress
- Ariana Greenblatt (born 2007), American actress
- Ariana Guido (born 1999), American actress and comedian
- Ariana Harwicz (born 1977), Argentine writer, screenwriter, playwright and documentary maker
- Ariana Hilborn (born 1980), US-born Latvian long-distance runner
- Ariana Ince (born 1989), American track and field athlete specializing in the javelin throw
- Ariana Jacob, artist based in Portland, Oregon, in the United States
- Ariana Jollee (born 1982), American pornographic actress
- Ariana Kelly (born 1976), American politician
- Ariana Kukors (born 1989), American swimmer
- Ariana Madix (born 1985), American television personality, model, actress and businesswoman
- Ariana Austin Makonnen (born 1984), American philanthropist
- Ariana Miyamoto (born 1994), Japanese model
- Ariana Moorer (born 1991), American basketball player
- Ariana Nozeman (1626–1661), Dutch actress
- Ariana Ramsey (born 2000), American rugby player
- Ariana Reines (born 1982), American poet and activist
- Ariana Richards (born 1979), American actress and painter
- Ariana Rockefeller (born 1982), American fashion designer
- Ariana Rodriguez (born 1990), Puerto Rican model
- Ariana Savalas (born 1987), American musician
- Ariana Tibon-Kilma, Marshallese nuclear justice activist
- Ariana Tikao (born 1971), New Zealand singer, musician and author

=== Arianna ===
- Arianna Acuti (born 1996), Italian professional footballer
- Arianna Afsar (born 1991), American beauty pageant contestant and semi-finalist on American Idol
- Arianna Barbieri (born 1989), Italian swimmer
- Arianna Bergamaschi (born 1975), Italian singer, stage actress and television presenter
- Arianna Bogatec (born 1969), Italian sailor
- Arianna Bridi (born 1995), Italian swimmer
- Arianna Caruso (born 1999), Italian professional footballer
- Arianna Castiglioni (born 1997), Italian breaststroke swimmer
- Arianna Clarke (born 1999), retired Australian rules footballer
- Arianna Criscione (born 1985), Italian American former professional soccer goalkeeper
- Arianna De Masi (born 1999), Italian sprinter
- Arianna Del Giaccio (born 2002), known professionally as Ariete, Italian singer-songwriter.
- Arianna Errigo (born 1988), Italian foil fencer
- Arianna Farfaletti Casali (born 1976), former Italian-born Swiss female pole vaulter
- Arianna Fidanza (born 1995), Italian professional racing cyclist
- Arianna Follis (born 1977), Italian cross-country skier
- Arianna Fontana (born 1990), Italian short-track speed skater
- Arianna Garibotti (born 1989), Italian water polo player
- Arianna Huffington (born 1950), a co-founder of Huffington Post
- Arianna Hunsicker (born 2003), Canadian Paralympic swimmer
- Arianna Losano (born 1994), Italian curler
- Arianna Neikrug (born 1993), American jazz singer, songwriter, and arranger
- Arianna Noseda (born 1997), Italian lightweight rower
- Arianna Occhipinti, Italian winemaker and winery owner
- Arianna Perilli (born 1978), Sammarinese professional target shooter
- Arianna Puello (born 1977), Spanish composer, rapper and actress
- Arianna Rivas (born 2001), American actress and model
- Arianna Romero (born 1992), American-born Mexican footballer
- Arianna W. Rosenbluth (1927–2020), American physicist
- Arianna Sanna (born 1998), Dominican Republic swimmer
- Arianna Savall (born 1972), Swiss-born Spanish classical singer, harpist, and composer
- Arianna Schivo (born 1986), Italian Olympic eventing rider
- Arianna Sessi (born 1999), Italian professional racing cyclist
- Arianna Talamona (born 1994), Italian Paralympic swimmer
- Arianna Valcepina (born 1994), Italian short track speed skater
- Arianna Valloni (born 2001), Sammarinese swimmer
- Arianna Vanderpool-Wallace (born 1990), a swimmer from the Bahamas
- Arianna Zukerman (born 1972), American lyric soprano

=== Ariane ===
- Princess Ariane of the Netherlands (born 2007)
- Ariane Andrew (born 1987), American professional wrestler and manager
- Ariane Ascaride (born 1954), French actress and screenwriter
- Louise Bourgoin (born 1981), birth name Ariane Bourgoin, French actress
- Ariane Brodier (born 1979), French television personality, actress, TV host and humorist
- Ariane Burgess (born 1965), Scottish politician
- Ariane Burri (born 2000), Swiss snowboarder
- Ariane Carnelossi (born 1992), Brazilian mixed martial artist
- Ariane Ehrat (born 1961), Swiss former alpine skier
- Ariane Forster (1962–2010), German singer best known by the stage name Ari Up
- Ariane Friedrich (born 1984), German high jumper
- Ariane Hingst (born 1979), German retired football player
- Ariane Koizumi (born 1963), model and actress
- Ariane Labed (born 1984), French actress
- Ariane Laroux (born 1957), Franco-Swiss painter, draughtsman and printmaker
- Ariane Mnouchkine (born 1939), French stage director
- Ariane Moffatt (born 1979), Québécois singer-songwriter
- Ariane Schluter (born 1966), Dutch actress
- Ariane Schréder, French writer
- Ariane Sherine (born 1980), British comedy writer and journalist
- Ariane Tabatabai (born 1980), Iranian-American political science expert and advisor of USA Department of Defense

=== Ariarne ===
- Ariarne Titmus (born 2000), Australian swimmer

=== Ariyan ===
- Ariyan A. Johnson (born 1976), American actress, director, dancer and choreographer

=== Aryana ===
- Aryana Harvey (born 1997), American soccer player
- Aryana Sayeed (born 1985), Afghan singer
- Aryana Engineer (born 2001), Canadian actress

=== Fictional characters ===
- Ariana, protagonist of the adventure comic Anne Bonnie
- Ariana Dumbledore, a character in J.K. Rowling's Harry Potter series
- Ariana the Firefighter Fairy, a character in the Rainbow Magic book series
- Arianna Hernandez, a character in the soap opera Days of our Lives
- Arianna Horton, a character in the soap opera Days of our Lives
- Arianna "Ari" Langley, the main protagonist of Mary Stanton's Unicorns of Balinor book series.
- Arianna Rossi, a main supporting character in the Stravaganza series by Mary Hoffman
- Ariane, the lead female character in Ariane et Barbe-bleue, an opera by Paul Dukas
- Ariane, the lead female character in Love in the Afternoon (1957 film)
- Ariane Yeong, a protagonist in the video game Signalis
- Arianne Martell, a character in G.R.R. Martin's The song of Ice and Fire series
- Queen Arianna, a supporting character of Tangled: The Series in which she is the birth mother of Rapunzel
- Auriana, one of the main characters in the animated series LoliRock
- Lisia, a non-player character in Pokémon Omega Ruby and Alpha Sapphire, known as Ariana in the Spanish translations

== See also ==
- Ariana (disambiguation)
- Arianna (disambiguation)
- Ariadne (disambiguation)
