= Ariadna (given name) =

- Gender: Feminine
- Language: Cretan Greek

Origin
- Meaning: “Most holy”

Other names
- Related names: Ariadne, Ariana, Ariane, Arianna, Arianne

Ariadna is the Catalan, Polish, Russian, and Spanish form of the Cretan Greek name Ariadne, which means “most holy”.

== Women ==
- Ariadna Cabrol, Spanish actress and model
- Ariadna Capiró (born 1983), Cuban basketball player
- Ariadna Chasovnikova (1918–1988), Kazakh–Soviet politician
- Ariadna Chueca Moreno (born 1991), Spanish basketball referee
- Ariadna Cîrligeanu (born 2001), Romanian politician
- Ariadna Edo Beltrán (born 1998), Spanish partially sighted paralympic swimmer
- Ariadna Efron (1912–1975), Russian poet, memoirist, artist, art critic, and translator of prose and poetry
- Ariadna Gil (born 1969), Spanish actress
- Ariadna Gutiérrez Arévalo (born 1993), Colombian actress, model and beauty pageant titleholder who was crowned Miss Colombia 2014
- Ariadna Gutiérrez Arzaluz (born 1991), Mexican professional racing cyclist
- Ariadna Medina (born 1972), Mexican former synchronized swimmer and Olympian
- Ariadna Mikeshina (1900–1982), Russian-born pianist and composer
- Ariadna Mingueza (born 2003), Spanish footballer
- Ariadna Nevado (born 2000), Spanish professional racing cyclist
- Ariadna Romero (born 1986), Cuban model and actress
- Ariadna Scriabina (1905–1944), Russian poet and activist of the French Resistance, who co-founded the Zionist resistance group Armée Juive
- Ariadna Shengelaya (born 1937), Soviet actress
- Ariadna Sintes (born 1986), Cuban-Spanish actress
- Ariadna Trias (born 1995), Spanish professional racing cyclist
- Ariadna Tudel Cuberes (born 1978), Andorran road cyclist and ski mountaineer
- Ariadna Tyrkova-Williams (1869–1962), Russian-born liberal politician, journalist, writer and feminist
- Ariadna Welter (1930–1998), Mexican film actress
- Ariadna Yakusheva (1934-2012), Russian poet, bard, radio journalist, writer
