= Cretan literature =

Literature of Crete

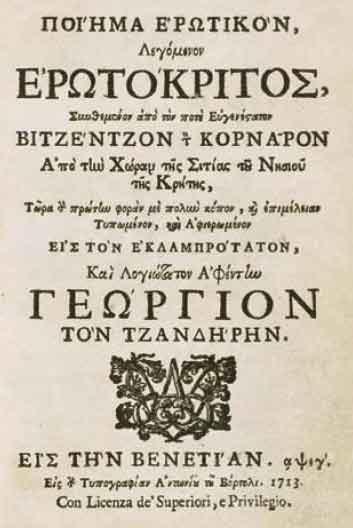
A copy of Erotokritos released in 1713

Medieval works suggest that Modern Greek started shaping as early as the 10th century, with one of the first works being the epic poem of Digenis Acritas. However, the first literary activity that was important enough to be identified as "modern Greek literature" was done in the Cretan dialect during the 16th century in Venetian Crete.

The Cretan Renaissance poem Erotokritos is undoubtedly the masterpiece of Cretan literature and a supreme achievement of modern Greek literature. It is a romantic work written around 1600 by Vitsentzos Kornaros (1553-1613). In over 10,000 lines of rhyming fifteen-syllable couplets, the poet relates the trials and tribulations suffered by two young lovers, Erotokritos and Aretousa, daughter of Heracles, King of Athens. It was a tale that enjoyed enormous popularity among its Greek readership.

The other major representative of Cretan literature was Georgios Chortatzis, and his most notable work was Erofili, which was characterized by Kostis Palamas as the first work of the modern Greek theatre. Other plays include The Sacrifice of Abraham by Kornaros, Panoria and Katsourbos by Chortatzis, Fortounatos by Markos Antonios Foskolos, King Rodolinos by Andreas Troilos, Stathis (comedy), and Voskopoula by unknown artists. During this period, there was production of different theatrical genres, such as tragedies, comedies, and pastoral and religious plays.

The flourishing Cretan school was all but terminated by the Ottoman capture of the island in the late 17th century. A major work was completed by the Cretan writer Marinos Tzanes entitled The Cretan War (O Kritikos Polemos) Ο Κρητικός Πόλεμος 1681, describing the war.

Many Greek authors have integrated Cretan literary elements in their respective works. Among these authors was Nikos Kazantzakis, who was known for his literary contributions mainly written in standard Greek. This paradigm, overall, has helped Kazantzakis to write significant works such as Zorba the Greek and thus establish for himself recognition in various international circles. His Captain Michalis—set in 19th-century Crete—is notable for using many Cretan Greek words and idioms, the book's popularity making them widely known to other Greeks.

== See also ==
- Cretan School
- Cretan Greek
