= Greek literature =

Greek literature dates back to ancient Greek literature, beginning around 800 BC, and extends to modern Greek literature today.

Ancient Greek literature was written in an Ancient Greek dialect, literature ranges from the oldest surviving written works until works from approximately the fifth century AD. This time period is divided into the Preclassical, Classical, Hellenistic, and Roman periods. Preclassical Greek literature primarily revolved around myths and include the works of Homer; the Iliad and the Odyssey. The Classical period saw the dawn of drama and history. Three philosophers are especially notable: Socrates, Plato, and Aristotle. During the Roman era, significant contributions were made in a variety of subjects, including history, philosophy, and the sciences.

Byzantine literature, the literature of the Byzantine Empire, was written in Atticizing, Medieval and early Modern Greek. Chronicles, distinct from historics, arose in this period. Encyclopedias also flourished in this period.

Modern Greek literature is written in common Modern Greek. The Cretan Renaissance poem Erotokritos is one of the most significant works from this time period. Adamantios Korais and Rigas Feraios are two of the most notable figures.

== Ancient Greek literature (c. 800 BC – c. AD 330) ==
Ancient Greek literature refers to literature written in Ancient Greek dialects. These works range from the oldest surviving written works in the Greek language until works from the fifth century AD. The Greek language arose from the proto-Indo-European language; roughly two-thirds of its words can be derived from various reconstructions of the tongue. A number of alphabets and syllabaries had been used to render Greek, but surviving Greek literature was written in a Phoenician-derived alphabet that arose primarily in Greek Ionia and was fully adopted by Athens by the fifth century BC.

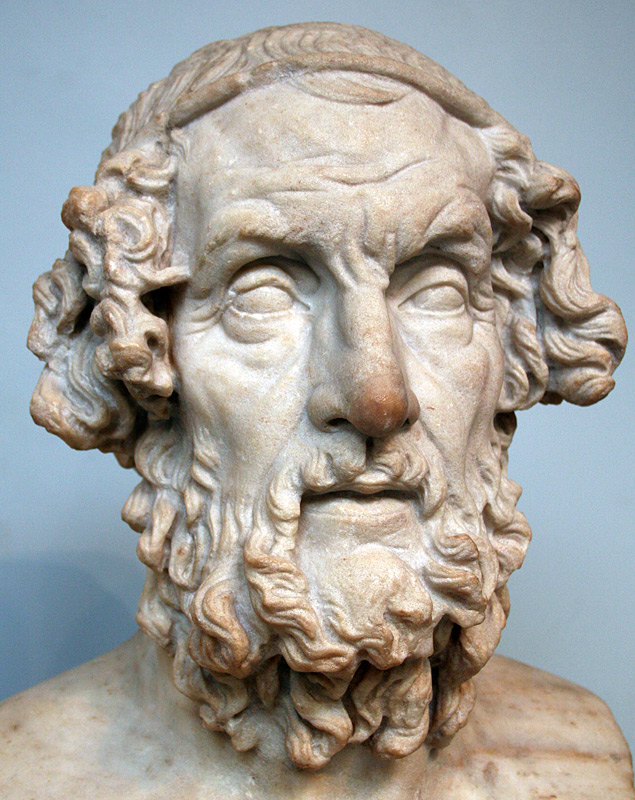
Idealized portrayal of Homer

=== Preclassical (c. 800 – c. 500 BC) ===
All ancient Greek literature was to some degree oral in nature, and the earliest literature was completely so. The Greeks created poetry before making use of writing for literary purposes. Poems created in the Preclassical period were meant to be sung or recited (writing was little known before the 7th century BC). Most poems focused on myths, legends that were part folktale and part religion. Tragedies and comedies emerged around 600 BC.

At the beginning of Greek literature stand the works of Homer; the Iliad and the Odyssey. Though dates of composition vary, these works were fixed around 800 BC or after. Another significant figure was the poet Hesiod. His two surviving works are Works and Days and Theogony.

=== Classical (c. 500 – 323 BC) ===
During the classical period, many of the genres of western literature became more prominent. Lyrical poetry, odes, pastorals, elegies, epigrams; dramatic presentations of comedy and tragedy; histories, rhetorical treatises, philosophical dialectics, and philosophical treatises all arose in this period.

The two major lyrical poets were Sappho and Pindar. Of the hundreds of tragedies written and performed during this time period, only a limited number of plays survived. These plays are authored by Aeschylus, Sophocles, and Euripides.

The comedy arose from a ritual in honor of Dionysus. These plays were full of obscenity, abuse, and insult. The surviving plays by Aristophanes are a treasure trove of comic presentation.

Two influential historians of this age are Herodotus and Thucydides. A third historian, Xenophon, wrote "Hellenica," which is considered an extension of Thucydides's work.

The greatest prose achievement of the 4th century BC was in philosophy. Greek philosophy flourished during the classical period. Of the philosophers, Socrates, Plato, and Aristotle are the most famous.

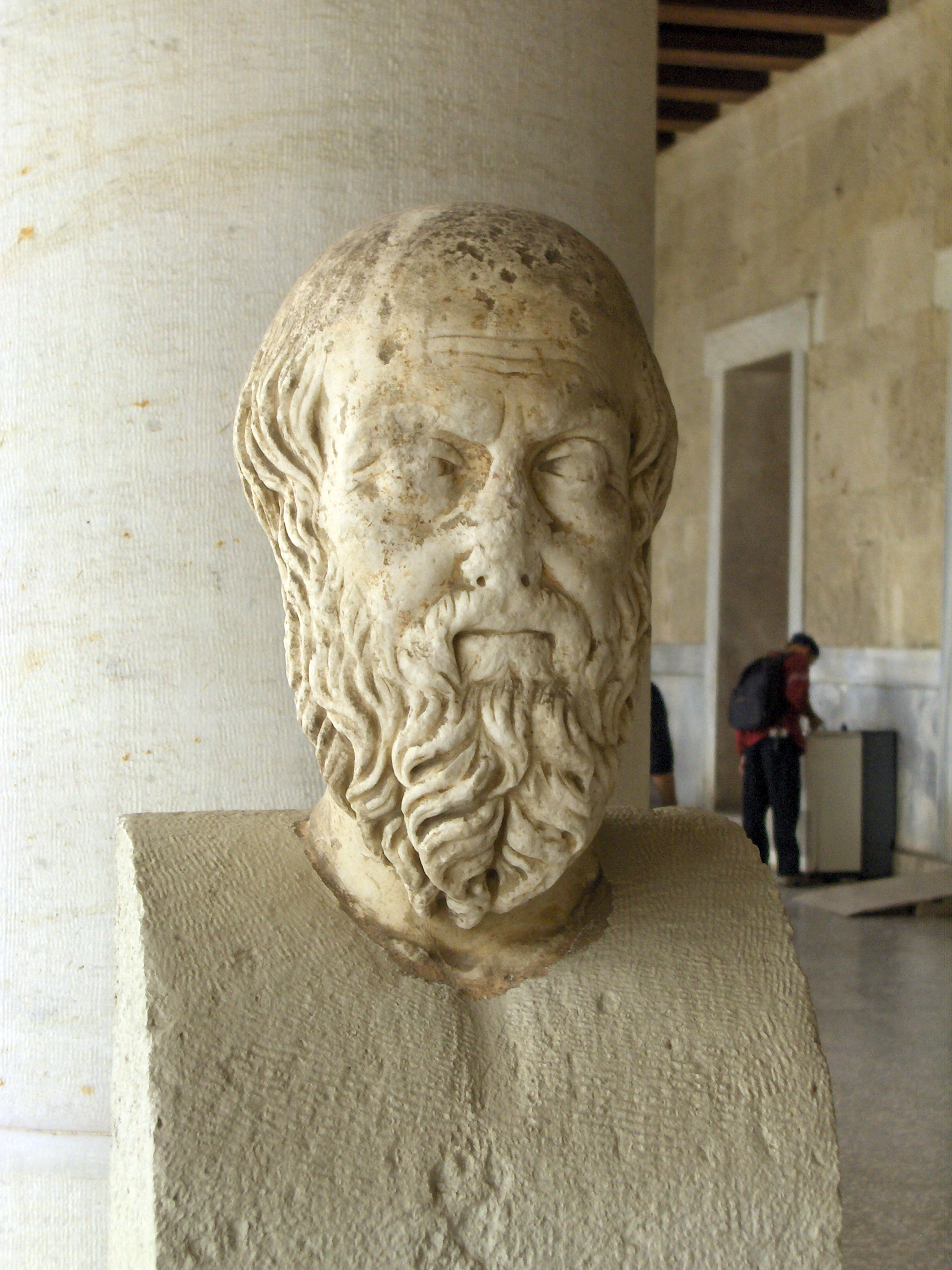
Herodotus

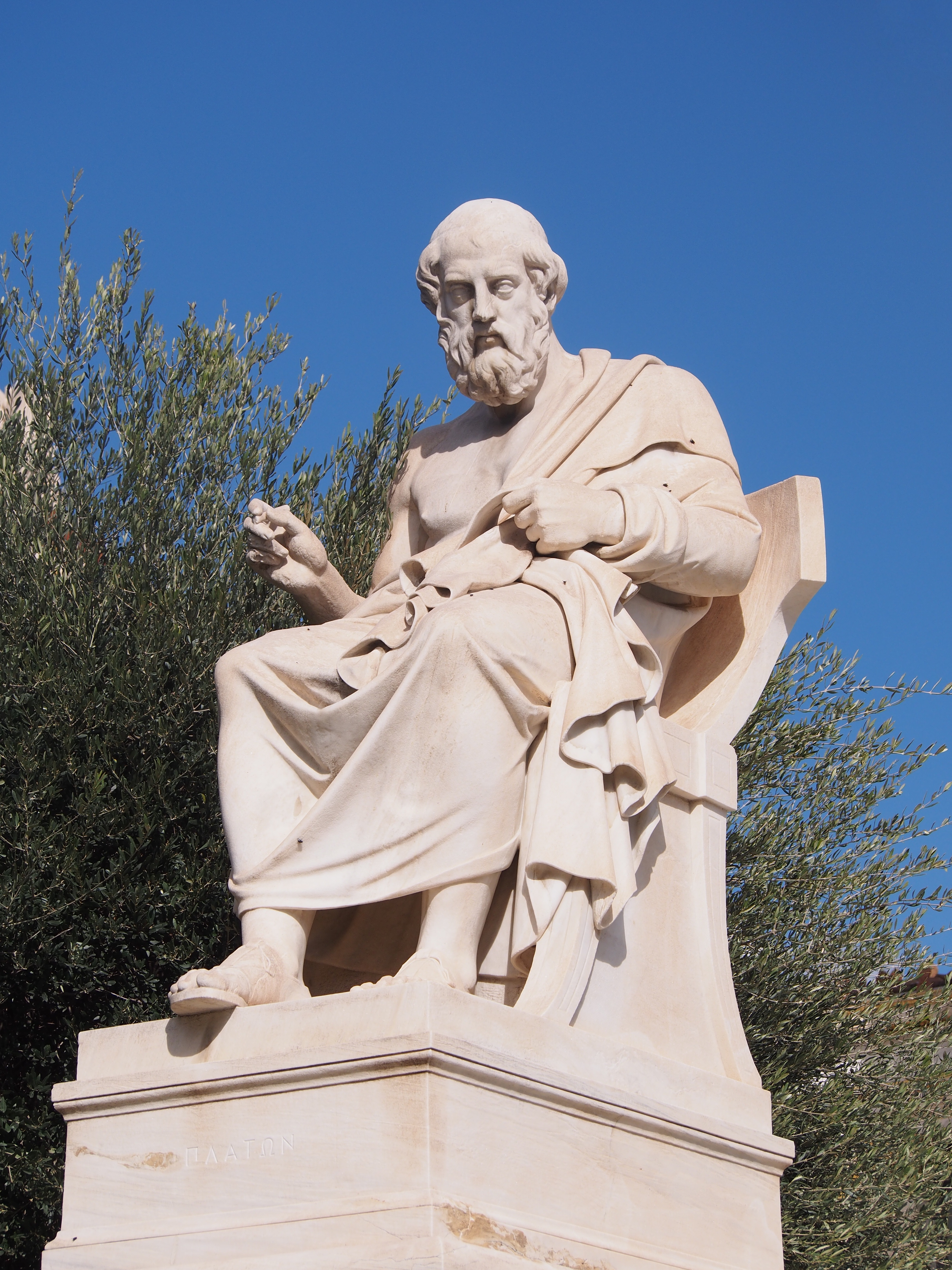
Plato

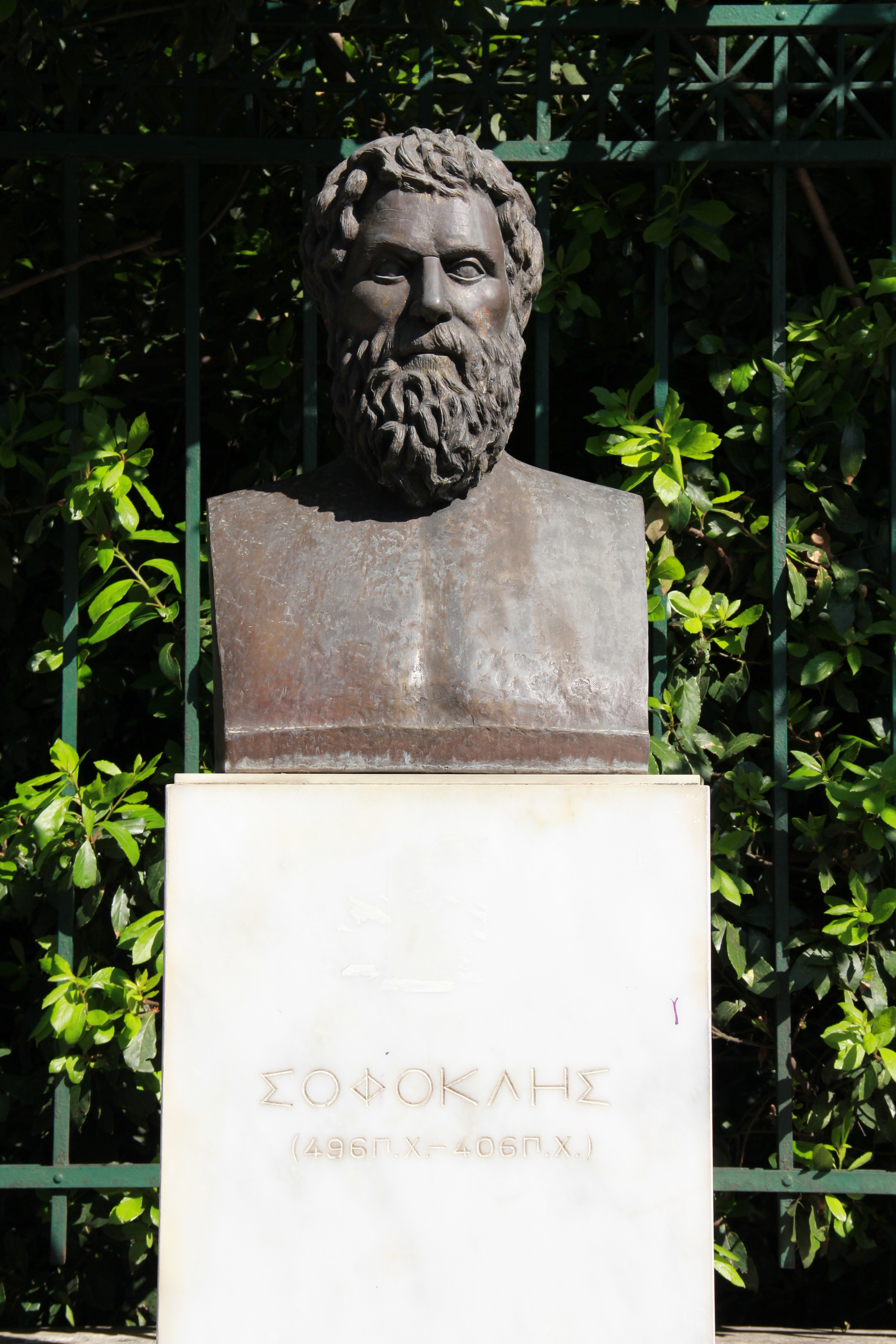
Sophocles

=== Hellenistic (323–31 BC) ===
By 338 BC many of the key Greek cities had been conquered by Philip II of Macedon. Philip II's son Alexander extended his father's conquests greatly.

The Hellenistic age is defined as the time between the death of Alexander the Great and the rise of Roman domination. After the 3rd century BC, the Greek colony of Alexandria in northern Egypt became the center of Greek culture.

Greek poetry flourished with significant contributions from Theocritus, Callimachus, and Apollonius of Rhodes. Theocritus, who lived from about 310 to 250 BC, was the creator of pastoral poetry, a type that the Roman Virgil mastered in his Eclogues.

Drama was represented by the New Comedy, of which Menander was the principal exponent.

One of the most valuable contributions of the Hellenistic period was the Septuagint translation of the Old Testament into Greek. This work was done at Alexandria and completed by the end of the 2nd century BC.

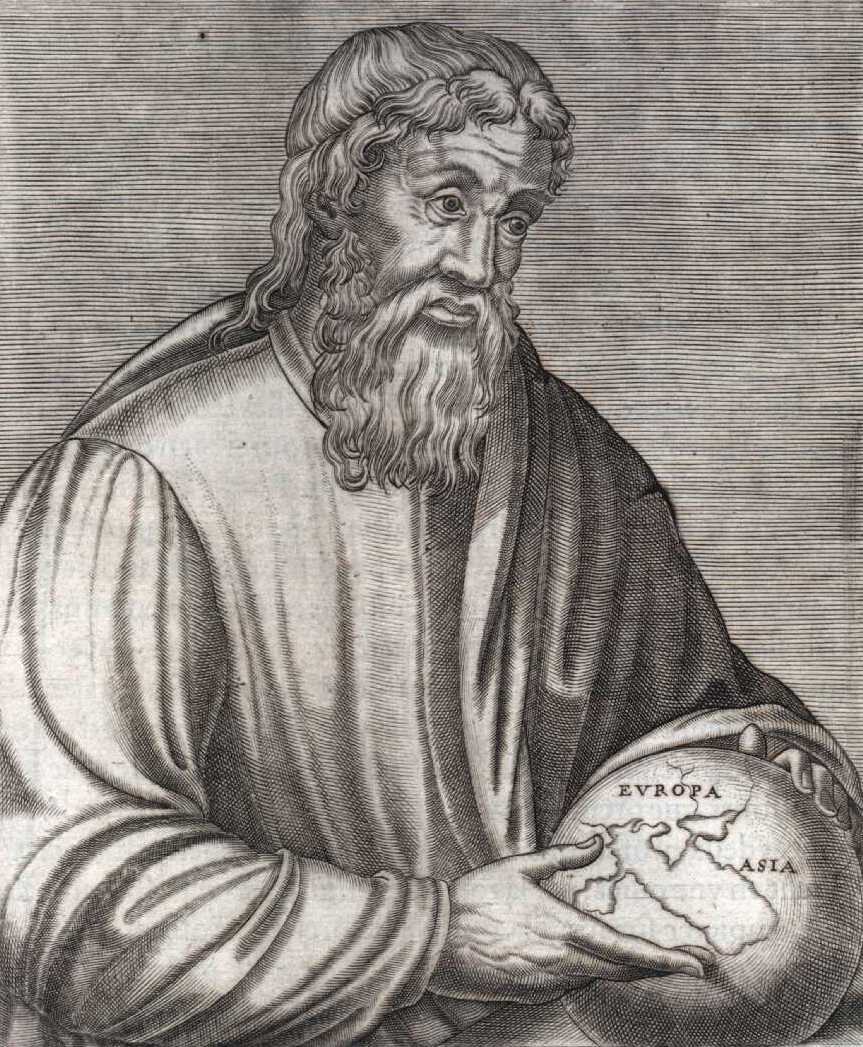
Strabo

=== Roman Age (31 BC – AD 284) ===
Literature in Greek in the Roman period contributed significant works to the subjects of poetry, comedy, history, and tragedy. A large proportion of literature from this time period were histories.

Significant historians of the period were Timaeus, Polybius, Diodorus Siculus, Dionysius of Halicarnassus, Appian of Alexandria, Arrian, and Plutarch. The period of time they cover extends from late in the 4th century BC to the 2nd century AD.

Eratosthenes of Alexandria wrote on astronomy and geography, but his work is known mainly from later summaries. The physician Galen pioneered developments in various scientific disciplines including anatomy, physiology, pathology, pharmacology, and neurology. This is also the period in which most of the Ancient Greek novels were written.

The New Testament, written by various authors in varying qualities of Koine Greek, hails from this period. The Gospels and the Epistles of Saint Paul were written in this time period as well.

== Byzantine literature (c. 330 – 1453) ==
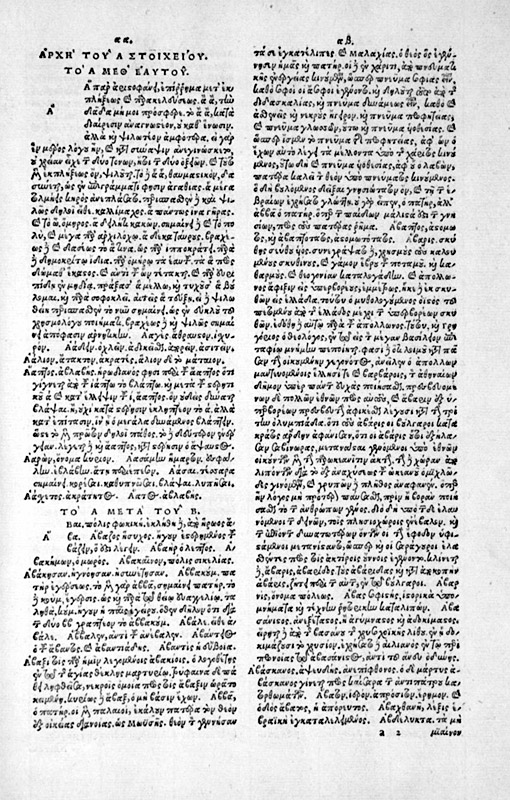
A page from a 16th-century edition of the 10th century Byzantine encyclopaedia of the ancient Mediterranean world, the Suda

Byzantine literature refers to literature of the Byzantine Empire written in Atticizing, Medieval and early Modern Greek.

Byzantine literature combined Greek and Christian civilization on the common foundation of the Roman political system. This type of literature was set in the intellectual and ethnographic atmosphere of the Near East. Byzantine literature possesses four primary cultural elements: Greek, Christian, Roman, and Oriental.

Aside from personal correspondence, the literature of this period was primarily written in the Atticizing style. Some early literature of this period was written in Latin; some of the works from the Latin Empire were written in French.

Chronicles, distinct from historic, arose in this period. Encyclopedias also flourished in this period.

Digenes Akritas (Διγενῆς Ἀκρίτας) is the most famous of the Acritic songs and is often regarded as the only surviving epic poem from the Byzantine Empire. It is considered by some to signal the beginnings of modern Greek literature.

== Modern Greek literature (1453–present) ==
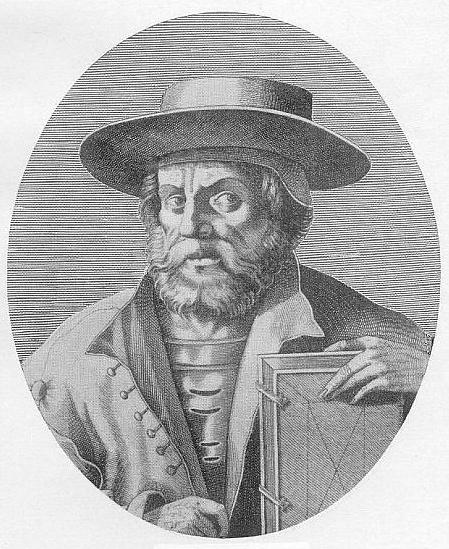
Manuel Chrysoloras, scholar in the Renaissance

Modern Greek literature is written in common Modern Greek. During this period, the modern vernacular form of the Greek language became more commonplace in writing.

This period saw the revival of Greek and Roman studies and the development of Renaissance humanism and science.

The Cretan Renaissance poem Erotokritos is a prominent work of this time period. It is a verse romance written around 1600 by Vitsentzos Kornaros (1553–1613).

Modern Greek literature is significantly influenced by the Diafotismos, a movement that translated the ideas of the European Enlightenment into the Greek world. Adamantios Korais and Rigas Feraios are two prominent figures of this movement.

Today, Modern Greek Literature participates in the global literary community. The Greek authors Giorgos Seferis and Odysseas Elytis have been awarded the Nobel Prize in Literature.

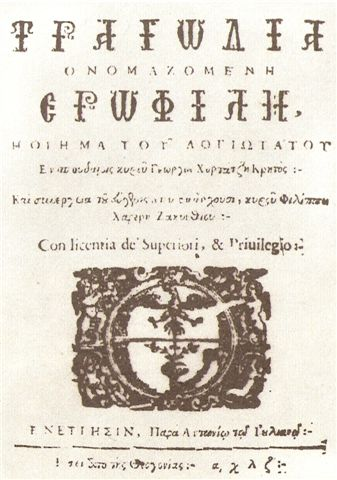
Cover of Erofili by Georgios Chortatzis

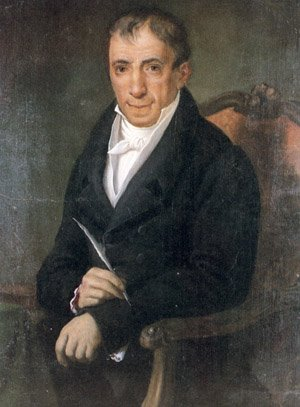
Adamantios Korais, major figure of the Modern Greek Enlightenment

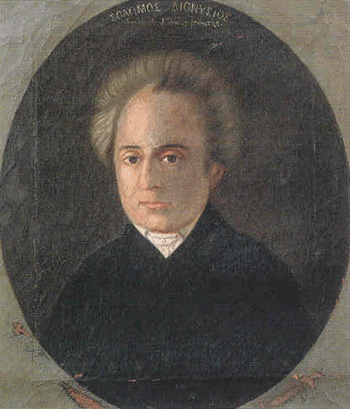
Dionysios Solomos, member of the Heptanese School (literature) and writer of the Hymn to Liberty

== See also ==
- Ancient literature
- Latin literature
- Greek scholars in the Renaissance
- Modern Greek Enlightenment
- Modern Greek theatre
- Loeb Classical Library
- Greek Anthology
- List of libraries in Greece

== Sources ==
- Encyclopædia Britannica Article on Greek Literature
- Warwick University Bibliography of Greek Literature

=== Preclassical ===
- Overview of Preclassical Greek Literature

=== Classical ===
- Princeton and Stanford Working Papers in Classics
- Ancient World Open Bibliography on Classical Literature
- Williams College Bibliography for the Classics

=== Hellenistic ===
- Bryn Mawr Guide to Hellenistic Literature
- Oxford Bibliographies for Hellenistic Literature
- Ancient-Greec.org overview of Hellenistic Literature
- History Channel Vault of Hellenistic Greece
- Hellenistic Historiography by Syracuse University

=== Greco-Roman ===
- University of Chicago Greco-Roman Literature Overview
- Shawnee Heights Greco-Roman Literature Overview

=== Byzantine ===
- University of Notre Dame, History of Byzantine Literature
- King's College London History of Byzantine Literature

=== Modern ===
- Modern Greek Studies Association
- Hellenism.net, Modern Greek Literature Overview
- Greece In Print
