= Sunpendulum =

Global media art project by Kurt Hofstetter

Sunpendulum is a global media art project by Austrian artist Kurt Hofstetter. It consists of a network of video cameras, called "Time-Eyes", installed in twelve time zone around the world and directed at the sky. The installation network was developed between 1999 and 2006.

== Concept ==
The Sunpendulum concept uses twelve Internet-connected video cameras in different time zones to transmit simultaneous views of the sky. The cameras face the eastern sky, with their images sent over the Internet. The proposed display system called for the feeds to be shown together on twelve monitors, allowing daylight and darkness in different parts of the world to be viewed simultaneously and forming what Hofstetter described as a global "sun clock".

The installation phase began in 1999 with cameras on Maui, Bermuda and in Granada. Cameras followed in Cairo, New Orleans and Ensenada in 2000, the Azores in 2001, Dubai in 2002 and Hong Kong in 2003. Contemporary reporting described the Hong Kong installation as the ninth Time-Eye in the network.

In 2004, the tenth Time-Eye was installed at Jadavpur University in Kolkata. The Statesman described the installation as a collaboration between the university's Film Studies and Electronics and Telecommunications departments and the project, and reported that the network was intended to connect twelve locations around the world. The final two Time-Eyes were installed in Tokyo in 2005 and the Marshall Islands in 2006.

== Time-Eye installations ==
The twelve Time-Eyes and their host institutions were:

- 1999 – Maui, Hawaii: Maui High Performance Computing Center
- 1999 – Bermuda: Bermuda Underwater Exploration Institute
- 1999 – Granada: University of Granada
- 2000 – Cairo: Ain Shams University
- 2000 – New Orleans: University of New Orleans
- 2000 – Ensenada: Autonomous University of Baja California
- 2001 – Azores: University of the Azores, Angra do Heroísmo
- 2002 – Dubai: Zayed University
- 2003 – Hong Kong: Hong Kong University of Science and Technology
- 2004 – Kolkata: Jadavpur University
- 2005 – Tokyo: Kanazawa Institute of Technology
- 2006 – Majuro, Marshall Islands: College of the Marshall Islands

The 2004 Kolkata installation was placed at Jadavpur University's Salt Lake campus. Contemporary Marshall Islands coverage recorded the Majuro installation as the final Time-Eye and likewise listed the network's installations from 1999 through 2006.

== Collaboration ==
The project was developed through collaborations with universities and research institutions in the participating time zones. The Statesman characterized Sunpendulum as a collaboration between art and science and noted the role of participating universities and research centres in providing technical infrastructure. The Institute of Computer Graphics and Algorithms at the Vienna University of Technology also participated in the project; contemporary reporting from the Marshall Islands credited it with cooperation in the installation of the Time-Eyes.
