= Modern Greek theatre =

Theatre in post-medieval Greece

Modern Greek theatre refers to the theatrical production and theatrical plays written in the Modern Greek language, from the post-Byzantine times until today.

== Venetian Crete ==
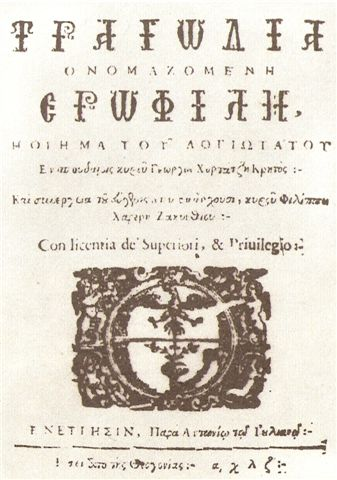
Cover of Erofili

The renaissance which led to the modern Greek theatre took place in the Venetian Crete. Significal dramatists include Georgios Chortatzis, Vitsentzos Kornaros, and other Cretan writers. Erotokritos is undoubtedly the masterpiece of this early period of modern Greek literature, and represents one of its supreme achievements. It is a verse romance written around 1600 by Vitsentzos Kornaros (1553–1613). The other major representative of the Cretan literature and theatre was Georgios Chortatzis and his most notable work was Erofili, which was characterized by Kostis Palamas as the first work of modern Greek theatre. Other notable plays include The Sacrifice of Abraham by Kornaros, Panoria and Katsourbos by Chortatzis, Fortounatos by Markos Antonios Foskolos, King Rodolinos by Andreas Troilos, Stathis (comedy) and Voskopoula by unknown artists. During this period, there was production of different theatrical genres, such as tragedies, comedies, pastoral and religious plays.

== Heptanesean theatre ==
After the occupation of Crete by the Ottoman Empire, in late 17th century, the intellectual center of the Greeks, such as the theatrical, was transferred in the Ionian Islands. The Heptanesean theatre was heavily influenced by the Italian Renaissance.

Notable playwrights include Petros Katsaitis, Savoyas Rousmelis and Dimitrios Gouzelis. One of the most notable works was Vasilikos (1830) by Antonios Matesis.

== Greek Enlightenment and Independence ==
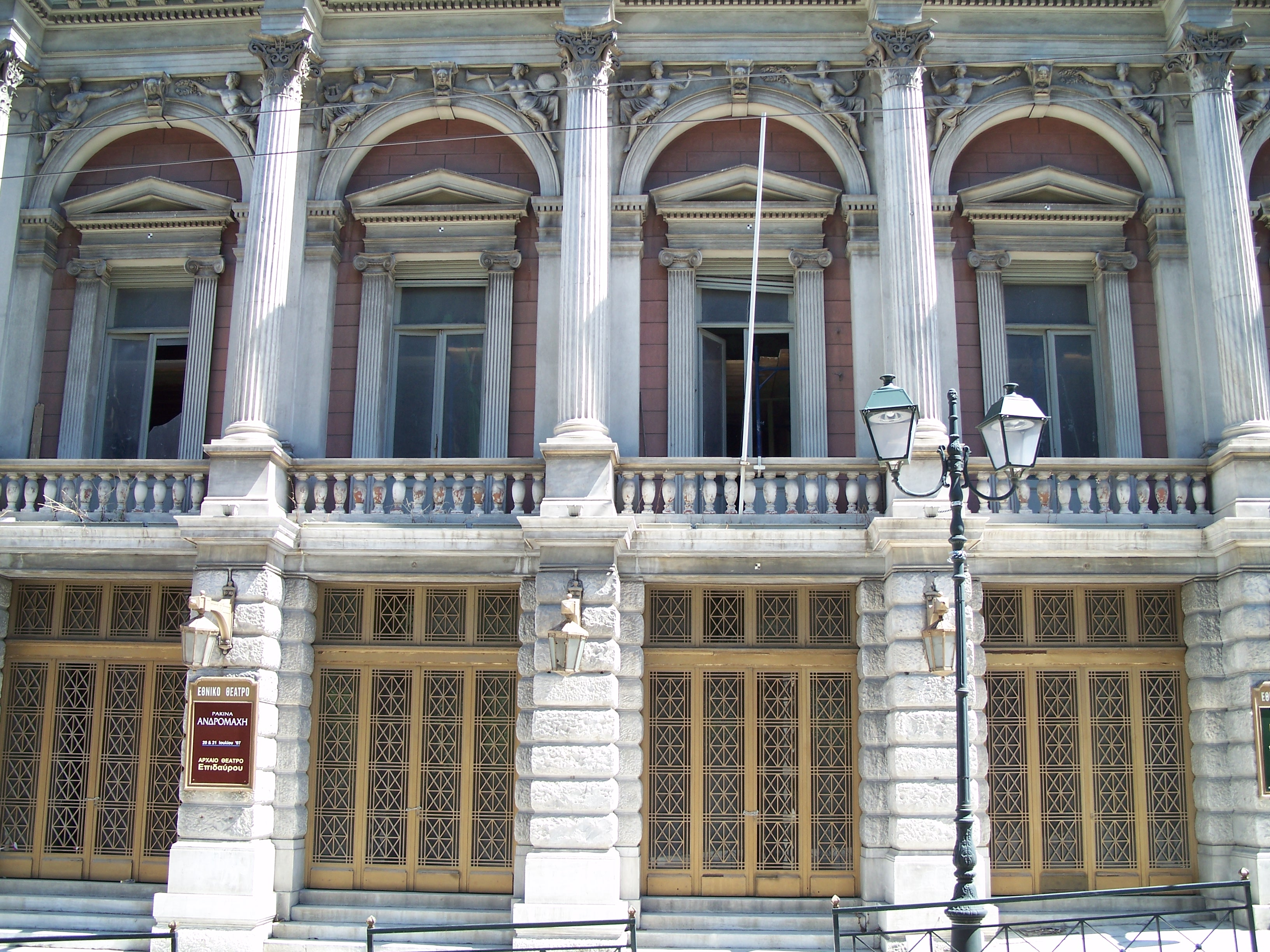
National Theatre of Greece

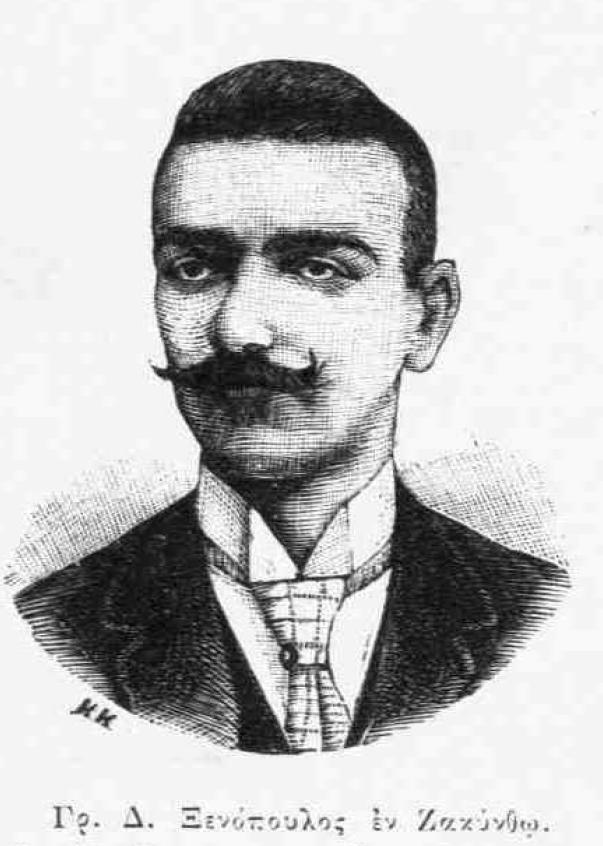
Gregorios Xenopoulos

During the pre-revolution years, notable theatrical works include the Achilleus or Death of Patroclus (1805) by Athanasios Christopoulos, Timoleon (1818) by Ioannis Zambelios, while Korakistika (1812) by Iakovakis Rizos Neroulos was a lampoon against the Greek intellectual Adamantios Korais and his linguistic views (Katharevousa).

After independence, the theatrical scene of the new Greek Kingdom was dominated by writers who were closer to the First Athenian School (or Phanariotic), such as Alexandros Rizos Rangavis, Alexandros Soutsos and Panagiotis Soutsos. These writers mainly used a conservative and archaic form of the Greek language, katharevousa. A notable exception is the comedy Babylonia (1836), by Dimitris Vyzantios, a satire of the different Greek dialects in simple language. Until the end of the 19th century, the romantic tragedy dominated dominate, such as the Maria Doxapatri (1853) and Fausta (1893) by Dimitrios Vernardakis.

The Royal Theatre was founded in 1880 in Athens. New genres became popular in the 1880s. Revues, operettas and komidylio (κωμειδύλλιο) (musical comedy), with works like I tychi tis Maroulas (1889), O agapitikos tis voskopoulas (1891) by Dimitrios Koromilas and Golfo (1893) by Spyros Peresiadis (later transferred in cinema).

With the appearance of the New Athenian School (or Palamian), in the late 19th century, and the central figure of Kostis Palamas, the use of Demotic Greek became more acceptable. However, in 1903, a translation by the Royal Theatre of Aeschylus' Oresteia into the spoken Greek language (not Katharevousa) provoked protests by conservative students.

Playwrights and dramatists of the new era included Gregorios Xenopoulos (probably the most important figure), Angelos Sikelianos, Nikos Kazantzakis, Pantelis Horn, Yórgos Theotokás, Giannis Skarimpas, Vasilis Rotas, Angelos Terzakis and others. Notable actors Aimilios Veakis, Marika Kotopouli and Cybele Andrianou.

The Royal Theatre was re-founded in 1932 as National Theatre. The first plays staged were the Aeschylus' Agamemnon and Gregorios Xenopoulos' comedy O theios Oneiros. The first actor team included Katina Paxinou, Aimilios Veakis, Eleni Papadaki and Alexis Minotis. First theatrical director was placed Fotos Politis and from 1934 Dimitris Rontiris.

== After WWII ==
After the war, new playwrights appeared, like Dimitris Psathas, Nikos Tsiforos. Their work in many cases was transferred in the cinema. For example, most of the plays of Sakellarios/Giannakopoulos (around 140), were transferred also in the cinema.

Significant theatrical actors appeared also in the movies of the Greek cinema (which had its "Golden Age"), like Dimitris Horn, Manos Katrakis, Orestis Makris, Melina Mercouri and more.

Iakovos Kambanellis was probably the most significant post-war Greek playwright, while Karolos Koun was also a notable director, widely known for his lively staging of ancient Greek plays.

== See also ==
- Athens Festival
