= Ariadne (given name) =

Female given name

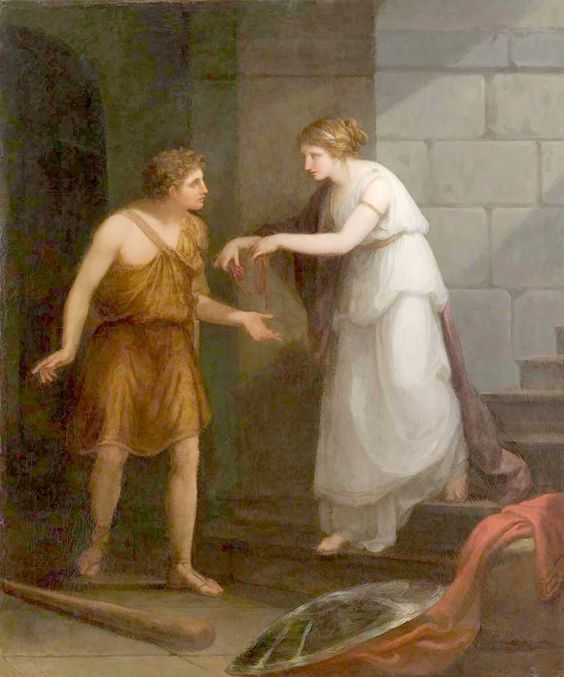
- Ariadne gives a ball of thread to Theseus by Angelica Kauffman.
- Gender: Feminine
- Language: Cretan Greek

Origin
- Meaning: “Most holy”

Other names
- Related names: Ariadna, Ariana, Ariane, Arianna, Arianne

Ariadne is a feminine given name of Greek origin. It is derived from the Cretan Greek words ari, a prefix meaning most, and adnos, meaning holy. It is often given in reference to the story of Ariadne from Greek mythology.

== Women ==
- Ariadne (empress), a Byzantine Empress from the late 5th century
- Ariadne of Phrygia, Christian saint
- Ariadne Díaz (born 1986), Mexican actress and former model
- Ariadne Getty (born 1962), American philanthropist
- Ariadne Hernández, Mexican paralympic track and field athlete
- Arianna Huffington (born Ariadnē-Anna Stasinopoúlou in 1950), Greek American author, syndicated columnist and businesswoman
- Ariadne von Schirach (born 1978), German philosopher, writer, journalist and critic
- Ariadne Spanaki (born 2001), Greek sailor and Olympian

== Pen name ==
- Ariadne (writer), the pseudonym of the anonymous British female playwright who wrote the 1696 comedic play She Ventures and He Wins

=== Fictional characters ===
- Ariadne Oliver, a character in the novels of Agatha Christie
- Ariadne the spider, a character in the British children's animated TV series Creepy Crawlies
- Ariadne, a character in the film Inception
- Ariadne, a character in the Korean manhwa Ares
- Ariadne, a character from British TV series Atlantis
