= Andrea Cornaro =

Andrea Cornaro may refer to:

- Andrea Cornaro, Marquis of Bodonitsa (died 1323), Venetian nobleman
- Andrea Cornaro (historian) (1547–1616), a Venetian poet and historian
- Andrea Cornaro (cardinal) (1511–1551), Italian Roman Catholic bishop and cardinal
- Andrea Cornaro (architect), 17th-century Venetian architect; see Gates of Belgrade
