= Theatre of Greece =

Theatre of Greece may refer to:

- Theatre of ancient Greece
- Modern Greek theatre
- National Theatre of Greece, Athens, founded in 1880
