= Neikrug =

Neikrug is a surname. Notable people with the surname include:

- Arianna Neikrug (born 1993), American jazz singer, songwriter, and arranger
- Marc Neikrug (born 1946), American composer, pianist, and conductor
