= College of the Marshall Islands =

Community college in Uliga, Marshall Islands

- Type: Public community college
- Established: 1993
- Accreditation: ACCJC
- Location: Uliga, Majuro Atoll, Marshall Islands
- Website: www.cmi.edu

The College of the Marshall Islands (CMI) is a public community college in Uliga on the Majuro Atoll of the Marshall Islands. It primarily serves students from within the Micronesian region and is designated as the national post-secondary institution for the Republic of the Marshall Islands (RMI), as enacted in RMI PL 1992-13, The College of the Marshall Islands Act. The college is accredited by the Accrediting Commission for Community and Junior Colleges (ACCJC).

== Campus ==
The main campus of the College of the Marshall Islands is located in Uliga, Majuro Atoll. The College Administration Offices and the Library are located in the buildings formerly used as a hospital, as are some classrooms. The two-story Classroom Building, completed in 1991, has a 1996 four-classroom addition. The building also contains the Business Computer Lab, the College Achievement Project Learning Lab, and the Student Center, for study and quiet relaxation. Adjacent buildings house Land Grant Cooperative Research and Extension programs and PEACESAT administration, Upward Bound and College Achievement Project (SSSP).

Academic year 1999-2000 was a period of major campus growth and development. The two-story Science Complex, completed in mid-2000, added three large new classrooms, a small Science Computer Lab, and science research rooms that include an Agricultural Grow Room. The Administration Annex, just beyond the men's and women's dormitories, includes the Maintenance Office and facilities, Personnel and the Personnel Conference Room.

Oscar deBrum Hall, redeveloped and given that name in late 1999, houses the Continuing Education program on the first floor and faculty offices on the second. The College grounds were also much increased during this period by the replacement of a large service-road area with grassy areas and pathways that center on the college flagpole.

== Notable alumni ==
- Ariana Tibon-Kilma, Marshallese nuclear justice activist
