= Ariadna Cîrligeanu =

Romanian politician (born 2001)

Member of the Chamber of Deputies
- Incumbent
- Assumed office 21 December 2024
- Constituency: Botoșani County

Personal details
- Born: 8 May 2001 (age 25) Botoșani, Romania
- Party: Alliance for the Union of Romanians

Ariadna-Elena Cîrligeanu (born 8 May 2001) is a Romanian politician who since 2024 has been a member of the Chamber of Deputies for the Alliance for the Union of Romanians (AUR) party. She is the youngest member of the Romanian parliament.

== Early life and education ==
Ariadna-Elena Cîrligeanu was born on 8 May 2001 in Botoșani, the capital of Botoșani County, in Romania. She is a graduate from the Faculty of Law at the private Nicolae Titulescu University in Bucharest.

== Political career ==
=== Early political activity ===
In 2020, Cîrligeanu was elected the leader of Action 2012, initially founded and led by George Simion. In 2021, she was elected leader of Tineret a AUR, the youth organisation of the Alliance for the Union of Romanians party, succeeding Călin-Constantin Balabașciuc. After a year, Cîrligeanu resigned her position in 2021 to "concentrate on political activity in Botoșani County".

Cîrligeanu gained Romanian public attention in May 2023, when she was arrested by police assussed of attempting to smuggle five bullets into the Romanian parliament building. To the newspaper Adevărul, she explained that the bullets had posed no danger, with Simion defending her, stating that the bullets had been keychains. At the time of the incident, Cîrligeanu was a member of the National Leadership Bureau of AUR, being one of the six highest-ranking women in the party as of March 2024.

=== Member of the Chamber of Deputies (2024–present) ===
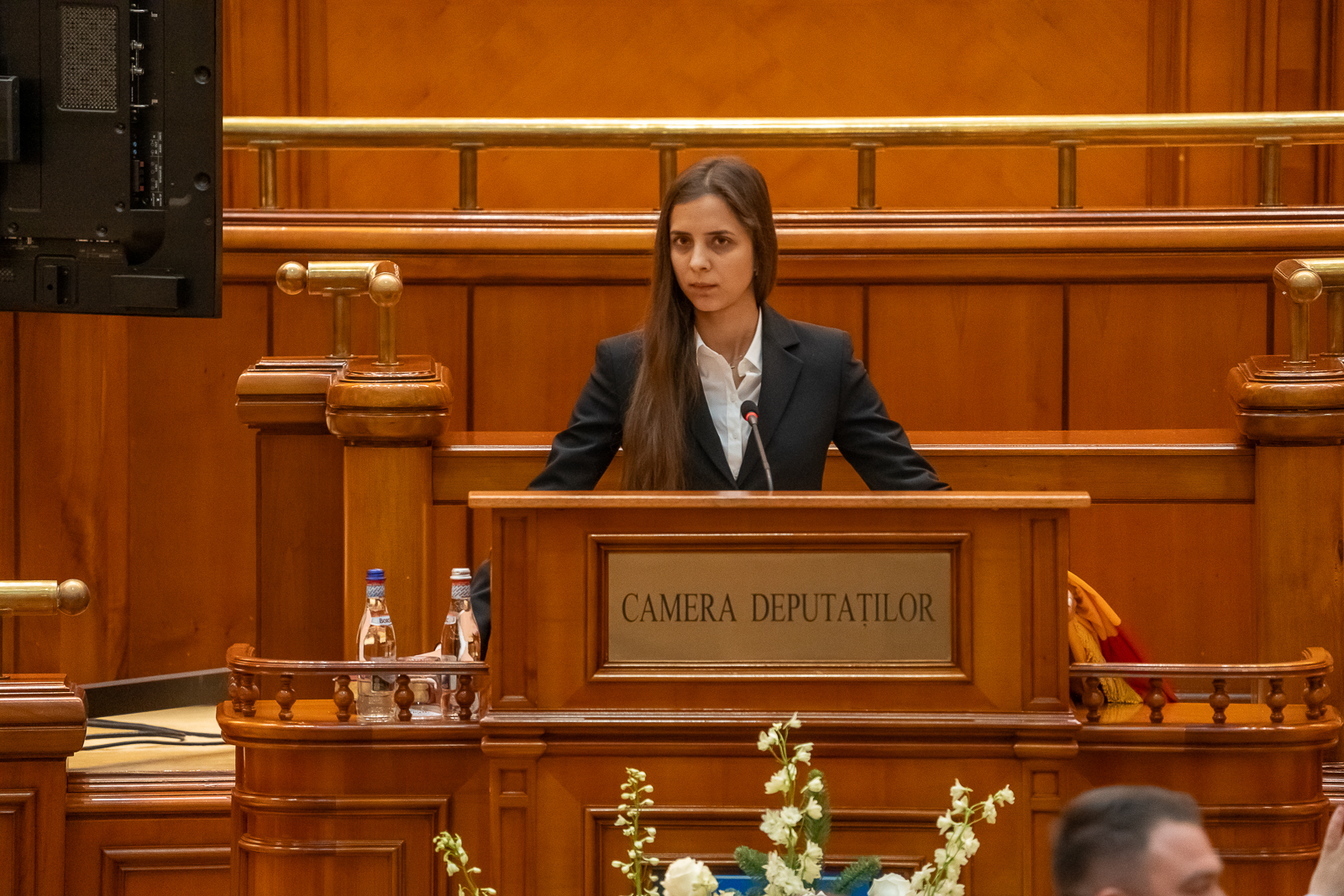
Cîrligeanu taking the oath of office on 21 December 2024

In the 2024 Romanian parliamentary election on 1 December, Cîrligeanu was elected a member of the Champer of Deputies for the AUR party in Botoșani County, taking office on 21 December as the youngest member of the 2024–2028 legislature. As a member of the Chamber of Deputies, she is a member of the Legal, Disciplinary and Immunities Committee, as well as, since March 2025, secretary of the Committee for Romanian Communities Abroad. Cîrligeanu is also part of the parliamentary friendship groups with Estonia, Lithuania, India, Denmark and Latvia.
