= Ariana Tibon-Kilma =

Marshallese nuclear justice activist and educator

Ariana Tibon-Kilma is a Marshallese nuclear justice activist and educator who advocates for compensation and care for nuclear test survivors in the Marshall Islands.

== Biography ==
Tibon-Kilma's mother is Marshallese politician Amenta Matthew and her maternal grandfather was Marshallese activist Nelson Anjain. Her family are survivors of the United States Nuclear testing at Bikini Atoll programme, which studied the impact of radiation on human bodies. She lives in Majuro.

Tibon-Kilma was educated at the College of the Marshall Islands (CMI) in Uliga, where she was a member of the Nuclear Club. She then studied Political Science at the University of Hawai’i at Manoa.

Tibon-Kilma works as a nuclear justice activist who advocates for compensation and care for nuclear test survivors in the Marshall Islands. In 2017, Tibon-Kilma was appointed as chair of the Marshall Islands National Nuclear Commission (NNC) by Nitijeļā (the legislature of the Marshall Islands). She became President of the NNC in 2023. In this role, Tibon-Kilma has spoken at the United Nations Human Rights Council, at the 15th Triennial Conference of Pacific Women and at the Nuclear Connections Across Oceania conference at the University of Otago in Dunedin, New Zealand.

Tibon-Kilma has also worked with the Marshall Islands public school system to develop a curriculum about the country's nuclear legacy and co-taught a Nuclear Issues in the Pacific course at her former college, the College of the Marshall Islands.
