= Iamb =

Iamb, iambus, or iambic may refer to:

== Meter and poetry ==
=== Classical poetry and quantitative verse ===
- Iamb (poetry)
- Choliamb
- Iambus (genre), or iambic poetry

=== Accentual-syllabic and syllabic verse ===
- Iambic trimeter
- Iambic tetrameter
- Iambic pentameter
- Iambic hexameter, or the alexandrine
- Iambic heptameter, or the fourteener

== Other uses ==
- Iamb (band)
- Iambic key/keyer
- Iambic Productions
- Dionysius Iambus, grammarian

== See also ==
- Iambe
