= Andrea Cornaro (historian) =

Venetian aristocrat, historian and author

- Ανδρέας Κορνάρος
- Born: Sitia, Crete; 1547
- Died: c. 1616 (aged 69)
- Burial place: Monastery of St. Francis, Candia
- Other name: Andrea Corner
- Spouses: Carnarola Zen; Anezina Zen
- Parents: Giaccomo Cornaro (father); Issaveta (Zampia) Demezo (mother)
- Relatives: Vicenzo Cornaro (brother)

Andrea Cornaro (1547 – c. 1616) or Andreas Kornaros (Greek: Ανδρέας Κορνάρος) was a Venetian aristocrat, historian and author.

== Personal life ==
Cornaro was a Venetian aristocrat born in Trapezonta Sitia on the island of Crete. He was the son of Giaccomo Cornaro and Issaveta (Zampia) Demezo and the brother of Vincenzo Cornaro. He was married twice, first to Carnarola Zen until her death, and then to Anezina Zen.

== Career ==
He served as a commander in a galley naval ship and at the age of 24, he participated in the battle of Lepanto with his galley Cristo.

His fiefdom included the villages of Voni, Zofori and Thrapsano in today's prefecture of Heraklion.

In 1591 he founded the Philological Academy of the Weird (L' Accademia degli Stravaganti) in Candia (now Heraklion). He wrote hundreds of poems in Italian. He also wrote History of Crete (Historia Candiana). These works were saved but never printed.

He died in 1616, at the age of 69. His burial took place in the monastery of Saint Francisco in Candia.
