= Călin-Constantin Balabașciuc =

Romanian politician (born 1996)

Member of the Chamber of Deputies
- Incumbent
- Assumed office 21 December 2020
- Constituency: Călărași

Personal details
- Born: 1 June 1996 (age 29)
- Party: Alliance for the Union of Romanians

Călin-Constantin Balabașciuc (born 1 June 1996) is a Romanian politician of the Alliance for the Union of Romanians. Since 2020, he has been a member of the Chamber of Deputies. He served as leader of the party's youth wing until 2021, and took office as the youngest member of parliament.
