= Mary Stanton =

American novelist

- Born: 1947 (age 78–79); Winter Park, Florida, U.S.
- Education: St. Olaf College; University of Minnesota
- Occupation: Author
- Writing career
- Pen name: Claudia Bishop
- Notable work: Unicorns of Balinor series

Mary Stanton (born 1947 in Winter Park, Florida) is an American author known for her eight-volume children's fantasy series Unicorns of Balinor. Writing under the pseudonym Claudia Bishop, she is also the author of 14 mystery novels in the Hemlock Falls series published by Berkley Prime Crime, three novels in the Casebooks of Dr. Mckenzie mystery series, and the senior editor of three mystery story anthologies: Death Dines At Eight-Thirty, Death Dines In, and A Merry Band of Murderers.

== Biography ==
Stanton is the eldest daughter of William Bishop Whitaker and Carole Whitaker who were both college professors for parts of their career. Her father at the time of her birth was the Dean of Men at Rollins College. When William Whitaker was recruited back into the Navy in the early 1950s he and his family were posted to Japan. Leaving active Naval service for the Reserves and a position in the State Department, Whitaker was posted to Hawaii where he occupied a position as Director of Educational Services for Southeast Asia.

May Stanton grew up in Hawaii and graduated from Kailua High School and left the island for undergraduate school in the late 1960s. She attended St. Olaf College in Northfield, Minnesota and she received a B.A. philosophy and literature from the University of Minnesota. She also attended a year of law school and a year of graduate school majoring in rehabilitation therapies. She worked a number of jobs in Minnesota including a year as a nightclub singer, a medical examiner for Social Security, a claims adjuster and a Director of Volunteer Services at Hostings State Hospital.

In 1967, she married Robert Tom Nelson but the marriage ended in 1973 as a divorce with no children. In the mid-1970s, Mary Stanton left Minnesota for Rochester, New York to work for Aetna Life & Casualty Insurance Companies. In 1974, she married Robert J. Stanton of Walworth, New York but the marriage ended in another divorce in 1999. From the marriage there were three stepchildren; John Robert Stanton, Harry Cole Stanton, and Julie Stanton Schwartz.

=== Career ===
She began her career as a copywriter in the early 1980s working for several companies, including Xerox Corporation, until she opened her own marketing communications company in 1985, specializing in research and writing of Malcolm Baldrige National Quality Award applications. She had clients including Xerox, Westinghouse, American Express, and Eastman Kodak. She accepted a junior partner Daniel J. Hucko in 1985, sold the business in 1992 to Young and Rubicam, and left the business in 1994 to write full-time.

Stanton's first book was animal fantasy The Heavenly Horse from the Outermost West (1984); it was published in the United States, the United Kingdom and Japan. The sequel was Piper at the Gate (1989). She sold her first mystery novel to Berkley Books in 1994 and since then has written at least 16 mystery novels as Claudia Bishop and 11 children's books including the series Unicorns of Balinor.

She wrote non-fiction articles on horse care and veterinary medicine which appeared in national and regional magazines. She wrote three scripts for the TV cartoon Princess Gwenevere and the Jewel Riders, including the aired episode "Song of the Rainbow."

== List of books ==
=== As Mary Stanton ===
==== Heavenly Horse series ====
1. The Heavenly Horse from the Outermost West (1988)
2. Piper at the Gate (1989, published as Piper at the Gates of Dawn in UK)

==== A Magical Mystery series ====
1. My Aunt, the Monster (1997)
2. Next Door Witch (1997)
3. White Magic (1997)

==== Unicorns of Balinor series ====
1. The Road to Balinor (1999)
2. Sunchaser's Quest (1999)
3. Valley of Fear (1999)
4. By Fire, by Moonlight (1999)
5. Search for the Star (1999)
6. Secrets of the Scepter (2000)
7. Night of the Shifter's Moon (2000)
8. Shadows over Balinor (2000)

- Unicorns of Balinor (omnibus) (2006)

==== Beaufort and Company ====
1. Defending Angels (2008)
2. Angel's Advocate(2009)
3. Avenging Angels(2009)
4. Angel's Verdict(2011)
5. Angel Condemned(2011)

==== Anthologies in collaboration ====
- Fantasy Tales for Girls (2006) (with Jane B. Mason and Sarah Hines Stephens)

=== As Claudia Bishop ===
==== Hemlock Falls Mysteries series ====
1. A Taste For Murder (1994)
2. A Dash of Death (1995)
3. A Pinch of Poison (1995)
4. Murder Well-Done (1996)
5. Death Dines Out (1997)
6. A Touch of the Grape (1998)
7. A Steak in Murder (1999)
8. Marinade for Murder (2000)
9. Just Desserts (2002)
10. Fried By Jury (2003)
11. A Puree of Poison (2003)
12. Buried By Breakfast (2004)
13. A Dinner to Die For (2006)
14. Ground to a Halt (2007)
15. A Carol for A Corpse (2007)
16. Toast Mortem (2010)
17. Dread on Arrival (2012)
18. A Fete Worse Than Death (2013)

==== The Casebooks of Dr. Austin McKenzie series ====
1. The Case of the Roasted Onion (2006)
2. The Case of the Tough-Talking Turkey (2007)
3. The Case of the Ill-Gotten Goat (2008)

==== Anthologies in collaboration ====
- Aliens: Tales to Warp Your Mind (1994)
- Death Dines at 8:30 (2001) (with Nick DiChario)
- Death Dines In (2004) (with Dean James)
- A Merry Band of Murderers (2006) (with Don Bruns)
