= Iamb (band) =

Iamb is a band from the Central Coast of California. While it began as a solo recording project by frontman Ross Major, Iamb now performs with various members as a band. The music can be described as a combination of indie, post-rock, or folk music.

The music video for Iamb's first single, "I Don't Care What Happens," has been featured on MTV and MTVu.

Iamb has released a full-length album and a 7" record on independent label Real Love Records

== Band members ==
- Ross Major - Vocals, Guitar, Mandolin, Keyboard
- George Major - Cello, Violin

=== Other contributors ===
- Andy Pyle - Live Guitar, Keyboard, Banjo
- Paul Frankel - Drums and Percussion
- Kevin Coons - Guitar
- Kelly Bold - Vocals

== Discography ==
- I'll Stay Waiting (2006)
- "Pacific Nature Recording Presents... 1" (Split CD with Kingsauce and Flatsound) (2007)
- Come Back Home (Split 7" with Candle) (2007)
- "Farewell" (Re-released under his name, Ross Major, digitally) (2008)
