= Erotokritos =

1625 poem by Vitsentzos Kornaros

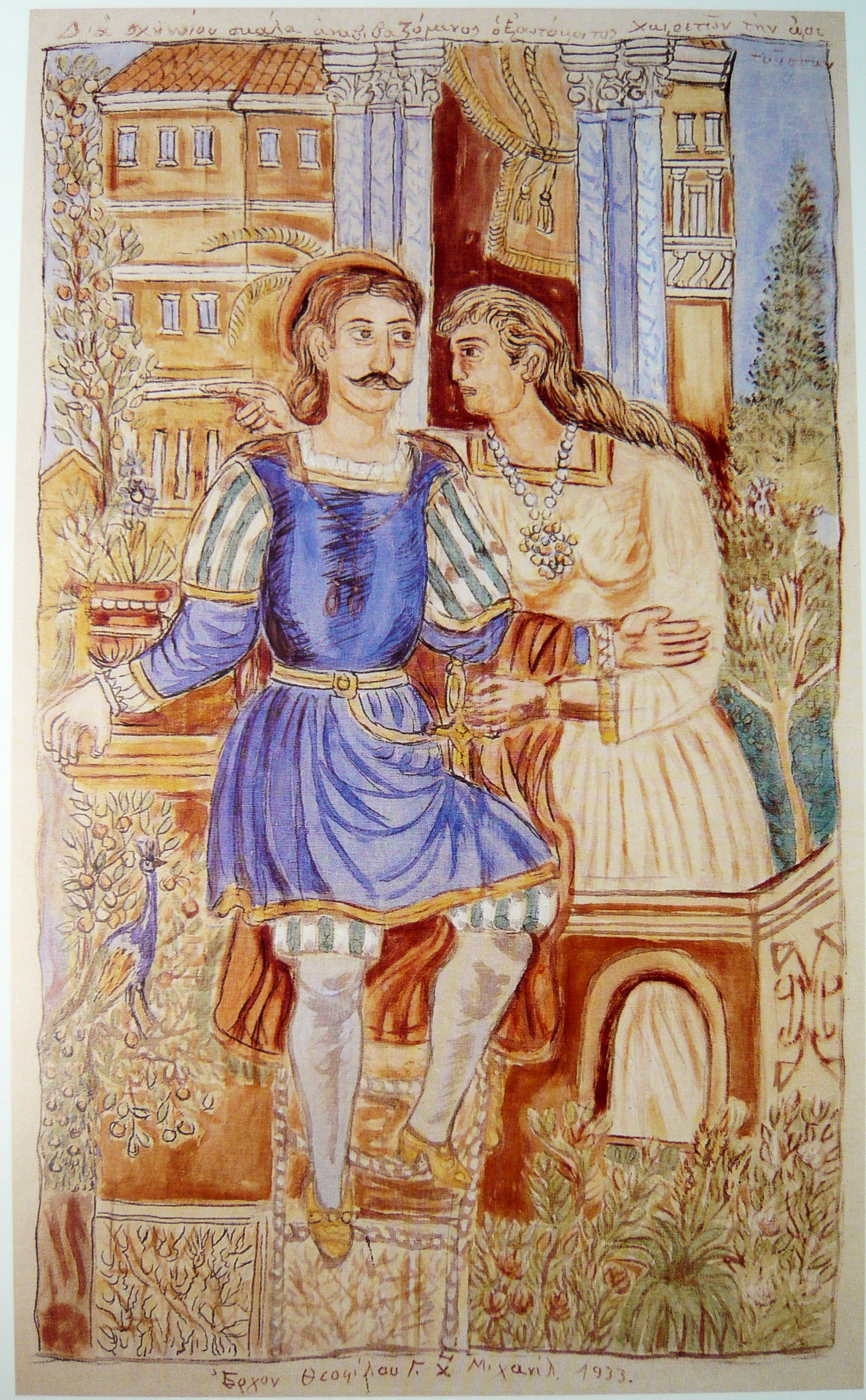
- Erotokritos and Aretousa. Painting by Theofilos Hatzimichail (1933).
- Author: Vikentios Kornaros
- Original title: Ερωτόκριτος
- Language: Greek
- Genre: Romance
- Publication place: Venetian Crete

Erotokritos (Greek: Ἐρωτόκριτος) is a romance composed by Vikentios Kornaros in early 17th century Crete. It consists of 10,012 fifteen-syllable rhymed verses, the last twelve of which refer to the poet himself. It is written in the Cretan dialect of the Greek language. Its central theme is love between Erotokritos (only referred to in the work as Rotokritos or Rokritos) and Aretousa. Around this theme, revolve other themes such as honour, friendship, bravery and courage. Erotokritos and Erophile by Georgios Hortatzis constitute classic examples of Greek Renaissance literature and are considered to be the most important works of Cretan literature. It remains a popular work to this day. It is accompanies by music when it is publicly recited. A particular type of rhyming used in the traditional mantinades was also the one used in Erotokritos.

== Characters ==
The poet narrates the trials and tribulations suffered by two young lovers, Erotokritos and Aretousa, daughter of Heracles, King of Athens.

== Plot ==
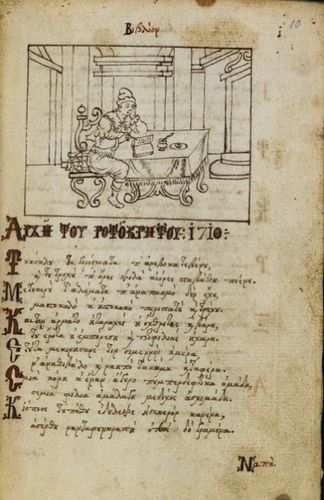
Manuscript of Erotokritos. From the Ionian Islands, c. 1710. Now at the British Library.

The romance takes place in ancient Athens, but the world displayed is a complex construct which does not correspond to any particular historical period. Alongside references to classical Greece there are anachronisms and many elements particular to Western Europe, such as the jousting competition. The work is divided in the following five parts:

I. After several years of marriage, a daughter (Aretousa) is born to the King of Athens (Heracles) and his wife. The son of the faithful adviser to the king (Erotokritos) falls in love with the princess. Because he cannot reveal his love, he sings under her window in the evenings. The girl gradually falls in love with the unknown singer. Heracles, when he learns about the singer, organizes an ambush to arrest him, but Erotokritos with his beloved friend kills the soldiers of the king. Erotokritos, realising that his love cannot have a happy ending travels to Chalkida to forget. During his absence, his father falls ill and when Aretousa visits him, she finds in the room of Erotokritos a painting of hers and the lyrics he sang. When he returns, he discovers the absence of his drawing and songs and learns that the only person that visited them was Aretousa. Realizing that his identity was revealed and that he may be at risk, he stays at home pretending to be ill. Aretousa sends him a basket of apples to wish him well and as an indication she shares his feelings.

II. The king organizes a jousting competition for the entertainment of his daughter. Many noblemen from around the known world participate and Erotokritos is the winner.

III. The couple begins to secretly meet under the window of Aretousa. The girl pleads with Erotokritos to ask her father to allow them to marry. Naturally, the king is angry with the audacity of the young man and has him exiled. Simultaneously a marriage proposal for Aretousa arrives by the king of Byzantium. The girl immediately gets engaged secretly to Erotokritos before he leaves the city.

IV. Aretousa refuses to consider any marriage proposals and is imprisoned by the king alongside her faithful nanny. After three years, when the Vlachs besiege Athens, Erotokritos reappears, his true identity concealed through magic. In a battle he saves the life of the king and gets wounded in the process.

V. In order to thank the wounded stranger the king offers him his daughter as spouse. Aretousa refuses to accept this marriage and in discussion with the disguised Erotokritos she persists in her refusal. Erotokritos submits her to tests to confirm her faith and finally reveals himself after breaking the spell that concealed his identity. The king accepts the marriage and reconciles with Erotokritos and his father, and Erotokritos ascends to the throne of Athens.

== Key characteristics ==
Although with regard to the evolution of the plot, Erotokritos follows all the characteristics of a knightly novel, Kornaros presents some particularities with regard to the structure, with characteristics derived from other literary species. Apart from the epic elements, the presence of dramatic features is also intense: the division into five parts reflects the pentameric division of classical drama, while the theatrical character imparts the frequent presence of the dialogue. The manuscript of the work does not show the pentameric division, which appears only in printed publications, but it is considered by the scholars to be organic and related to the conception of the work by the poet

The epic-heroic and erotic element referred to as thematic cores already in the first verses ("and even the riots, the conceited and the weights / of Eros the baptism and kissing the grace"), coexist in the work divided symmetrically, with erotic superior to the first, the third and the fifth, while the heroic in the second and the fourth, while being interrelated, with one feeding the other: Erotokritos' love for Aretousa is motivated for his participation in the storm, while the man and a bid to the country's king is the fact that allows the success of the relationship.

The emphasis on food and erotic imagery is also seen clearly in the work. The importance of the issue of social discrimination also plays a very important role: the love of the two heroes is in contradiction with established social conventions and puts them in conflict with their environment, but at the end of the project, "personal virtues" prevail.

Kornaros' significant innovation is the emergence of the hero's psychological state and the convincing justification of the motivations of their behavior.

== Use of language ==
The language of Erotokritos is the Cretan dialect, mostly according to the idiom of Sitia. Typical dialectical forms used in the text are:

- the use of the articles τση and τσι (tsi) instead of της and τις (tis);
- the use of the questioning pronoun ίντα or είντα (ínta) in the place of continental τι (ti "what");
- the use of the plain articles τον, την, το (ton, tin, to) in the place of relative pronouns (τον οποίον, την οποίαν, το οποίο ton opíon, tin opían, to opío): "Δεν είχαν την αποκοτιά στα θέλου να μιλήσου";
- the muting of the final -ν (-n) in the genitive plural of nouns and the third person plural of verbs (των αρμάτω ton armáto "of the weapons", να μιλήσου na milísou "that they talk");
- the placement of the pronoun after the verb as in εχάσαν τα (echásan ta "they have lost them");
- use of αυτόνος and αυτείνος (aftónos, aftínos) instead of continental/standard εκείνος (ekínos "that one").

In particular, the poem's language is based on the Eastern Cretan idiom and displays its typical characteristics, such as the use of the pronoun τως (tos) instead of τους (tous; "τα πάθη τως", "their sufferings"), the use of the past-tense augment ἠ- (í- as in ήκαμε, ήβανε íkame, ívane), the elimination of the -ι- after -σ- ("να τσ' αξώση"), as well as the passive aorist -θηκα, -θηκες, -θηκε (in place of -θη, -θης, -θη(ν), for example, εχάθηκε instead of εχάθη).

Further phonetic features of the Erotokritos are: a) assimilation or elision of the sonorants μ, ν (m, n) within a word when followed by λ, ρ (l, r) or a continuous fricative (θ, φ, χ th, ph, ch): e.g., την χέρα → τη χέρα "the hand", έλαμψα → έλαψα "I shone", μέμφεται → μέφεται "he reproaches", ανθυβολή → αθιβολή "remembrance"; b) partial transformation of the definite article η and οι (both i) into the semivowel [j] when followed by the vowels α, ε, ο, ω (a, e, o) in connected speech: e.g., η άλλη → η jάλλη "the other (fem.)", οι ανθρώποι → οι jαθρώποι "the people"; c) elision of the transitional vowel -ι- (-i-) in contraction when preceded by a continuous alveolar sibilant consonant, i.e., in the clusters σι, ξι, ψι, ζι: e.g., ανιψιός → ανιψός "nephew", άξιος → άξος "worthy", αξίζω → ξάζω "to scrape").

The language of Erotokritos is based on the spoken Cretan dialect (mainly the idiom of Sitia), but it also differs from it, if compared to comedies or various documents, since it has few words derived from Italian, while on the contrary it often has more lexical features.

The verses are also taken care of: Vowel hiatuses are avoided and the rhyme at the end of the verse is never abandoned. The verses and the language of the epic differ in some features from the Greek folk song: The position of the accents shifts occasionally within the verse, so that a stressed syllable can even directly follow another one, although in the usual iambus every second syllable is emphasized. Furthermore enjambements and punctuation within the same verse are frequent, all elements that contribute to the rhythmic variety and the avoidance of monotony.

== Philological issues ==
There are numerous adaptations and reworks of this romance that there is speculation that other works may be earlier versions of Erotokritos, such as an earlier play known as Thysia. There are three literary issues surrounding Erotokritos. the most important, on which the others depend, is the issue of the poet's identity, as the name Vitsentzos Kornaros was widespread in Crete. The other two important problems are the issue of the dating of the work and the question of the speculated Italian model on which the poet was based. For the subject of the poet, it is accepted by most scholars to identify with Vitsentzos Kornaros of Jacob, brother of the Venetian author Andreas Kornaros. Vitsentzos, according to archival sources, was born in 1553 and died in 1613 or 1614. Based on this evidence, it is concluded that Erotokritos was written between 1590 and 1610. [10] On the Italian model on which Kornaros was based, the various adaptations of the French work stand out from the study of two, one of 1543, and one of Angelo Albani's diameters, entitled Innamoramento de due fidelissimi amanti Paris en Vienna, 1626. An examination of all Italian adaptations in relation to Erotokritus has led to the conclusion that the earlier version was the one used by Kornaros, a point accepted by several philologists. This view agrees with the poet's proposed identification

== Sources ==
The direct model of the work is the French popular medieval romance Paris et Vienne composed by Pierre de la Cépède, which was printed in 1487 and was widely circulated, having been translated to many European languages. Kornaros most likely became familiar with the French original through the Italian translation, since he was unlikely to understand French. He adapted the original creatively and his adaptation displays some merits compared to both the original and other adaptations. The plot is better structured, the characters fewer, some repetitions are reduced and there is more emphasis on the development of the psychology of the heroes. The first part of the work follows the original. The two works differ significantly after the failed marriage proposal. In Paris et Vienne two lovers eloped and attempted to make an escape, but after a while the girl is captured by people of her father and Paris travels in the East. The heroic act that contributes to the pair's reunion in the original is the release of the king from captivity, after he was arrested in an abortive crusade. The end of both romances is similar with the strange benefactor offering to marry the princess and her accepting only after his true identity is revealed. Apart from the French romance, the influence of Orlando Furioso by Ludovico Ariosto is evident, particularly in the epic elements of the work. The work was also influenced by the Greek literary tradition and specifically demotic songs and proverbs as well as other texts such as Erofili, Apokopos and Penthos Thanatou.

== Manuscript and printed edition ==
The work was very popular and circulated in manuscript form throughout the 17th century. In 1713 it was printed in Venice by some Cretan who had collected several manuscripts of the work, and relied on them to deliver a sufficiently valid and reliable version. There are no extant manuscripts of the work except for an unfinished one of 1710. It is decorated with elegant miniatures, but is less valid than the Venetian version in its delivery of the text, because it alters the character of the vernacular language at places. Probably the copying process stopped after the release of the printed version in 1713. Several reprints of the original edition followed, and the first modern edition appeared in 1915 by Stefanos Xanthoudides.

== Legacy ==
Erotokritos sets great store by true love, friendship, courage, and patriotism, and this is the reason for its later popularity all over Greece. It was a source of inspiration for Dionysios Solomos and influenced Greek poets as diverse as Kostis Palamas, Kostas Krystallis, and George Seferis. A complete translation to English was made by Theodore Stephanides in verse, and by Betts, Gauntlett and Spilias in prose. Several groups of renowned Cretan musicians have added selected parts of the poem to their music, often exploring the boundaries of their local musical tradition.

== Resources ==
Ερωτόκριτος: του δίσκου τα γυρίσματα [Erotokritos: as the disk spins] – CD-ROM

An updated version of the contents of this CD-ROM has been made available online (2023) – Erotokritos: as the disk spins. This contains the complete text, each word linked to a concordance, together with a vocabulary list, a reverse index, a rhyme index, and a table of lemmata and word-forms.

== See also ==
- Cretan literature
- Erofili
- Mantinada
- Sophia Antoniadis
