= Ariane Laroux =

Franco-Swiss artist (born 1957)

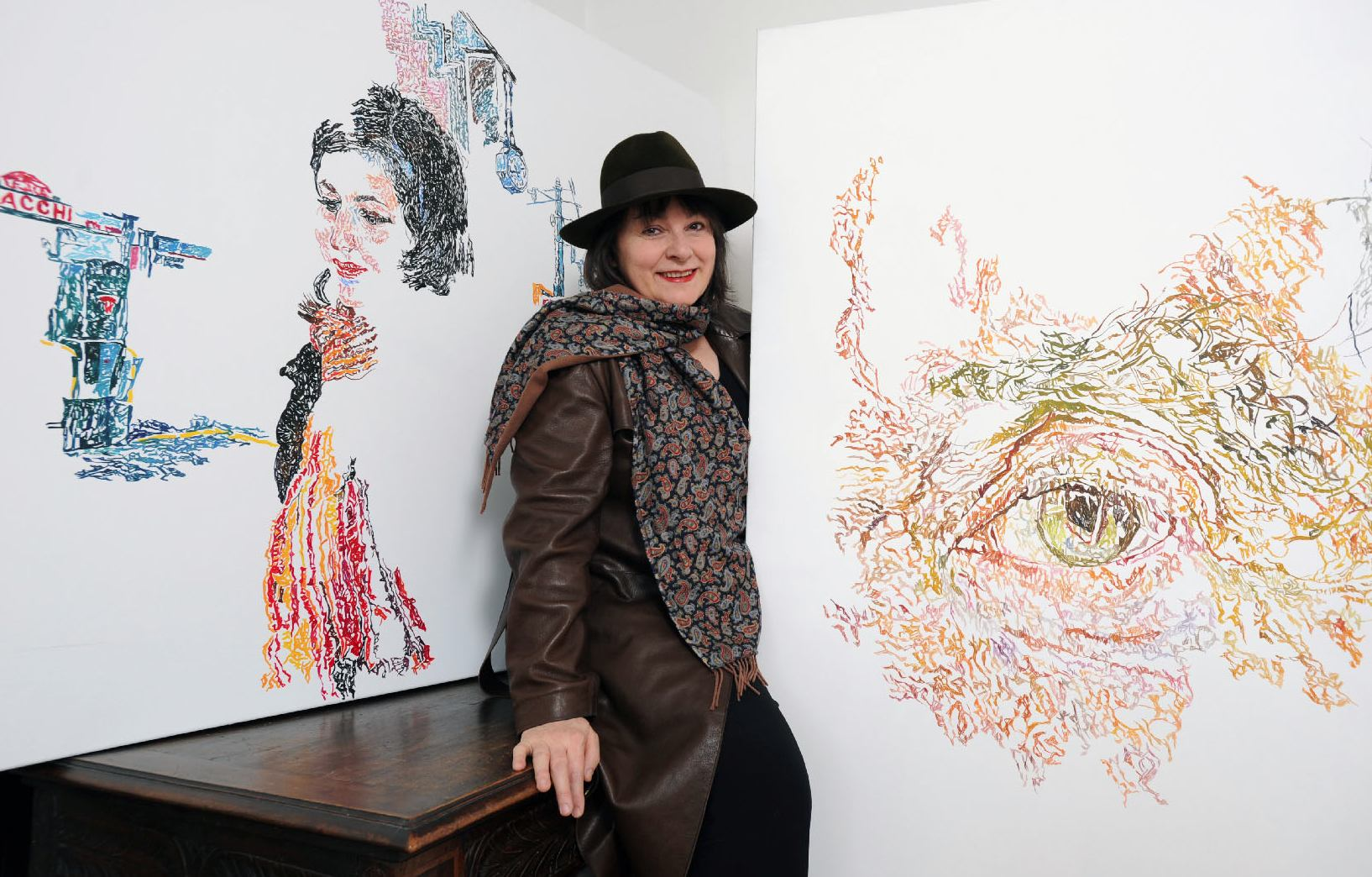
Ariane Laroux in her art studio

Ariane Laroux (born 12 April 1957) is a Franco-Swiss painter, draughtsman and printmaker. She is known for her black and white drawings, using void and empty spaces in her artworks. She has drawn portraits of renowned activists, while interviewing them, paying attention to having exactly the same number of women and men portraits in her books. She has exhibited several examples in the British Museum.

== Biography ==
Laroux was born in Paris, France, and spent her childhood with her parents in Montmartre in the studio of the Red House of Artists, Rue Ordener, and with her grandparents at Square de la Tour Maubourg near Les Invalides.

After studying at the College of Verneuil-sur-Seine, she gained a degree in history at the Sorbonne and at the Ecole des Beaux Arts in Geneva. In 1984 she married the artist-engraver Daniel Divorne (1934–2003), director of the Geneva Centre for Contemporary Engraving.

== Bibliography ==
- Laroux, Ariane; Armleder, John M (2017). Daniel Divorne: la gravure contemporaine (in French). Lausanne: L'Age d'homme. ISBN 9782825146545. OCLC 1013911709.
- Laroux, Ariane (2013). Paysages urbains: le trajet du regard : dessins, peintures et textes (in French). Lausanne; Paris: L'Âge d'homme. ISBN 9782825140468. OCLC 852240339.
- Laroux, Ariane (2008). Déjeuners chez Germaine Tillon (in French). Lausanne: L'Age d'homme. ISBN 9782825138762. OCLC 299688799.
- Laroux, Ariane (2006). Portraits parlés: j'ai rêvé de dessiner les gens qui changent le monde : soixante-huit rencontres d'hommes et de femmes qui ont pris des risques pour passer de l'ombre à la lumière (in French). Lausanne: Editions L'Age d'homme. ISBN 9782825137161. OCLC 927297197.

== Exhibitions ==
From 1979 to 2017, Laroux exhibited at, among others, the Alice Pauli Gallery in Lausanne, the Cantonal Museum of Fine Arts in Lausanne, Württembergischer Kunstverein Stuttgart, in Ditesheim, the gallery Eric Franck (Geneva-Berlin-Basel), the Michel Foëx Gallery (Geneva), Museum Country and Val de Charmey, the Museum of the Resistance in Lyon, the Roswitha Hartmann Gallery (Zurich), the Museum of European and Mediterranean Civilisations (Marseilles, 2006), the Musée de l'Homme (Paris, 2008), the British Museum (London 2016).

- 2017 : Exhibition in Drawing Library of British Museum : Lines of Thought, Drawing from Michelangelo to now.
- 2016 : Exhibition in Drawing Department of British Museum : 1 September-7 November 2016.
- 2016 : Lecture by Marie-Christine Barrault of Déjeuners chez Germaine Tillion at the Théâtre Magic Mirrors du Havre (2 June 2016), at the Théâtre du Grutli of Geneva (18 November 2016), aux éditions des Femmes, (17 May 2017).
- 2015 : Exhibition at Drawing Library of the British Museum. (September–October 2015).
- 2015 : Exhibition in Drawing Library of British Museum.
- 2010 : Forum Meyrin: Travels in the city, large format oil on canvas, black stone. With Metropolis Michael Wolf, Under the Moon II, work-p gallery Arts Red Zone, Geneva: The Empty and Full. 24 November-9 December. lay Miguel Navarro, curator of the exhibition Boris Tissot, Centre Pompidou.
- 2010: University of Britain. Lorient: Exhibition: « Commitment ». Oil on canvas and black stone. May 28 to September 7.
- 2008: Rumine Palace, Lausanne. Installation: Lighting, August 17 July-20.
- 2008: Museum of Contemporary Art of Brittany, Rennes: Drawings, paintings of Germaine Tillion. 24 January to 4 May 2008.
- 2008: The Man Museum, Palais de Chaillot, Paris: Drawings, paintings of Germaine Tillion. May 30 to September 8.
- 2007: Théâtre du Châtelet. Paris: Resistor Germaine Tillion. Drawings. Accompanies the representation of his operetta The Verfügbar to Hell, written in the Ravensbrück camp.
- 2005: Museum of Civilizations in Europe and the Mediterranean, Marseille: Drawings. 19 November to 3 April.
- 2004: History of Resistance and Deportation Centre, CHDR, Lyon: Resistors. Drawings. May 27 to November 14.
- 2002: MAMCO, Museum of Contemporary Art in Geneva at the Forum Meyrin: The city's lights.
- 2002: Charmey Museum: Labyrinthine spaces. Personal exhibition. Catalogue.
- 2001: NASA Planetary Biology Internship: Cat. : 1996-2000 Experience. University of Massachusetts.
- 2000: Charmey Museum: Bookplate 1900–1999, Catalogue, French to English.
- 2000: British Museum, London. Purchase of drawings and Drawing Special Event. Drawing Department. October.
- 1998: European Triennial of Engraving, Prague: The labyrinth. 7 to 15 October
- 1996: Roswitha Haftmann Gallery, Zurich: Urban Spaces, drawings. June 12-July 14.
- 1995: Gallery Ditesheim, Neuchâtel: Faces. With Giacometti, Hockney, Music ... 13 May to 15 July.
- 1995: Collection Nestlé International, peinture à l’huile
- 1994: Galerie Michel Foëx, Geneva: Solo exhibition: The painter works with white and black weapon. March 2–16 April
- 1993: Gallery Ditesheim, Neuchâtel: Solo exhibition: From the point of view of the subject. March 6–17 April.
- Geneva: A city collects. 1950–1990. 1991-1992: SSR TV and TV5, Communication, drawing on the newscast and Jean-Philippe Rapp, Director of North-South Forum.
- 1988-1990: Galerie Eric Franck, fairs Art 'Basel. 15–20.6.1988, 13–18.6.1990: Villes.
- 1988: Galerie Eric Franck, Geneva, Berlin: Solo exhibition: Follow the path of the eye. June 24 to July 30.
- 1985: Württembergisher Kunstverein, Stuttgart Das Selbsportrait. Catalogue April to June
- 1985: Museum of Fine Arts in Lausanne : Self-Portrait sat the time of photography. Pablo Picasso to Man Ray, Käthe Kollwitz, Edvard Munch, Alberto Giacometti, Gisèle Freund, Francis Bacon, Oskar Kokoschka, Joseph Beuys, Jean-Michel Basquiat, Frida Kahlo ... Commissioner Erika Billeter. Catalogue January to March.
- 1984: Galerie Alice Pauli, Lausanne: Shared with Abakanovich, 1–29 September.
- 1983: Galerie Alice Pauli, Lausanne, personal exhibition: the Empty and Full. November 8–24 December
- 1983: Francis Reusser Film, TV TSR.
- 1982: Catalog University of Geneva: only Cavaliers. No. 3.
- 1980: Today Gallery. Geneva, solo exhibition: Drawings. January 22 to February 12.
- 1980: Athénée Museum: Young artists. Geneva.
- 1977: Salon des Independants. Grand Palais, Paris.
