= Unicorns of Balinor =

Children's book series by Mary Stanton

- The Road to Balinor – 1988; Sunchaser's Quest – 1999; Valley of Fear – 1999; By Fire, By Moonlight –1999; Search for the Star – 2000; Secrets of the Scepter – 2000; Night of the Shifter's Moon – 2000; Shadows Over Balinor – 2000
- Author: Mary Stanton
- Illustrator: Pauline Baynes
- Country: United States of America
- Genre: Fantasy; Children's literature
- Publisher: Scholastic Inc.
- Published: 1988-2000
- Media type: Print (paperback)

Unicorns of Balinor is a series of novels by Mary Stanton for young readers. Originally published from 1988 to 2000, the stories follow the adventures of Princess Arianna of Balinor and her unicorn, Sunchaser as they restore the Royal Scepter and rally the kingdom to defeat an evil entity known as Entia the Shifter.

== Books ==
=== The Road to Balinor ===
Ari Langley is a thirteen-year-old girl recovering in the hospital and suffers from memory loss after a mysterious accident that has left her legs severely scarred. Her only prominent and familiar memory is a strong connection to a Chase, one of the horses at the Glacier River Farm where Ari lives with her foster parents, Ann and Frank. However, Ann and Frank realize they cannot afford Ari's medical bills and decide to lease Chase for riding lessons to the obnoxious and spoiled Lori Carmichael. Heartbroken to see her horse being treated badly, Ari runs away with Chase and her faithful collie, Lincoln. They do not get far before the group, along with Lori, fall through the mysterious Gap, a pathway between worlds.

=== Sunchaser's Quest ===
The group lands in Balinor, a magical land in which there are unicorns instead of horses and all animals can talk. However, this place is plagued by an evil and intangible entity known as the Shifter. Ari is revealed to be the missing Princess Arianna, heir to the throne of Balinor, and Chase is the unicorn known as The Sunchaser, Lord of the Animals. With help from Atalanta, a Celestial Valley Unicorn known as the Dreamspeaker, and Tobiano, a pinto unicorn, they must recover the Sunchaser's broken horn to restore his and Ari's telepathic bond.

=== Valley of Fear ===
Ari and Chase seek advice from the Old Mare of the Mountain, who tells them to reclaim the Royal Scepter. Though its powers are unknown to them, Ari, Chase, Linc and Lori journey through the Valley of Fear and across the Fiery Field to Entia the Shifter's castle. It's a nightmarish land where shadow unicorns reign and the travelers can take no food or water. However, they must risk it if there is any hope of defeating the forces of evil.

=== By Fire, By Moonlight ===
Ari and Chase fall back through the Gap and back to Glacier River Farm. This results in the balance of magic being altered and they must take on a trial of fire and ordeal by moonlight to set things right. With the scepter now in her possession, Ari begins to learn how to communicate with and use it. During their travels, the team gains a new ally in Finn, a kind-hearted teenage boy.

=== Search for the Star ===
A hibernating dragon named Naytin awakes, allowing Entia the Shifter to steal the dragon's magical jewel: the Indigo Star. With it, the Shifter gains control over the Celestial Valley's indigo herd. As the herd's colors and spirits are fading, and Naytin causes destruction to the land in search of the missing jewel, Ari and Chase quest to reclaim the Star.

=== Secrets of the Scepter ===
The balance of magic has been restored and the kingdom of Balinor is hopeful Entia can be defeated. Before she can lead her people into battle, Arianna must forge alliances with the Great Houses, diplomatically solve disputes, and accept the loss of an old friend. During her journey, she finds three golden rings that, when placed on the Royal Scepter, give her the authority to rule all of Balinor.

=== Night of the Shifter's Moon ===
Princess Arianna and Sunchaser are ready to fight Entia the Shifter. Ari returns to the Royal Palace and takes on the official role of Balinor's leader. The final battle between Balinor and Entia's forces are fierce and won't be won without help from the Celestial herd of unicorns.

=== Shadows Over Balinor ===
Entia the Shifter and his evil empire are destroyed. Balinor is a kingdom free of evil once more. Ari, however, has another quest to undertake: the search for the missing Royal family. Atalanta learns the King and Queen are being held in the Forgotten Fields, which can only be found with a map owned by the ancient archivist. Ari returns to the Valley of Fear and destroys a new evil called Kracken. The story's ending is left open, with Lori remaining in Balinor for the time being and Ari having not yet found her parents.

== Characters ==
- Arianna "Ari" Langley: Ari is a young girl who was left with amnesia from the Shifter casting a spell on her. The Dreamspeaker took Ari away into hiding with two human servants in the human world. She was in the hospital with two broken legs, and her only vivid memories were of her beloved horse named Chase; a unicorn whose horn was broken off on the day of the Great Betrayal. The two share a close bond. Her hair is the same color of Chase's mane and tail. She has sky blue eyes and is thirteen at the start of the series.
- Sunchaser: Known also as Chase to Ari and close friends, Sunchaser is Arianna's bonded unicorn. While in Balinor, he and Ari can communicate telepathically. He is also the Lord of the Animals. When they first returned to Balinor, Sunchaser was thought to be just a unicorn having lost his horn when it was shattered in a great battle. He is also kin to Atalanta herself and is brother to Rednal, leader of the Red Band. Chase is bronze-colored with deep mahogany eyes, has solid bronze hooves, and his mane and his tail are the same shade of Ari's hair. He is one of the largest unicorns, with a sharp ebony horn, and at the base of his horn is the ruby that holds his personal magic.
- Atalanta: A Celestial Unicorn known as the Dreamspeaker. Known also as the Lady of the Moon, Atalanta is a beautiful silver-and-violet unicorn who dwells in the Celestial Valley. Her mate is Numinor, the Golden One. When the Shifter first took over Balinor, Atalanta sent Chase and Arianna to Glacier River Farm to protect them from harm. Atalanta's nature is generally sweet, and she often visits Arianna in her dreams to warn her of danger, or to offer her advice.
- Moloch: Head of the Shadow herd, Moloch is a fierce shadow unicorn who is also the Shifter's right-hand servant. Able to change into a crow, Moloch has been used for many spy missions. At the end of book 8 Shadows Over Balinor, Moloch and Chase engage in a fight which resulted in Chase, unwillingly and at Ari's request, letting the large coal-black unicorn go. The whereabouts of Moloch are currently unknown after he runs away and goes into hiding.
- Lori Carmichael: An ordinary girl from our world, Lori comes from a wealthy family and is somewhat spoiled. When Chase was to be sold to Lori's family, Ari ran away with Chase and Lori followed her. Lori ends up in Balinor with Ari and becomes one of her closest friends, though she still remains rather overbearing.
- Finn: Originally from the desert country known as Deridia, Finn is a faithful and trust-worthy companion of the Princess. He helps Arianna and the Sunchaser win the Trial by Fire and eventually becomes the Captain of the Royal Cavalry. He initially rides Rednal, but when Rednal had to return to the Celestial Valley, Finn started to ride the Royal unicorn Beecher instead.
- Dr. Eliane Bohnes: Ari's faithful nurse, who accompanied Ari, Chase, and Anale (Ann) and Frank to the Glacier River Farm to protect Ari. Before she was a wizard in Balinor who served in the royal palace. When Ari and Chase return to Balinor, Dr. Bohnes follows her to ensure that Ari remains well.
- Lincoln: A collie who is loyal to Arianna and Sunchaser, he is often simply called "Linc." He turns out to be a frog-like creature named Gully who is the link between Balinor and earth, and is the only one capable of opening the doorway. In the end of Book 8, Atalanta rewards his loyalty to Arianna by gifting him the permanent form of a collie dog.
- Numinor: Leader of the herd of Celestial Unicorns, known as the Golden One. He is the mate of Atalanta.
- Rednal: A Celestial Unicorn, brother of Sunchaser. He is the leader of the Red Band of the Celestial Unicorns.
- Tobiano: A Celestial Unicorn, known also Toby. He tends to be very rude, especially to Lori. But even though he is rude he is loyal and true to the Celestial Valley herd and his friends.
- The Scepter: The Royal Scepter of Balinor, capable of speech and offers advice, though never provides any direct clear advice when Arianna requires it. The only way for anyone to ask it advice must be in question form. Its shaft has a lapis lazuli unicorn with sapphire eyes on top of it. In the Valley of Fear, Ari got it, alongside the Six.
- Lady Kylie: Originally a lady-in-waiting to the royal family of Balinor, Lady Kylie is revealed to be a follower of Entia and can take the form of a snake. She is said to be Lori's 'friend' in the Valley of Fear and Lord Lexan's sister in Sunchaser's Quest. She later serves as a spy, taking the guise of a servant to infiltrate the royal palace.
- The Shifter: Known as Entia, the most evil being in Balinor. His name, the Shifter, derives from his ability to shift into any form for a limited amount of time. When the moon is dark (as in Earth's new moon), it is called the Night of the Shifter's Moon, and nobody can use magic for positive means.
- The Old One: The Old Mare of the Mountain, a mysterious unicorn mare, the Beholder of the Deep Magic. She is mentor to Atalanta.
