= Arianna Sessi =

Italian cyclist

Personal information
- Born: 8 October 1999 (age 27)

Cycling career
- Sport: Cycling
- Discipline: Road
- Role: Rider

Amateur teams
- 2017: GS Città di Dalmine ASD
- 2018: Tre Colli–Chirio
- 2019: Born to Win

Professional team
- 2020: Eurotarget–Bianchi–Vittoria

Arianna Sessi (born 8 October 1999) is an Italian professional racing cyclist, who most recently rode for UCI Women's Continental Team Eurotarget–Bianchi–Vittoria. In August 2020, she rode in the 2020 Strade Bianche Women's race in Italy.
