= Ariana Jacob =

American artist

Ariana Jacob is an artist based in Portland, Oregon, in the United States. Her art work is conversation-based and invites people to reflect on their political identity.

== Biography ==
Jacob worked as an assistant to Mierle Laderman Ukeles in New York before relocating to Portland, Oregon. She received her MFA in Art & Social Practice at Portland State University in 2010.

== Work ==
Jacob's work has been presented in the NW Biennial at the Tacoma Art Museum, Disjecta's Portland 2012 Biennial, The Open Engagement Conference, and the Discourse and Discord Symposium at the Walker Art Center.

In 2013, her project "As you make your bed so you must lie in it" took place at the Portland Building, supported by the Regional Arts & Culture Council Project Grant. This participatory installation invited people onto a bed with her to talk about and edit the American Constitution.

In 2016, Jacob and Ralph Pugay created S.A.D park on Pioneer Courthouse Square as part of a Houseguest Residency. The interactive installation was created as an attempt to help with seasonal affective disorder through exposing people to bright lights, programming guided meditations and puppy playtimes.
