= Ariana Guido =

Actress, comedienne

- Occupations: Actress, comedian
- Years active: 2009–present

Ariana Guido is an American actress and comedian. Her career began in 2009, when she started performing stand-up comedy and appeared in a short film called Jimmy's Construction.

Guido has performed several times on stage, including a children's comedy show called "Jokes 4 Kids" at the Jon Lovitz Comedy Club at Universal CityWalk Hollywood. The show ran for ten weeks in the summer of 2010. The show's creator Vic Dunlop described it as "musical comedy, stand-up, improv, all of which teach kids how to think on their feet."

Guido has appeared in several television shows, including Childrens Hospital, General Hospital, Good Luck Charlie, Shake It Up, Sonny with a Chance and Wizards of Waverly Place.

Guido is of Italian descent. She was born to parents Laurine and Mike Guido, also a comedian.
