= Ariadna Mikeshina =

Russian-born pianist and composer (1900–1982)

Ariadna Mikeshina Ариадна Михайловна Микешина
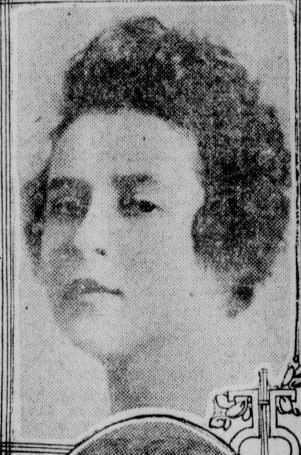
- Mikeshina, from a 1920 newspaper.

Background information
- Born: Ariadna Roumanova; October 17, 1900; Russia
- Died: May 18, 1982 (aged 81) United States
- Genres: Classical
- Occupations: Pianist, composer
- Instrument: Piano
- Years active: 1918–1975
- Spouses: Michel Roumanoff; Lev Ter-Oganov; Vincent O. Clarke (m. 1952–1958)

Ariadna Mikeshina (Russian: Ариадна Михайловна Микешина; October 17, 1900 – May 18, 1982), earlier known as Ariadna Roumanova, was a Russian-born pianist and composer.

== Early life ==
Ariadna Roumanova was the daughter of an admiral in the Russian navy. She was trained as a musician at the imperial conservatory in St. Petersburg. Her brother-in-law Leonid Bolotine was a violinist and later a guitarist.

== Career ==
Roumanova was called "a brilliant pianist and a most interesting composer" when she relocated to the United States in 1918. While in Los Angeles, she gave concerts, sometimes featuring her own compositions, and accompanied others in recital. She also appeared in the 1922 silent film adaptation of the Rubaiyat, and taught piano students in her studio.

As Ariadna Mikeshina, she performed regularly in Los Angeles New York City into her seventies. In 1927 the Los Angeles Times described her as a composer, having "marked talent, but not excessive originality". She was described in 1975 as "calmly ignor[ing] the last 75 years of musical thought" in a recital at Carnegie Hall.

== Personal life ==
Mikeshina was married at least five times. Her first husband was journalist Michel Roumanoff, who served in the Russian Provisional Government. She moved to Tokyo with Roumanoff when he was a diplomat at the Russian mission there; the couple moved to California when the Kerensky government fell. Her mother, brother and sister became refugees in Constantinople by 1921, when she divorced Roumanoff and went to join them. She returned to the United States with them in 1923, using the surname "Mikeshina". Her fourth husband was cellist Lev Ter-Oganov and her fifth husband was trombonist Vincent O. Clarke; the Clarkes married in 1952 and divorced in 1958.

After her death in 1982, at age 81, a collection of her musical manuscripts was donated to the Russian State Archive of Literature and Art. Other papers of hers are in the Elena Mogilat Papers at Columbia University, and in the Yeichi Nimura and Lisan Kay Nimura papers at the New York Public Library.

She is buried at the Russian Orthodox Convent Novo-Diveevo in Nanuet, New York.
