= Erofili =

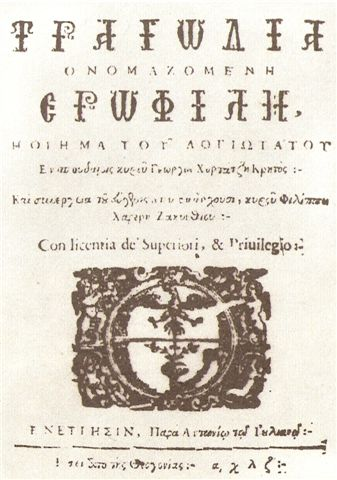
- Cover of the 1637 editio princeps of Erofili
- Author: Georgios Chortatzis
- Original title: Ερωφίλη
- Language: Greek
- Genre: Tragedy
- Publication date: 1637
- Publication place: Venetian Crete

Erofili, also spelled Erophile (Greek: Ερωφίλη, Greek pronunciation: [eroˈfi.li]), is the most famous and often performed tragedy of Cretan literature. It was written around 1600 in Rethymno in Crete (then a Venetian colony) by Georgios Chortatzis and first published in 1637 in Venice, probably after Chortatzis' death.

== Composition ==
Although the exact date is unknown, Chortatzis must have started to work on Erofili during the last few years of the 16th century. As was customary at the time, Erofili was written in verse. The composition consists of 3205 verses in Cretan Greek, rhymed in fifteen-syllable except from the choral parts which are in hendecasyllable terza rima form. Erofili is organized in five acts, between which there are four lyrical interludes (intermezzi). Erofili is modeled after Orbecche by Giovanni Battista Giraldi (published in 1547), however it includes several changes in the plot and is dramatically more concise. The interludes are inspired by the Rinaldo and Armida episode from Torquato Tasso's Jerusalem Delivered.

== Plot summary ==
Filogonos, king of Memphis in Egypt, murders his brother to gain his throne and marries his widow. Filogonos has a daughter, Erofili, which he raises together with Panaretos, an orphan boy of royal descent. Due to his competence at war, Panaretos is proclaimed general of the King's army. A love affair develops between Panaretos and Erofili and leads to their secret marriage. Filogonos, who planned to wed Erofili to the heir of a rival kingdom, asks Panaretos to act as an intermediary. This results in the secret marriage's disclosure and the King's rage. Filogonos orders the death of Panaretos and sends his head, heart and hands as a wedding gift to his daughter. Upon receiving the appalling gift, Erofili stabs herself to death. The chorus of maids overthrows Filogonos and kills him.

== Reception ==
Along with Erotokritos, a long romantic poem, Erofili stands at the apogee of the Cretan Renaissance literature. It became a popular read in several Greek-speaking regions and parts of it were even orally passed from generation to generation.

== Sources ==
- Puchner, Walter (1991), "Tragedy", in Holton, David (ed.), Literature and Society in Renaissance Crete, New York: Cambridge University Press, pp. 129–158, ISBN 0-521-32579-X
