= Ariane Schréder =

French writer

Ariane Schréder is a French writer. She is known for her novels Et mon luth constellé and La Silencieuse (2013). The latter won the René-Fallet prize and the Folire prize. She lives in Paris.
