= Georgios Chortatzis =

16th century Greek dramatist

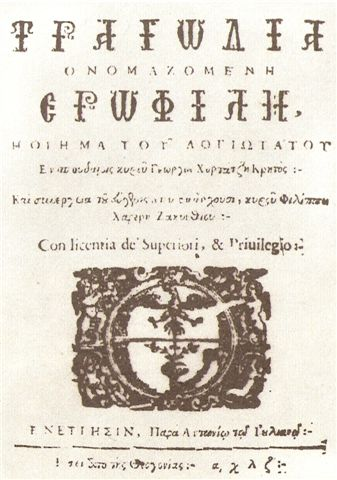
- Cover of Erofili (1637 edition)
- Born: c. 1550; Rethymno, Crete (then Kingdom of Candia)
- Died: c. 1660
- Known for: Literature
- Notable work: Erofili, Katsourbos, Panoria
- Movement: Cretan Renaissance, Cretan literature

Georgios Chortatzis or Chortatsis (Greek: Γεώργιος Χορτάτζης/Χορτάτσης; c. 1545 – c. 1610) was a Greek dramatist in Cretan verse. He was, along with Vitsentzos Kornaros, one of the main representatives of a school of literature in the vernacular Cretan dialect that flourished in the late 16th and early 17th centuries under Venetian rule. His best-known work is Erofili (or Erophile), a tragedy set in Egypt.
