= Cretan Greek =

Dialect of modern Greek

- Κρητική Διάλεκτος
- Pronunciation: kritiˈci ðiˈalektos
- Native to: Greece, Syria
- Region: Crete
- Language family: Indo-European: Hellenic; Attic–Ionic; Greek; Southern; Cretan Greek
- Writing system: Greek alphabet

Language codes
- ISO 639-3: –
- Glottolog: cret1244
- Linguasphere: 56-AAA-ag
- IETF: el-u-sd-grm

Cretan Greek, or the Cretan dialect (Greek: Κρητική Διάλεκτος, [kritiˈci ðiˈalektos]), is a variety of Modern Greek spoken in Crete and by the Cretan diaspora.

== Geographic distribution ==
The Cretan dialect is spoken by the majority of the Cretan Greeks on the island of Crete, as well as by several thousands of Cretans who have settled in major Greek cities, most notably in Athens. The dialect also survived in the major centers of the Greek diaspora in the United States, Australia, and Germany.

In addition, the descendants of many Cretan Muslims, who left the island during the 19th and early 20th century, continue to use it today, albeit rarely. They constitute the majority of the overall population in Ayvalık and Cunda Island as a result of the population exchange between Greece and Turkey in 1923. There is another grouping of Cretan Muslims in the coastal town of al-Hamidiyah, Syria, and in the neighboring territory of Lebanon. Some of these Cretan-speaking families moved back to Crete as refugees from the Syrian Civil War.

== Phonology ==
Standard Greek has an allophonic alternation between velar consonants ([k], [ɡ], [x], [ɣ]) and palatalized counterparts ([c], [ɟ], [ç], [ʝ]) before front vowels (/i/, /e/). In southern dialects, the palatalization goes further towards affricates; for example, [tɕe] is used instead of standard [ce] 'and'). Subtypes can be distinguished that have either palato-alveolar ([tʃ], [dʒ], [ʃ], [ʒ]) or alveolo-palatal sounds ([tɕ], [dʑ], [ɕ], [ʑ]). The former are reported for Cyprus, the latter for Crete and elsewhere.

== Grammar ==
In Standard Greek, the interrogative pronoun 'what?' is ti. In most of the Aegean Islands, except at its geographical fringe (Rhodes in the southeast; Lemnos, Thasos and the Sporades in the north and Andros in the west), it is inda, like in Cypriot Greek.

== Usage and settings ==
Today, the Cretan dialect is rarely used in writing. However, Cretan Greeks normally communicate with each other in speech using this dialect. Cretan does not differ greatly from the other Greek dialects or from Standard Greek, leading to a fairly high level of mutual intelligibility. Many organisations of Cretans aim to preserve their culture, including their dialect; as such, the dialect does not seem to be in danger of extinction.

== History ==
Like all other modern Greek dialects (except Tsakonian and, to some extent, Griko), Cretan evolved from Koine. Its structure and vocabulary have preserved some features that distinguish it from standard Greek, owing to the distance of Crete from other main Greek centers.

Cretan Greek also shows influences from other languages. The conquest of Crete by the Andalusian Moors in 824 left behind mainly toponyms. Venetian influence proved to be stronger, since the island remained under Venetian control for nearly five centuries. To this day, many toponyms, names, and other local words stem from the Venetian language of early modern times, which came to reinforce Latin influences from antiquity and the early Byzantine Empire. Following the Ottoman conquest of 1669, Turkish words entered the vocabulary of Cretans as well. Borrowings, as usual, were mainly lexical; Arabic, Turkish, and Venetian had little or no effect on grammar and syntax. With the beginning of the 20th century and the evolution of technology and tourism, English, French, and German terms became widely used.

== Literature ==
Medieval works suggest that Modern Greek started shaping as early as the 10th century, with one of the first works being the epic poem of Digenis Acritas. However, the first literary production in the Cretan dialect which was important enough to be identified as "modern Greek literature" comes from the 16th century.

Erotokritos is a romantic work written around 1600 by Vitsentzos Kornaros (1553–1613). In over 10,000 lines of rhyming fifteen-syllable couplets, the poet relates the trials and tribulations suffered by two young lovers, Erotokritos and Aretousa, daughter of Heracles, King of Athens. It was a tale that enjoyed enormous popularity among its Greek readership.

The poets of the period of Cretan literature (15th-17th centuries) used the spoken Cretan dialect. The tendency to purge the language of foreign elements was above all represented by the poet Georgios Chortatzis, Kornaros, and the anonymous poets of Voskopoula and the Sacrifice of Abraham. As dictated by the pseudo-Aristotelian theory of decorum, the heroes of the works use a vocabulary analogous to their social and educational background. It was thanks to this convention that the Cretan comedies were written in a language that was an amalgam of Italicisms, Latinisms, and the local dialect, thereby approximating to the actual language of the middle class of the Cretan towns. The time span separating Antonios Achelis, author of the Siege of Malta (1570), and Chortatsis and Kornaros is too short to allow for the formation, from scratch, of the Cretan dialect that is seen in the texts of the latter two. The only explanation, therefore, is that the poets at the end of the sixteenth century were consciously employing a particular linguistic preference – they were aiming at a pure style of language for their literature and, via that language, a separate identity for the Greek literary production of their homeland.

The flourishing Cretan school was all but terminated by the Turkish capture of the island in the 17th century. The ballads of the klephts, however, survive from the 18th century; these are the songs of the Greek mountain fighters who carried on guerrilla warfare against the Turks.

Many Greek authors have integrated Cretan literary elements in their respective works. Among these authors were Nikos Kazantzakis, mainly known for his writings in standard Greek. This paradigm, overall, has helped Kazantzakis to write significant works such as Zorba the Greek and thus establish for himself recognition in various international circles. His Captain Michalis – set in 19th-century Crete – is notable for using many Cretan Greek words and idioms; the book's popularity making them widely known to other Greeks.

Examples of Cretan dialect

- parastekoulizo = To wander aimlessly, originating from the need to describe people who were indeed wandering around tables, during a festival/feast, without a reason. The standard Greek version of this, is periferomai (to wonder).
- eida and gianta = What, and why. The standard Greek version of these are 'ti' and 'giati'.
- milei (speaks), thorei (thinks), gennei (becomes) thetei (sleeps) = In standard Greek, those verbs are slightly different, since milaei is used for 'speaks', 'theorei' is used for 'thinks', 'ginnei' for 'becomes', and 'koimatai' is used for 'sleeps', as 'thetei' in Standard Greek means 'to put' or in this case, 'he/she/it is putting'.
- aiga = goat. In Standard Greek, the word for goat is 'katsika', and aiga is not used as often
- mplio (pronounced 'blio') = anymore, used as in "I can't do this anymore", not as often used in questions. The Standard Greek version of this is 'peia', which sounds pretty similar.
- prama = This heavily depends on the use. In Standard Greek, prama means 'thing'. But in Cretan Greek, it is used as either 'nothing' or 'anything', depending on the context. For example, someone who speaks the dialect, could say "Θέλεις πράμα;" (Theleis prama?), which would translate to "Do you want anything?", but the response could very much, also be 'prama', which would translate to 'nothing', as a response.
- de logo = instantly, the Cretan Greek version of the Standard Greek "sto pi kai fi" (saying, also meaning instantly). Originating from the medieval Italian/Roman phrase 'di longo' , which used to mean 'without a stop', or simply 'instantly'. Similar to the Corfiot phrase "delengou", said to be inspired by the same thing.
- bare mou = used either as "at least" or "then", depending on what you want to say. There's no direct translation to this in Standard Greek, someone would simply use the words 'toulaxiston', (at least) or 'tote' (then). Originating from the Ottoman/Turkish word 'baris', having the same meaning.

‌

‌

== See also ==
- Modern Greek literature
- History of Crete
