= Uliga =

Island district in the Marshall Islands

Coordinates: 7°05′14.28″N 171°22′34.72″E

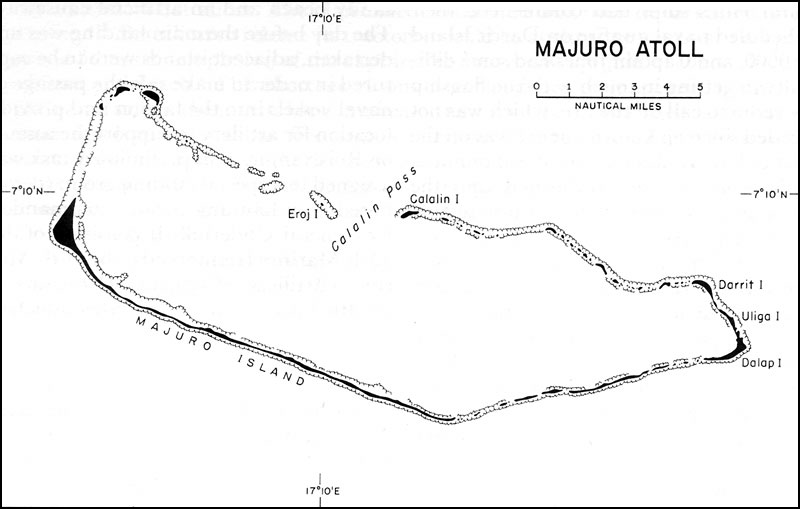
Majuro Atoll map

Uliga (Marshallese: Wūlka, [wɯlʲ(i)ɡɑ]) is an island district in the Marshall Islands, located in the eastern portion of Majuro Atoll. Along with Delap and Djarrit, it forms a town known as "Delap-Uliga-Djarrit".

The terrain is about 2 metres above sea level. Variant forms of spelling for Majuro Uliga exist in several different languages: Urego To, Uliga Island, Vuleka, Ulika, Ulliga, Urega-tō, Uliga Island, Ulika, Ulliga, Urega-to, Urega-tō, Urego To, Vuleka.

On January 30, 1944, United States troops invaded and built a large base, Naval Base Majuro.

== Climate ==
Climate data for Kaven
Month	Jan	Feb	Mar	Apr	May	Jun	Jul	Aug	Sep	Oct	Nov	Dec	Year
Mean daily maximum °C (°F)	29 (84)	29 (84)	29 (84)	29 (84)	29 (84)	29 (84)	29 (84)	30 (86)	30 (86)	30 (86)	30 (86)	29 (84)	29 (84)
Mean daily minimum °C (°F)	24 (75)	24 (75)	24 (75)	24 (75)	24 (75)	24 (75)	24 (75)	24 (75)	24 (75)	24 (75)	24 (75)	24 (75)	24 (75)
Average precipitation cm (inches)	20 (8)	17 (6.7)	21 (8.3)	28 (11)	30 (11.7)	30 (11.7)	33 (12.9)	29 (11.5)	33 (12.8)	36 (14.3)	34 (13.3)	28 (11.1)	338 (133.2)
Source: Weatherbase
