= Arianna Neikrug =

American jazz musician

Arianna Neikrug (born 19 April 1993) is an American jazz singer, songwriter, and arranger.

Neikrug was born in Los Angeles, California.

== Discography ==
- 2018: Changes (Concord Jazz)
