= Vitsentzos Kornaros =

16th-century Cretan poet

- Βικέντιος Κορνάρος
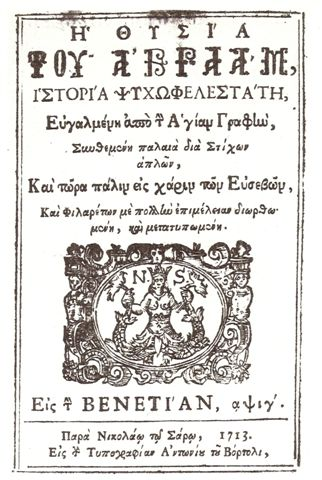
- Cover of The Sacrifice of Abraham by Vitsentzos Kornaros (1713 edition)
- Born: Vincenzo Cornaro; 1553; Trapezonda, Sitia, Kingdom of Candia
- Died: 1613/1614 (aged 59-61); Candia, Kingdom of Candia
- Writing career
- Language: Greek language
- Notable works: Erotokritos, The Sacrifice of Abraham
- Literary movement: Cretan Renaissance, Cretan literature

Vitsentzos or Vikentios Kornaros (Greek: Βιτσέντζος or Βικέντιος Κορνάρος) or Vincenzo Cornaro (March 29, 1553 – 1613/1614) was a Cretan poet of Venetian origin, who wrote the romantic epic poem Erotokritos. He wrote in vernacular Cretan dialect (Cretan Greek), and was a leading figure of the Cretan School.

Vitsentzos Kornaros is considered to be the greatest of all the Cretan poets and one of the most significant and influential figures in the entire course of Greek poetry. The son of a Venetian-Cretan aristocrat and a scion of the noble Venetian family of Cornaro, he was born near Sitia, Crete in 1553. Later, when he married, he came to live in Candia (now Heraklion) where he joined the Accademia dei Stravaganti. Kornaros died in 1613 (or 1614), just before his contemporaries, William Shakespeare and Miguel de Cervantes.

== Biography ==
Not many biographic sources exist about Kornaros apart from the last verses of Erotokritos. It is believed that he was born to a wealthy family in Trapezonda (Τραπεζόντα), a village near Sitia, Crete, in 1553, and lived there roughly up to 1590. He then moved to Candia (modern Iraklion), where his marriage to Marietta Zeno took place. Together they had two daughters named Helen and Katerina.

In 1591 Kornaros became an administrator, and during the outbreak of plague from 1591 to 1593 he worked as a sanitary supervisor.

He showed interest in literature and was a member of a literary group called Accademia degli Stravaganti (Academy of the Strange Ones), which was founded by his brother and fellow writer Andrea Cornaro, who wrote in Italian language.

He died in Candia, in 1613 (or 1614), and was buried at the church of San Francesco. The cause of his death remains unknown.

Alternate spellings of his first name include Vincenzo, Vitzentzos or Vikentios.

Kornaros' "Erotokritos" was a source of inspiration for Dionysios Solomos and influenced Greek poets such as Kostis Palamas, Krystallis and Seferis.

== Monument ==
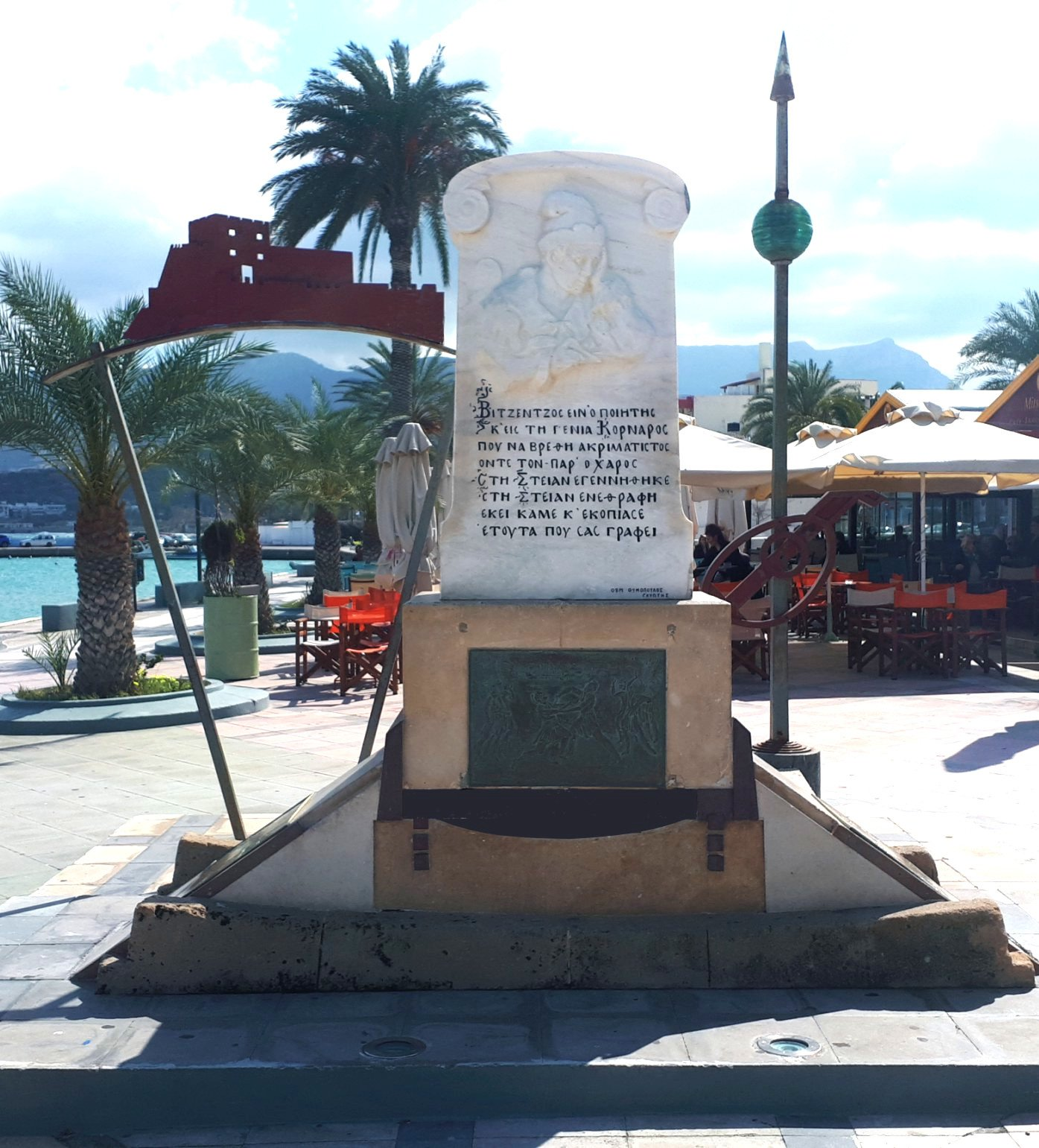
Sitia statue of Vitsentzos Kornaros

Monument dedicated to the Sitian poet Vicenzos Cornaros, work of the sculptor Thomas Thomopoulos

== His legacy ==
After him named:

- The Kornaros square in Heraklion
- The Vitsentzos Kornaros Technopolis
- A ferryboat, connecting the Greek islands Kythera and Antikythera with Crete, the Peloponnese and Piraeus.
- The Vitsentzos Kornaros cinema in Heraklion
- The Sitia Public Airport in his hometown of Sitia was officially named after him in January 15, 2015.
