= 2003 Marshallese general election =

- 17 November 2003

All 33 seats in the Nitijeļā 17 seats needed for a majority

General elections were held in the Marshall Islands on 17 November 2003. Although there are no legally incorporated political parties on the Islands, candidates to the Legislature stood either as supporters of President Kessai Note's government (constituting an informal "United Democratic Party"), or on an opposition platform (Aelon̄ Kein Ad).

== Results ==
The pro-government side increased its overall majority by one seat.

Party	Seats
United Democratic Party	20
Others	13
Total	33
Source: IPU

=== By constituency ===
Constituency	Candidate	Votes	Notes
Ailinglaplap (2)	Ruben Zackhras	754	Elected
Ailinglaplap (2)	Christopher Loeak	544	Elected by lot
Ailinglaplap (2)	Katzuo Joribwij Katjang	544	
Ailuk (1)	Maynard Alfred	465	Elected
Ailuk (1)	Hemos Jack	364	
Arno (2)	Nidel Lorak	823	Elected
Arno (2)	Gerald Zackios	804	Elected
Arno (2)	Adelbert Laukon	168	
Arno (2)	Allen Lanki	92	
Aur (1)	Norman Matthew	418	Elected
Aur (1)	Patrick Langmoir	171	
Aur (1)	Danny Jack	24	
Ebon (1)	John Silk	675	Elected
Ebon (1)	Thomas Kijiner	209	
Ebon (1)	Jien Lekka	62	
Enewetak (1)	Ishmael John	351	Elected
Enewetak (1)	Samson Yoshitaro	166	
Jabat (1)	Kessai Note	—	Elected unopposed
Jaluit (2)	Alvin Jacklick	986	Elected
Jaluit (2)	Rien Morris	956	Elected
Jaluit (2)	Alden Jacklick	263	
Jaluit (2)	Fredrik Jitto de Brum	197	
Kili/Bikini/Ejit (1)	Tomaki Juda	—	Elected unopposed
Kwajalein (3)	Michael Kabua	1,075	Elected
Kwajalein (3)	Justin de Brum	762	Elected
Kwajalein (3)	Jeban Riklon	631	Elected
Kwajalein (3)	Bobby Muller	465	
Kwajalein (3)	Ataji Balos	435	
Kwajalein (3)	Sato Maie	364	
Kwajalein (3)	Steven Kori Dribo	329	
Lae (1)	Relang Lemari	240	Elected
Lae (1)	Atbi Riklon	78	
Lae (1)	Rino Phillip	38	
Lib (1)	Alden Bejang	99	Elected
Lib (1)	Rudy Paul	63	
Likiep (1)	Donald Capelle	323	Elected
Likiep (1)	Tom Kijiner	304	
Likiep (1)	John Bungitak	181	
Majuro (5)	Alik Alik	2,639	Elected
Majuro (5)	Wilfred Kendall	2,636	Elected
Majuro (5)	Jurelang Zedkaia	2,494	Elected
Majuro (5)	Brenson Wase	2,436	Elected
Majuro (5)	Witten Philippo	2,278	Elected
Majuro (5)	Phillip Muller	1,701	
Majuro (5)	David Kramer	1,551	
Majuro (5)	Jiba Kabua	1,480	
Majuro (5)	Jack Jorbon	1,340	
Majuro (5)	Charles Takao Domnick	1,160	
Majuro (5)	Rosalie Konou	605	
Majuro (5)	Carmen Milne Bigler	592	
Majuro (5)	John Milne	294	
Majuro (5)	Bill Capelle	276	
Majuro (5)	Edwin Lakien	213	
Maloelap (1)	Michael Konelios	391	Elected
Maloelap (1)	Langmos Hermios	193	
Maloelap (1)	Taji Anjo	32	
Mejit (1)	Helkena Anni	384	Elected
Mejit (1)	Dennis Momotaro	372	
Mejit (1)	Sapon Keju	231	
Mejit (1)	Wallace Peter	135	
Mejit (1)	Frank Horiuchi	113	
Mejit (1)	Luckner Abner	108	
Mili (1)	Tadashi Lometo	548	Elected
Mili (1)	Kejjo Bien	489	
Namdrik (1)	Mattlan Zackhras	266	Elected
Namdrik (1)	Tony de Brum	178	
Namdrik (1)	Carl Heine	54	
Namdrik (1)	Elson Lenne	11	
Namu (1)	Kaiboke Kabua	324	Elected
Namu (1)	Joe Riklon	201	
Rongelap (1)	Abacca Anjain-Maddison	241	Elected
Rongelap (1)	Kenneth Kedi	224	
Rongelap (1)	Julian Riklon	159	
Ujae (1)	Caios Lucky	95	Elected
Ujae (1)	Frederick Muller	88	
Ujae (1)	Alee Alik	40	
Ujae (1)	Antonio Eliu	15	
Utrok (1)	Hiroshi V. Yamamura	272	Elected
Utrok (1)	Amenta Matthew	268	
Wotho (1)	Fountain Inok	147	Elected
Wotho (1)	David Kabua	100	
Wotho (1)	Namar N. Nashon	32	
Wotje (1)	Litokwa Tomeing	—	Elected unopposed
Source: Psephos
