= 2007 Marshallese general election =

- 19 November 2007

All 33 seats in the Nitijeļā 17 seats needed for a majority
- Turnout: 50.07%
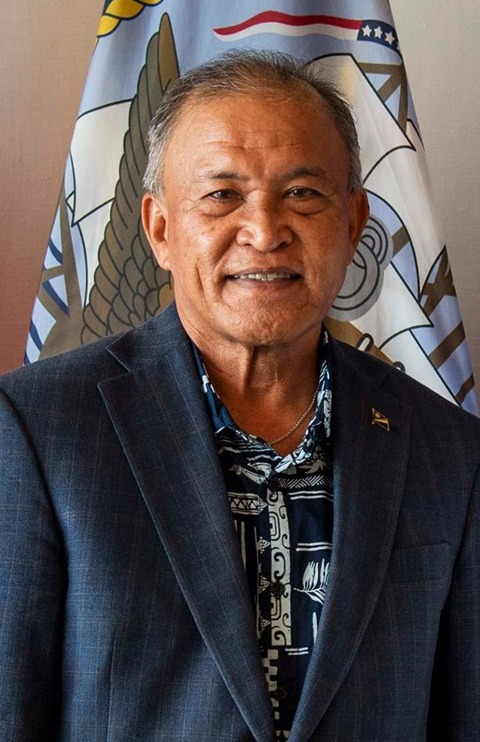

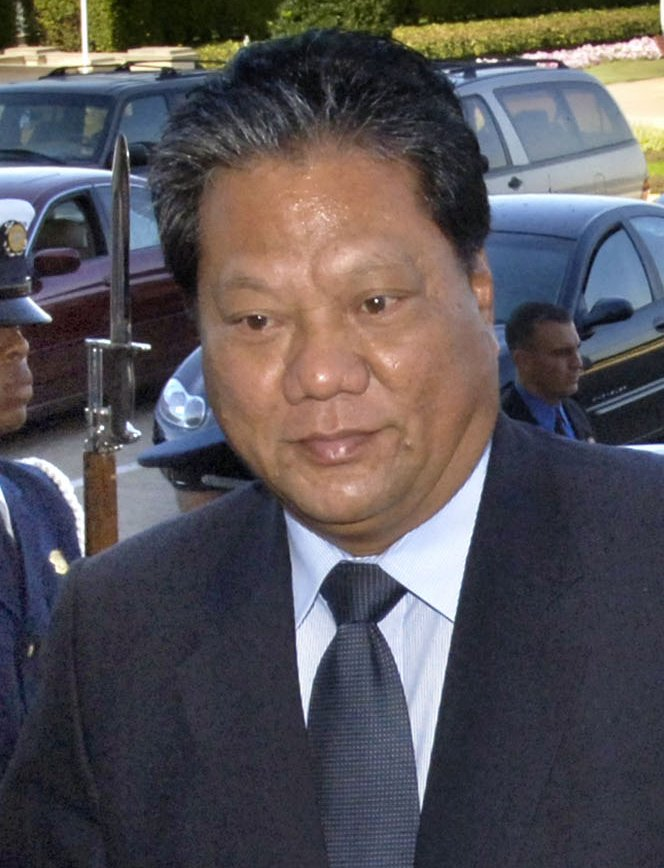
	Majority party	Minority party
Leader	David Kabua	Kassai Note
Party	Aelon̄ Kein Ad	UDP
Seats won	18	15

General elections were held in the Marshall Islands on 19 November 2007.

== Campaign ==
One of the election issues was whether to switch recognition from Taiwan to the China, with the opposition in favour of recognising China instead. However, Aelon Kein Ad stated on 28 November that they would not end ties with the ROC if they won the election.

== Conduct ==
Due to delays in opening the polling stations (while they were meant to open at 7 AM, some did not open until midday and one did not open before 4 PM) polling continued until after midnight. While only 36,000 people were eligible to vote, the large number of postal ballots meant that results were not to be known before 4 December.

== Results ==
Early results with 40% of the vote counted indicated a number of government party members could lose their seats, meaning it was possible that the opposition has won the election. On 30 November, the opposition Aelon̄ Kein Ad declared victory, claiming it had already won 15 of the 17 seats necessary for a majority and that it expected to gain about 20 to 22 seats.

The final vote count began on 4 December 2007. The opposition officially voiced their protest when the election website had not been updated by 8 December since the preliminary results were published on 27 November, questioning the legality of the recounting of votes from the outer islands, allegedly an attempt to change the results in four very close seats. The opposition party also claimed to have the necessary 17 senators to govern.

Final, unofficial results were released on 10 December; the candidates then had two weeks to file recount petitions and court challenges. As both the ruling United Democratic Party and the opposition Aelon Kein Ad claim to have the 17 MPs required to form a government, and since two seats were decided by a single vote and two others by five votes, many recount petitions are expected to be filed.

Figures from 12 December indicated that President Kassai Note's United Democratic Party had 14 seats while the opposition United People's Party (which forms part of the Aelon Kein Ad coalition), led by former speaker Litokwa Tomeing, had 15 seats. Aelon̄ Kein Ad continued to claim they had the 17 seats necessary to govern, and the election was considered likely be decided by the courts.

Both parties attempted to get independent MPs to join them, with both sides about two or three seats short of a majority.

Recounts for Maloelap and Likiep were ordered for 3 January 2008, and voters from the US have appealed for their votes to be counted as well despite some problems with the required post stamp.

Party	Votes	%	Seats
Aelon̄ Kein Ad			18
United Democratic Party			15
Total			33
Total votes	18,093	–	
Registered voters/turnout	36,134	50.07	
Source: IPU

=== By constituency ===
Constituency	Candidate	Votes	Notes
Ailinglaplap (2)	Christopher Loeak	917	Elected
Ailinglaplap (2)	Ruben Zackhras	568	Elected
Ailinglaplap (2)	Francis Horiuchi	448	
Ailinglaplap (2)	Gordon Note	440	
Ailinglaplap (2)	Harney Atjang Paul	91	
Ailuk (1)	Maynard Alfred	311	Elected
Ailuk (1)	Hemos Jack	193	
Ailuk (1)	Hackney Takju	70	
Arno (2)	Gerald Zackios	543	Elected
Arno (2)	Nidel Lorak	539	Elected
Arno (2)	Mike Halferty	379	
Arno (2)	Jiba Kabua	302	
Arno (2)	Weiner Kattil	242	
Arno (2)	Juan Lokot	101	
Arno (2)	Ruman Jorbal	74	
Aur (1)	Norman Matthew	209	Elected
Aur (1)	Danny Jack	92	
Ebon (1)	John Silk	534	Elected
Ebon (1)	Heran Bellu	349	
Enewetak (1)	Jack Ading	171	Elected
Enewetak (1)	Ishmael John	79	
Jabat (1)	Kessai Note	114	Elected
Jabat (1)	Abo Loeak	42	
Jaluit (2)	Alvin Jacklick	721	Elected
Jaluit (2)	Rien Morris	613	Elected
Jaluit (2)	Hilda Heine	458	
Jaluit (2)	Fredrik Jitto de Brum	272	
Jaluit (2)	John Kunar Bungitak	111	
Jaluit (2)	Lenist Lanki	111	
Kili/Bikini/Ejit (1)	Tomaki Juda	441	Elected
Kili/Bikini/Ejit (1)	March Samuel	218	
Kwajalein (3)	Michael Kabua	883	Elected
Kwajalein (3)	Tony de Brum	746	Elected
Kwajalein (3)	Jeban Riklon	593	Elected
Kwajalein (3)	Sato Maie	386	
Kwajalein (3)	Ataji Balos	219	
Kwajalein (3)	Steven Kori Dribo	197	
Lae (1)	Relang Lemari	177	Elected
Lae (1)	Charles de Brum	77	
Lae (1)	Rino Phillip	72	
Lae (1)	Jolbo Samuel	25	
Lib (1)	Jerakoj Bejang	263	Elected
Lib (1)	Irumne Bondrik	202	
Likiep (1)	Tom Kijiner	319	Elected
Likiep (1)	Donald Capelle	314	
Majuro (5)	Jurelang Zedkaia	2,330	Elected
Majuro (5)	Alik Alik	1,774	Elected
Majuro (5)	David Kramer	1,668	Elected
Majuro (5)	Brenson Wase	1,665	Elected
Majuro (5)	Wilfred Kendall	1,506	Elected
Majuro (5)	Phillip Muller	1,453	
Majuro (5)	Amatlain Kabua	1,415	
Majuro (5)	Witten Philippo	1,343	
Majuro (5)	Jack Jorbon	668	
Majuro (5)	Rosalie Konou	561	
Majuro (5)	Biuma Samson	538	
Majuro (5)	Jakeo Relang	461	
Majuro (5)	Melvin Narruhn	450	
Majuro (5)	Carl Heine	223	
Majuro (5)	Edwin Lakien	119	
Maloelap (1)	Michael Konelios	381	Elected
Maloelap (1)	Patrick Langmoir	380	
Maloelap (1)	Emil de Brum	26	
Mejit (1)	Dennis Momotaro	567	Elected
Mejit (1)	Helkena Anni	333	
Mejit (1)	Luckner Abner	116	
Mili (1)	Kejjo Bien	373	Elected
Mili (1)	Tadashi Lometo	297	
Mili (1)	Homer Graham	157	
Mili (1)	Alee Alik	72	
Mili (1)	Billy Billy	20	
Namdrik (1)	Mattlan Zackhras	272	Elected
Namdrik (1)	Rod Nakamura	267	
Namu (1)	Kaiboke Kabua	200	Elected
Namu (1)	Tony Aiseia	199	
Namu (1)	Anna Anien	106	
Rongelap (1)	Kenneth Kedi	281	Elected
Rongelap (1)	Atbi Riklon	268	
Rongelap (1)	Abacca Anjain-Maddison	153	
Ujae (1)	Fredrick Muller	141	Elected
Ujae (1)	Caios Lucky	45	
Ujae (1)	Marcella Sakaio	21	
Ujae (1)	William Swain	11	
Utrok (1)	Amenta Matthew	365	Elected
Utrok (1)	Hiroshi V. Yamamura	336	
Wotho (1)	David Kabua	223	Elected
Wotho (1)	Elmer Langbata	64	
Wotho (1)	Namar N. Nashon	32	
Wotje (1)	Litokwa Tomeing	—	Elected unopposed
Source: Psephos

== Aftermath ==
The newly elected Nitijela elected the president on 7 January 2008 after formally convening. Litokwa Tomeing was elected by 18 votes to 15 for incumbent president Kessai Note. A new Speaker from the opposition, Senator Jurelang Zedkaia, was also elected, defeating Senator Alvin Jacklick in another 18–15 vote. Senator Alik Alik from the United Democratic Party (the former government party) was elected as Vice-Speaker with 17 votes against 16 for Kaibuke Kabua.

Tomeing had defected from the United Democratic Party to the opposition United People's Party before the election.

According to the results of the presidential and speaker elections, the opposition (consisting of Aelon̄ Kein Ad and the UPP) seemed to have either 18 or 17 seats, as opposed to the former government's 15 or 16 seats.

=== Vote of no confidence in Tomeing ===
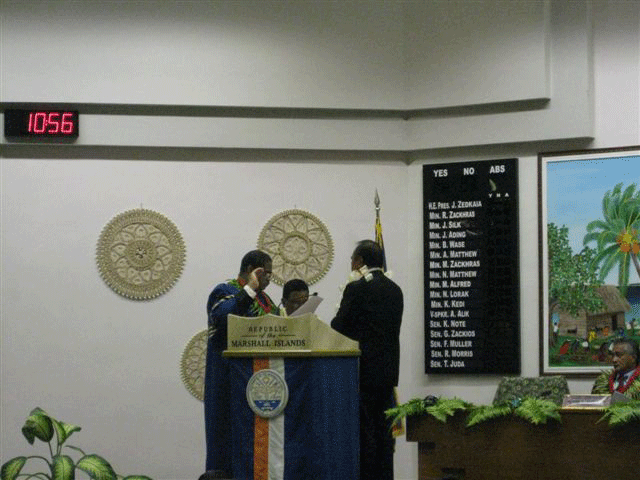
Zedkaia's swearing in as President on November 2, 2009

On 21 October 2009 Tomeing was ousted from the presidency in the nation's first successful vote of no confidence. He was temporarily replaced by Ruben Zackhras as acting president until the Nitijela elected a new president on 26 October. Only two candidates were nominated; Zedkaia and former president Kessai Note, who had led the no confidence measure against Tomeing. Tomeing and Kessai had engaged in a power struggle since Kessai had lost his re-election bid in the 2007 elections. Under the terms of the Marshallese constitution, the Nitijela had fourteen days to elect a new president.

Speaker Jurelang Zedkaia was elected with 17 votes to Note's 15. The results gave Zedkaia the one vote-minimum needed to defeat Kessai and win the presidency. Senators did not vote along party lines during the election, with several crossing the aisle to vote for the presidential candidates in opposing parties. Nitijela Senator Brenson Wase was quoted as describing the shifting political affiliations of the electors as being as mixed up "as a fruit salad."

Observers noted that Zedkaia is an Iroij, or traditional chief, like his predecessor, Litokwe Tomeing. Zedkaia's status as Iroij may have been key to his narrow one-vote victory in the election.

Zedkaia was sworn into office on November 2, 2009.
