= 1999 Marshallese general election =

Parliamentary elections were held in the Marshall Islands on 22 November 1999. As there were no political parties, all candidates for the 33 seats ran as independents. Following the election, Kessai Note was elected President by MPs.

== Results ==
Constituency	Candidate	Votes	Notes
Ailinglaplap (2)	Christopher Loeak	756	Elected
Ailinglaplap (2)	Ruben Zackhras	629	Elected
Ailinglaplap (2)	Eldon Note	323	
Ailinglaplap (2)	Rod Nakamura	172	
Ailuk (1)	Maynard Alfred	309	Elected
Ailuk (1)	Hemos Jack	307	
Arno (2)	Nidel Lorak	669	Elected
Arno (2)	Gerald Zackios	362	Elected
Arno (2)	Leikman Robert	284	
Arno (2)	Weiner Labin	204	
Arno (2)	Adelbert Laukon	161	
Arno (2)	Rumon Jorbal	80	
Arno (2)	Ben Injinmej	55	
Arno (2)	Katib Mack	20	
Aur (1)	Norman Matthew	294	Elected
Aur (1)	Mies Peter	250	
Aur (1)	Yoster John	35	
Ebon (1)	John Silk	402	Elected
Ebon (1)	Mamoru Kabua	319	
Ebon (1)	Kenson Alik	91	
Ebon (1)	Betwell Lekka	62	
Enewetak (1)	Ishmael John	—	Elected unopposed
Jabat (1)	Kessai Note	—	Elected unopposed
Jaluit (2)	Alvin Jacklick	855	Elected
Jaluit (2)	Rien Morris	751	Elected
Jaluit (2)	Kunar Abner	312	
Jaluit (2)	Carl Heine	286	
Jaluit (2)	Rosalie Konou	203	
Jaluit (2)	Sam Leon	153	
Kili/Bikini/Ejit (1)	Henchi Balos	305	Elected
Kili/Bikini/Ejit (1)	Johnny Johnson	120	
Kwajalein (3)	Imata Kabua	801	Elected
Kwajalein (3)	Sato Maie	480	Elected
Kwajalein (3)	Ataji Balos	443	Elected
Kwajalein (3)	Laji Taft	410	
Kwajalein (3)	Botlong Loeak	307	
Kwajalein (3)	Steve Dribo	225	
Lae (1)	Relang Lemari	322	Elected
Lae (1)	Susan Heine	213	
Lib (1)	Alden Bejang	99	Elected
Lib (1)	Rudy Paul	63	
Likiep (1)	Tom Kijiner	282	Elected
Likiep (1)	John Bungitak	225	
Likiep (1)	Kenneth Kramer	204	
Majuro (5)	Wilfred Kendall	2,568	Elected
Majuro (5)	Witten Philippo	2,565	Elected
Majuro (5)	Jurelang Zedkaia	2,357	Elected
Majuro (5)	Brenson Wase	1,966	Elected
Majuro (5)	Alik Alik	1,556	Elected
Majuro (5)	Jack Jorbon	1,397	
Majuro (5)	Philip Muller	1,278	
Majuro (5)	Tony deBrum	1,039	
Majuro (5)	Marie Maddison	833	
Majuro (5)	John Milne	694	
Maloelap (1)	Michael Konelios	263	Elected
Maloelap (1)	Lomes McKay	239	
Mejit (1)	Helkana Aini	235	Elected
Mejit (1)	Sepong Keju	222	
Mejit (1)	Carter Lokeijak	66	
Mejit (1)	W. Joran	41	
Mejit (1)	Alee Alik	13	
Mili (1)	Tadashi Lometo	257	Elected
Mili (1)	Kejjo Bien	206	
Mili (1)	B. Bollong	28	
Namdrik (1)	Jiba Kabua	347	Elected
Namdrik (1)	Augustine Nakamura	171	
Namdrik (1)	J. Ralpho	11	
Namu (1)	Kaiboke Kabua	112	Elected
Namu (1)	Yoda Nysta	73	
Namu (1)	Joe Riklon	64	
Rongelap (1)	Abacca Anjain-Maddison	238	Elected
Rongelap (1)	Ketnar Tima	189	
Rongelap (1)	Johnsay Riklon	177	
Rongelap (1)	Edison Anjain	45	
Rongelap (1)	Peter Eknilang	2	
Ujae (1)	Justin de Brum	—	Elected unopposed
Utrok (1)	Hiroshi V. Yamamura	—	Elected unopposed
Wotho (1)	Fountain Inok	93	Elected
Wotho (1)	Kunio Lemari	89	
Wotho (1)	N. Nemar	14	
Wotje (1)	Litokwa Tomeing	201	Elected
Wotje (1)	Charles Domnick	55	
Source: Psephos
