= 1979 Marshallese general election =

1979 general elections in Marshall

General elections were held in the Marshall Islands on 10 April 1979.

== Results ==
Four of the 33 seats in the Legislature were won by candidates representing the Voice of the Marshalls group, with the other 29 taken by independents.

Constituency	Elected member
Ailinglaplap Atoll	Atjang Paul
Ailinglaplap Atoll	Ruben Zackhras
Ailuk Atoll	Kunar Abner
Arno Atoll	Kanchi Ibbino
Arno Atoll	Katip Mack
Aur Atoll	Beasa Peter
Ebon Atoll	Ekpap Silk
Enewetak & Ujelang Atoll	Ishmael John
Jabot Island	Kessai Note
Jaluit Atoll	Carl Heine
Jaluit Atoll	Evelyn Konou
Kili, Bikini & Ejit Atoll	Henchi Balos
Kwajalein Atoll	Ataji Balos
Kwajalein Atoll	Imata Kabua
Kwajalein Atoll	Jolly Lojekar
Lae Atoll	Jimmy Akeang
Lib Atoll	Pijja Jerwan
Likiep Atoll	Tom Kijiner
Majuro Atoll	Amata Kabua
Majuro Atoll	Wilfred Kendall
Majuro Atoll	Jina Lavin
Majuro Atoll	Henry Samuel
Majuro Atoll	Toke Sawej
Maloelap Atoll	Namo Hermios
Mejit Island	Report Emius
Mili Atoll	Alee Alik
Namdrik Atoll	Andrew Hiseah
Namu Atoll	Atlan Anien
Rongelap Atoll	Jeton Anjain
Ujae Atoll	Calep Rantak
Utrik Atoll	Donald Matthew
Wotho Atoll	Mwejor Mathusla
Wotje Atoll	Litokwa Tomeing
Source: Legislature of the Marshall Islands

== Aftermath ==
Following the elections, the Legislature elected Amata Kabua as president. In preparation for self-government, a ten-member cabinet was formed on 1 May 1979.

Position	Member
President	Amata Kabua
Minister of Education	Tom Kijiner
Minister of Finance	Atjang Paul
Minister of Health	Henry Samuel
Minister of Internal Affairs	Wilfred Kendall
Minister of Internal Security	Ataji Balos
Minister of Public Works	Kunar Abner
Minister of Resources and Development	Kessai Note
Minister of Social Welfare	Jina Lavin
Minister of Transportation and Communications	Ruben Zackhras
