= Ministry of Finance (Marshall Islands) =

Agency overview
- Formed: 1990
- Jurisdiction: Marshall Islands
- Headquarters: Majuro, Marshall Islands
- Agency executive: David Paul, Minister
- Parent agency: Government of Marshall Islands
- Website: web.archive.org/web/20210125193601/https://rmi-mof.com/about-us/

Ministry of Finance of the Marshall Islands is a government ministry in the Marshall Islands responsible for providing a management system for public finances to manage revenue and fiscal functions of the Government of the Marshall Islands.

The ministry was established in 1990 under the 11 MIRC Chapter 1 Financial Management Act.

== Ministers of finance ==
Name	President	Took office	Left office
Atjang Paul	Amata Kabua	1979	1982
Charles Domnick	Amata Kabua	1982	1982
Toke Sawej	Amata Kabua	1982	1983-?
Amata Kabua	Amata Kabua	?	1984
Tom D. Kijiner	Amata Kabua	1984	1988
Henchi Balos	Amata Kabua	1988	1989
Ruben Zackhras	Amata Kabua; Kunio Lemari; Imata Kabua	1989	1997
Tony deBrum	Imata Kabua	1998	2000
Michael Konelios	Kessai Note	2000	2002
Brenson Wase	Kessai Note	2002	2008
Jack Ading	Litokwa Tomeing; Ruben Zackhras; Jurelang Zedkaia	2008	2012
Dennis Momotaro	Christopher Loeak	2012	2014
Jack Ading	Christopher Loeak; Casten Nemra	2014	2016
Brenson Wase	Hilda Heine	2016	2020
Alfred Alfred Jr.	David Kabua	2020	2021
Brenson Wase	David Kabua	2021	2023
Casten Nemra	David Kabua	2023	2024
David Paul	Hilda Heine	2024	Incumbent

== See also ==
- Government of the Marshall Islands
- Economy of the Marshall Islands
