= Imata Kabua =

President of the Marshall Islands from 1997 to 2000

His Highness His Excellency Iroijlaplap Imata Kabua
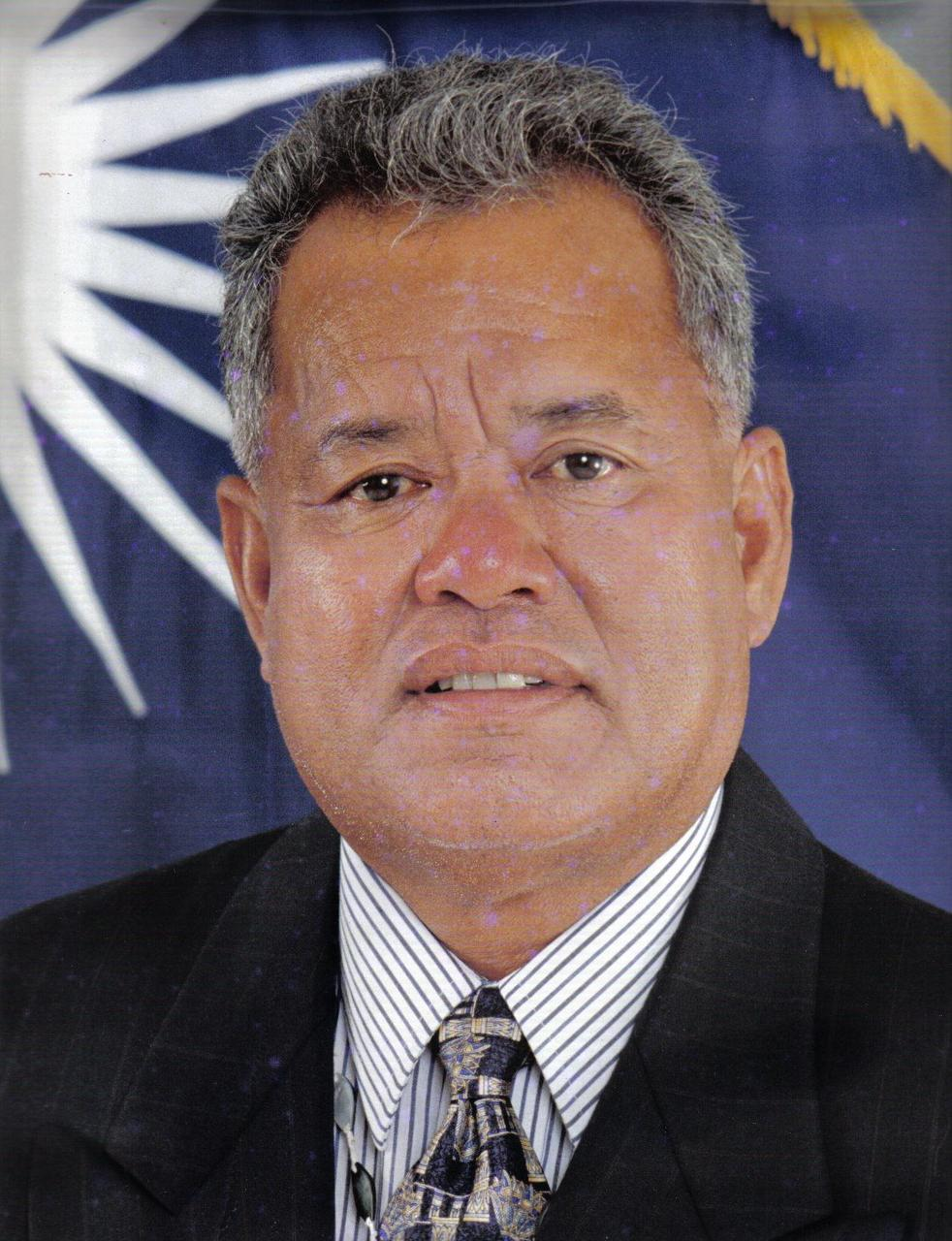

2nd President of the Marshall Islands
- In office January 14, 1997 – January 10, 2000
- Preceded by: Kunio Lemari (Acting)
- Succeeded by: Kessai Note

Iroijlaplap of Kwajalein
- In office December 19, 1996 – September 18, 2019
- Preceded by: Amata Kabua
- Succeeded by: Michael Kabua

Personal details
- Born: Imata Jebro Kabua; 20 May 1943 South Pacific Mandate, Empire of Japan
- Died: 18 September 2019 (aged 76) Honolulu, Hawaii, U.S.
- Party: Aelon̄ Kein Ad; United Democratic Party
- Spouse: Hiromi Kabua

Iroijlaplap Imata Jabro Kabua (20 May 1943 – 18 September 2019) was a Marshallese politician, who served as the president of the Marshall Islands from 1997 to 2000. He was the paramount chief of Kwajalein Atoll until his death and the wealthiest landowner on the atoll.

== Career ==
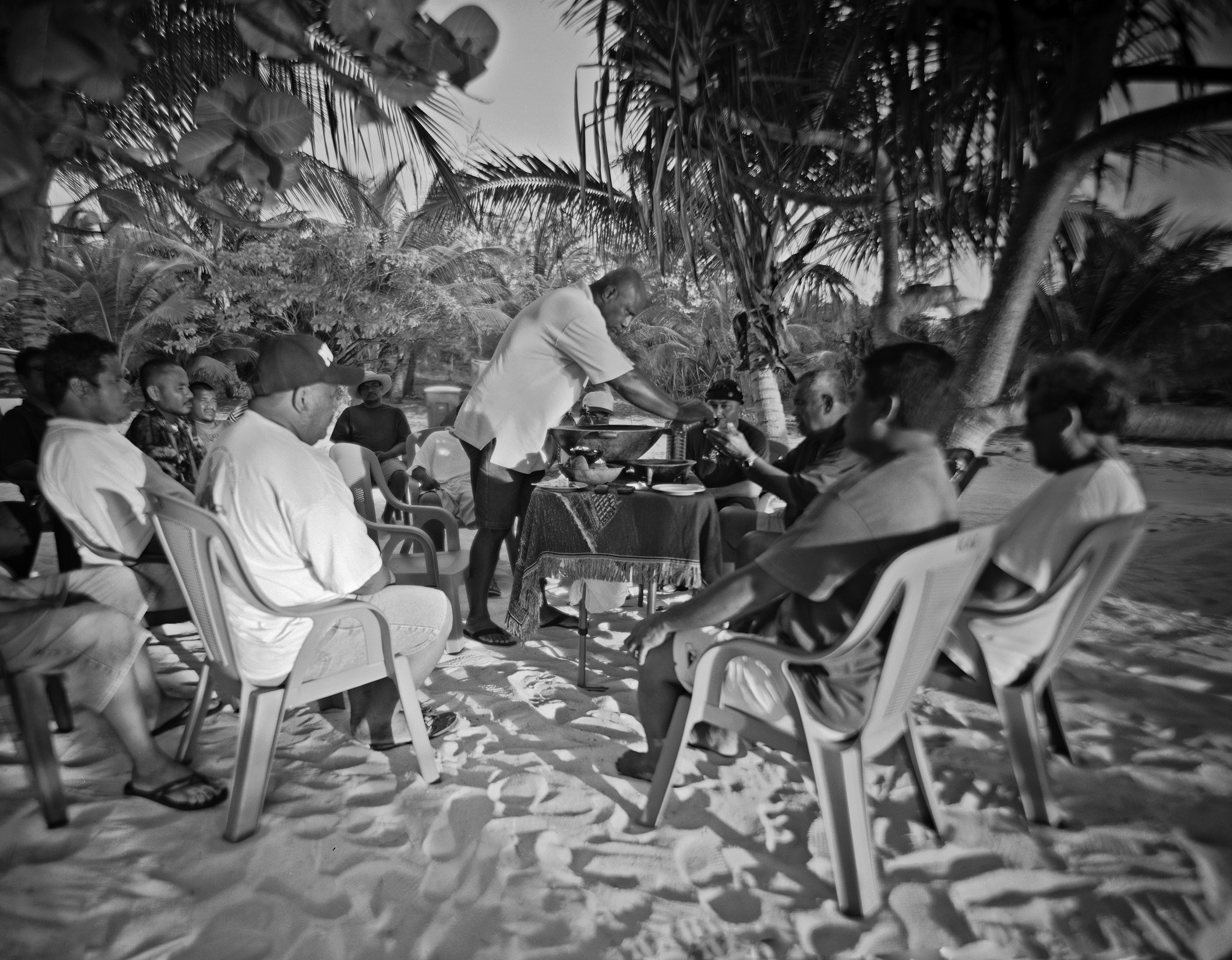
Kabua at the Kava Club

President Amata Kabua, Kabua's first cousin, died on 20 December 1996. Kabua was elected president with 20 votes against his opponents Wilfred Kendall and Kessai Note, who both received 6 votes.

Kabua successfully pushed for legislation to create casinos for tourists and other foreigners. The Nitijela voted on outlawing gambling in 1998, and Speaker Note ruled that Kabua, Tony deBrum, and Phillip H. Muller were not allowed to vote due to a conflict of interest. Kabua sued to have this overturned, but the High Court of the Marshall Islands ruled that the speaker was not subject to the jurisdiction of the court. The Supreme Court of the Marshall Islands upheld the decision of the High Court. The legislation was passed by a vote of 17 to 7.

Litokwa Tomeing brought a motion of no confidence against Kabua on 2 September 1998. The motion failed by a vote of 16 to 14 against on 16 October.

Kabua reshuffled his cabinet as the motion of no confidence was occurring and removed Christopher Loeak, Ruben Zackras, and Brenson Wasae while adding Hemos Jack as minister of justice, Hiroshi Yamamura as minister of internal affairs, Johnsay Riklon as minister in assistance to the president, and Kendall as minister of public works.

Kabua lost his seat in the 1999 election and was succeeded as president by Note. Kabua supported a motion of no confidence against Note in 2001, but it failed by a vote of 19 to 14.

== Personal life ==
Kabua was the wealthiest landowner on Kwajalein Atoll. He died in Honolulu, Hawaii, on 18 September 2019. After Kabua's death his title of Iroijlaplap was given to his brother Michael Kabua; Michael was coronated in 2022.

== Works cited ==
=== Books ===
- Dvorak, Greg (2018). Coral and Concrete: Remembering Kwajalein Atoll between Japan, America, and the Marshall Islands. University of Hawai'i Press. ISBN 9780824855215.

=== Journals ===
- Fraenkel, Jon (2002). "Strategic Registration from Metropolis to Periphery in the Republic of the Marshall Islands". The Journal of Pacific History. 37 (3). Taylor & Francis: 299–312. doi:10.2307/25169605. JSTOR 25169605.
- Peter, Joakim; Shuster, Donald; Walsh, Julianne; McPhetres, Samuel (2000). "Micronesia in Review: Issues and Events, 1 July 1998 to 30 June 1999". The Contemporary Pacific. 12 (1). University of Hawaiʻi Press: 194–220. doi:10.2307/23717486. JSTOR 23717486.
- Peter, Joakim; Shuster, Donald; Walsh, Julianne; McPhetres, Samuel (2002). "Micronesia in Review: Issues and Events, 1 July 2000 to 30 June 2001". The Contemporary Pacific. 14 (1). University of Hawaiʻi Press: 186–212. doi:10.2307/23717645. JSTOR 23717645.

=== News ===
- "Marshall Islands celebrate first 'Iroojlaplap' chief coronation in 50 years". France 24. 22 July 2022. Archived from the original on 28 July 2022.
- "Marshall Islands president chosen". Honolulu Star-Advertiser. 4 January 2000. p. A2 – via Newspapers.com.

=== Web ===
- "Nena Congratulates Imata Kabua". Government of the Federated States of Micronesia. 24 January 1997. Archived from the original on 13 November 2026.
- "USP installs 26th Chancellor". University of the South Pacific. 19 September 2026. Archived from the original on 19 October 2019.

Political offices
Preceded by Kunio Lemari	President of the Marshall Islands; 1997–2000	Succeeded by Kessai Note
Regnal titles
Preceded by Amata Kabua	Iroijlaplap of Kwajalein; 1996–2019	Succeeded by Michael Kabua
