= 1976 Marshallese Constitutional Convention election =

Constitutional Convention elections were held in the Marshall Islands in November 1976.

== Background ==
The calling of a convention was approved by a bill in the District Legislature in August 1976. The 48-member body was to draft a constitution in both English and Marshallese, and consisted of three Marshallese representatives in the Congress of the Trust Territory of the Pacific Islands (one senator and two representatives), the eight Iroij members of the District Legislature, the Iroijs of Arno, Mejit and Ujelang/Enewetak, a representative from Likiep and 33 elected members.

== Aftermath ==
Following the elections, the convention was opened in Majuro on 8 August 1977. Ruben Zackhras was elected president of the body.

After work had finished, a ceremony was held at Uliga Protestant Church in Majuro on 4 January 1979 for the formal signing of the constitution. Zackhras then presented the constitution to District Administrator Oscar DeBrum and Legislature Speaker Atlan Anien. The convention was then dissolved on A referendum on the draft constitution was organised for March 1979, with 64% of voters approving the document.
