= Government of the Marshall Islands =

The government of the Marshall Islands operates under a mixed parliamentary-presidential system as set forth in its Constitution. Elections are held every four years in universal suffrage (for all citizens above the age of 18), with each of the 24 constituencies (see below) electing one or more representatives (senators) to the lower house of RMI's unicameral legislature, the Nitijela. (Majuro, the capital atoll, elects five senators.) The President, who is head of state as well as head of government, is elected by the 33 senators of the Nitijela. Four of the five Marshallese presidents who have been elected since the Constitution was adopted in 1979 have been traditional paramount chiefs.

Governance occurs in a framework of a parliamentary representative democratic republic, and of an emerging multi-party system, whereby the President of the Marshall Islands is both head of state and head of government. Executive power is exercised by the government. Legislative power is vested in both the government and the Nitijela (Legislature). The Judiciary is independent of the executive and the legislature.

== Executive branch ==
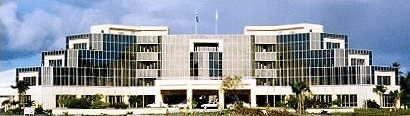
The Marshall Islands Capitol building

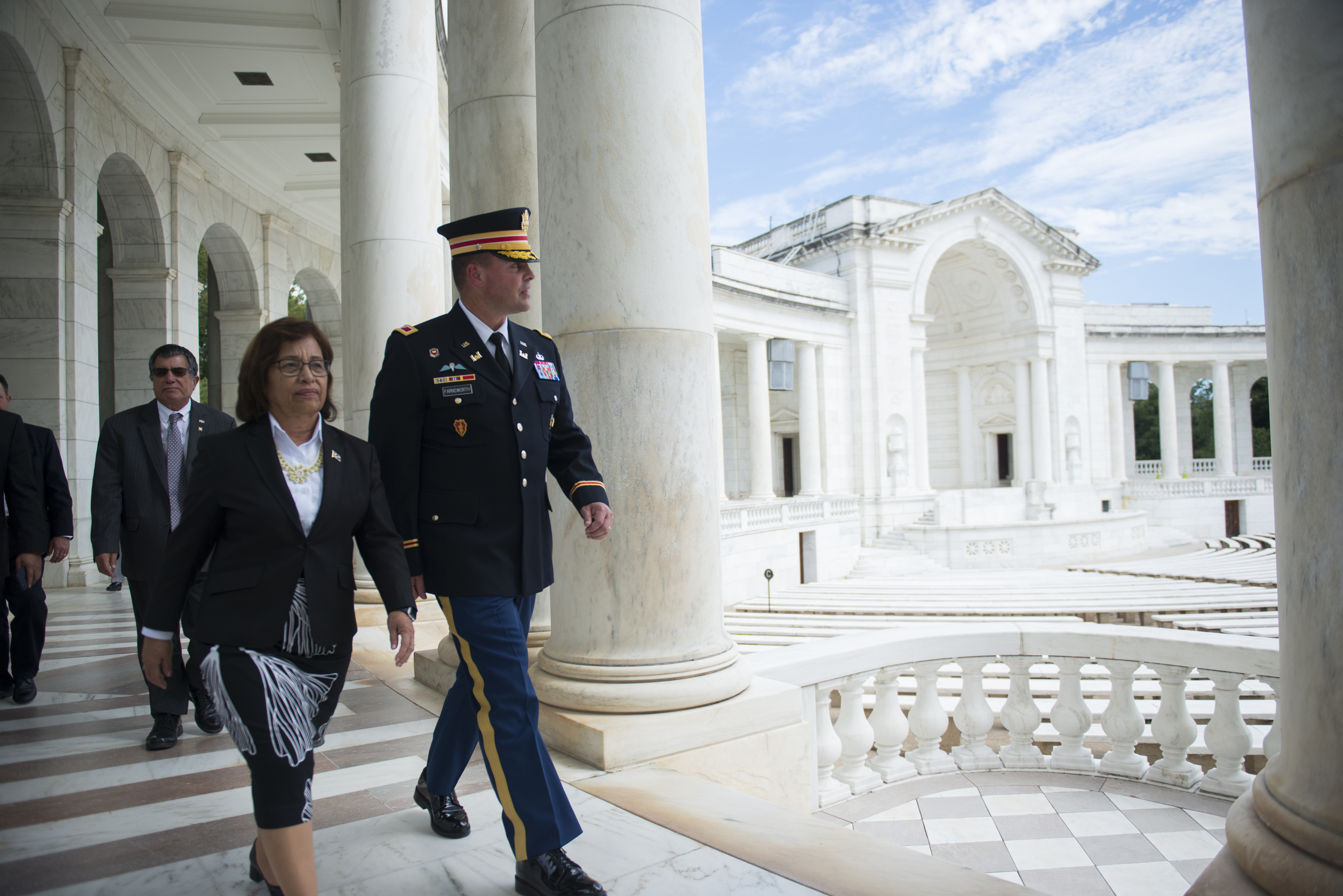
H.E. Hilda C. Heine, first woman and current president of the Marshall Islands, walking through the Memorial Amphitheater at Arlington National Cemetery Sept. 12, 2017.

The president is elected by the Nitijela from among its members. Presidents pick cabinet members from the Nitijela. Amata Kabua was elected as the first president of the republic in 1979. Subsequently, he was re-elected to four-year terms in 1983, 1987, 1991, and 1996. After Amata Kabua's death in office, his first cousin, Imata Kabua, won a special election in 1997. The current president was elected and took office on January 3, 2024.

The executive branch consists of the President and the Presidential Cabinet, which consists of ten ministers appointed by the President with the approval of the Nitijela. President appoints, among the members of Nitijela, Minister in Assistance to the President of Marshall Islands who acts as a substitute for the President.

In January 2020, David Kabua, son of founding president Amata Kabua, was elected as the new President of the Marshall Islands. His predecessor Hilda Heine lost the position after a vote. In January 2024, Heine returned to the presidency following the results of the 2023 Marshallese general election. Heine defeated Kabua by a 17–16 margin in the 33-seat legislature.

The Presidential cabinet includes offices of Minister-in-Assistance to the President, Minister of Justice, Minister of Finance and Minister of Foreign Affairs

The Presidential Cabinet is as follows:

Presidential Cabinet
Title
Minister of Justice, Immigration, and Labor
Minister-in-Assistance to the President and Environment
Minister of Health and Human Services
Minister of Education, Sports, and Training
Minister of Natural Resources and Commerce
Minister of Foreign Affairs and Trade
Minister of Transportation, Communications, and Information Technology
Minister of Finance, Banking, and Postal Services
Minister of Culture and Internal Affairs
Minister of Works, Infrastructure, and Utilities

== Legislative branch ==
The legislative branch of the government of the Marshall Islands consists of the unicameral Legislature (Nitijela) with an advisory council of high chiefs. Legislative power lies with the Nitijela. The Council of Iroij is an advisory body composed of 12 tribal chiefs. The Nitijela has 33 members, elected for a four-year term in 19 single-seat and five multi-seat constituencies. Members are called Senators. Elections in the Marshall Islands are officially nonpartisan, though candidates could be affiliated with one of the active political parties. There are currently four political parties in the Marshall Islands: Aelon Kein Ad (AKA), Kien Eo Am (KEA), United People's Party (UPP), and United Democratic Party (UDP).

=== Constituencies ===
The 24 electoral districts into which the country is divided correspond to the inhabited islands and atolls.

Constituency	Seats
Ailinglaplap Atoll	2
Ailuk Atoll	1
Arno Atoll	2
Aur Atoll	1
Ebon Atoll	1
Enewetak Atoll	1
Jabat Island	1
Jaluit Atoll	2
Kili Island	1
Kwajalein Atoll	3
Lae Atoll	1
Lib Island	1
Likiep Atoll	1
Majuro Atoll	5
Maloelap Atoll	1
Mejit Island	1
Mili Atoll	1
Namdrik Atoll	1
Namu Atoll	1
Rongelap Atoll	1
Ujae Atoll	1
Utirik Atoll	1
Wotho Atoll	1
Wotje Atoll	1

== Municipalities ==
The Marshall Islands is divided into 33 municipalities:

- Ailinginae (Aelōn̄in Ae)
- Ailinglaplap (Aelōn̄ļapļap)
- Ailuk (Aelok)
- Arno (Arņo)
- Aur (Aur)
- Bikar (Pikaar)
- Bikini (Pikinni)
- Ebon (Epoon)
- Enewetak (Ānewetak)
- Erikub (Ādkup)
- Jabat (Jebat)
- Jaluit (Jālwōj)
- Jemo (Jemo̧)
- Kili (Kōle)
- Kwajalein (Kuwajleen)
- Lae (Lae)
- Lib (Ellep)
- Likiep (Likiep)
- Majuro (Mājro)
- Maloelap (M̧aļoeļap)
- Mejit (Mājej)
- Mili (Mile)
- Namorik (Nam̧dik)
- Namu (Nam̧o)
- Rongelap (Ron̄ļap)
- Rongrik (Ron̄dik)
- Taongi (Bokaak)
- Toke (Tōkā)
- Ujae (Ujae)
- Ujelang (Wūjlan̄)
- Utirik (Utrōk)
- Wotho (Wōtto)
- Wotje (Wōjjā)

== Foreign affairs and defense ==
The Compact of Free Association with the United States gives the U.S. sole responsibility for international defense of the Marshall Islands. It allows islanders to live and work in the United States, and establishes economic and technical aid programs.

== Judicial branch ==
The Republic of the Marshall Islands has four court systems: Supreme Court, High Court, district and community courts, and the traditional rights court. Trial is by judge or jury. Jurisdiction of the traditional rights court is limited to cases involving titles, land rights, or other disputes arising from customary law and traditional practice.

== See also ==
- Elections in the Marshall Islands
- List of presidents of the Marshall Islands
- Marshall Islands and the United Nations
