= Atama Zedkaia =

Marshallese paramount chief, or Leroijlaplap, of Majuro (1931-2010)

Leroij Atama Zedkaia (1931 – November 19, 2010) was the Marshallese paramount chief, or Leroijlaplap, of Majuro. Leroij Zedkaia spearheaded the movement to break the Marshall Islands away from the rest of the Trust Territory of the Pacific Islands and form the independent Republic of the Marshall Islands. She was also the mother of Jurelang Zedkaia, who has served as the President of the Marshall Islands from 2009 to 2012. Leroij is a title by a female paramount chief, or Leroijlaplap, in the Marshall Islands.

Zedkaia was considered a key figure in the Marshallese independence movement. She worked to break the Marshall Islands away from the rest of Micronesia, which was incorporated into the Trust Territory of the Pacific Islands at the time. According to journalist Giff Johnson, "From a traditional leader point of view, she was very active in the background in supporting the move that was being led by the political leadership here that ultimately was successful in rejecting a Micronesia wide constitution and then developing the Marshall Islands constitution in 1979 which is the foundation for government here ever since."

Atama Zedkaia died on November 19, 2010, at the age of 79. President Jurelang Zedkaia's Minister in Assistance Ruben Zackhras declared a week of national mourning following her death. Marshallese flags were ordered to be flown at half mast until November 28, 2010.

She was accorded a state funeral in Majuro, which is customary for Marshallese traditional leaders. Zedkaia's state funeral ceremony was the largest in the Marshall Islands since the death of former President Amata Kabua in 1996. Approximately 1,000 family and friends of Zedkaia, who were each dressed in black, took part in the state funeral procession. The participants marched behind a hearse and a Marshallese police honor guard. Zedkaia's remains were taken from Majuro Hospital to the Nitijela, or parliament building, for her state funeral, which was broadcast on national television.

The remains of Atama Zedkaia were taken to the Assembly of God Church in Majuro for the funeral services following the end of the official state funeral.

Her son, President Jurelang Zedkaia, assumed the title of paramount chief for all lands governed by Atama Zedkaia following her death. He had previously carried out chiefly duties for her during her life.
