= Sovereign Currency Act of 2018 =

Marshallese legislation

Legislature of the Marshall Islands
- Passed by: Legislature of the Marshall Islands
- Passed: February 26, 2018
- Repealed: August 2025

Sovereign Currency Act of 2018 was a statute of the Legislature of the Marshall Islands which was passed on February 26, 2018. The act created and issued a digital decentralized currency ("cryptocurrency") to be used as a legal tender of the Marshall Islands. The act was repealed in August 2025.

== History ==
SOV
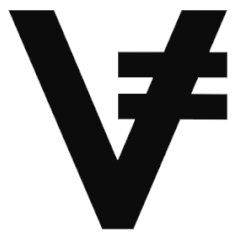

Development
- Initial release: 2018
- Developer: Neema
- License: Ministry of Finance

The Sovereign Currency Act of 2018 was passed on February 26, 2018 by the Legislature of the Marshall Islands. It would create and issue the Sovereign (SOV), a cryptocurrency. The purpose of the act was to lower the dependence on the United States dollar.

The SOV was created through a partnership with Neema, a financial technology startup. Neema uses the "Yokwe" protocol to ensure anonymity while also linking each account with a verified government identity that is both encrypted and private. The SOV is issued by the Ministry of Finance and was introduced through an initial coin offering (ICO). The number of SOV’s in circulation will start at 24 million and will grow by 4% each year. Hilda C. Heine, the President of the Marshall Islands, called the creation of SOV "another step of manifesting our national liberty".

In September 2018, the International Monetary Fund (IMF) released a report warning the Marshall Islands not to launch its own cryptocurrency. The IMF's primary concerns were that the revenue from the ICO would be smaller than expected and that governance of the SOV were not adequate.

The act was repealed in August 2025.

== See also ==
- Bitcoin in El Salvador
- Petro (token)
