= Japanese settlement in the Marshall Islands =

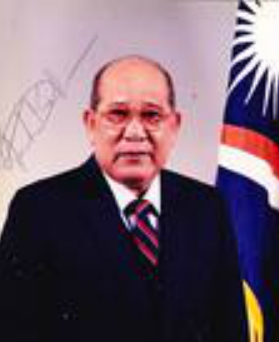
President Amata Kabua

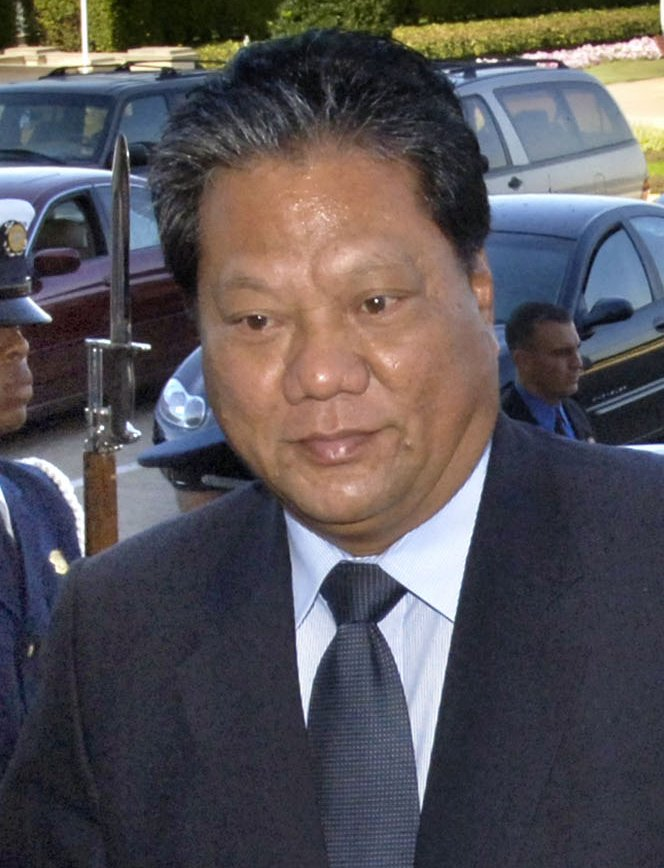
President Kessai Note

Total population
- 70 (2007) (Note: Consists of 50 Japanese nationals through the Marshall Islands; figure excludes Marshall Island citizens of mixed Japanese–Marshallese heritage.)

Regions with significant populations
- Jaluit, Kwajalein

Languages
- Marshallese, English, Japanese

Religion
- Protestantism; Shintoism and Buddhism

Related ethnic groups
- Micronesians, Japanese, Okinawan

Japanese settlement in the Marshall Islands was spurred on by Japanese trade in the Pacific region. The first Japanese explorers arrived in the Marshall Islands in the late 19th century, although permanent settlements were not established until the 1920s. As compared to other Micronesian islands in the South Seas Mandate, there were fewer Japanese who settled in the islands. After the Japanese surrender in 1945, the Japanese populace were repatriated to Japan, although people of mixed Japanese–Marshallese heritage remained behind. They form a sizeable minority in the Marshall Islands' populace, and are well represented in the corporate, public and political sectors in the country.

== History ==
=== Early contact (19th century) ===
The earliest Japanese contact with the Marshall Islands dates back to 1884, when a group of pearl divers were blown off course to Lae Atoll during their return voyage from Australia. The pearl divers were believed to be murdered, after the Ada, a British trading ship sailed past the Marshall Islands and found the skeletal remains of the pearl divers. When news of the purported murder reached the Japanese government, two Japanese envoys–Goto Taketaro (a son of Goto Shojiro) and Suzuki Tsunenori were sent to the Marshall Islands. The envoys reportedly explored some of the nearby atolls before paying a visit to Labon Kabua, one of the principal chief in the Marshall Islands. Before Goto and Suzuki returned for Japan, they induced Kabua to raise the Japanese flag over his house at Ailinglaplap. The Japanese government subsequently ordered the two envoys to return to the island to haul down the flag upon the envoys' return. During the German colonial era, there were occasional reports of Japanese fishermen making landfalls in the atoll, and there was at least one other incident which Japanese fishermen were also killed by the islanders. A report published by a German explorer, Hambruch in 1915 mentioned that three Japanese fishermen in a junk were massacred by the Marshallese at Lae Atoll in 1910.

=== Japanese administration (1914–1944) ===
A military administration was established when Japan annexed the Marshall Islands from Germany in 1914. The Japanese government subsequently dispatched a few administrators to the Marshall Islands. Between 1915 and 1918, a few Japanese businessmen from the South Seas Trading Company (Nanyo Boeki) sailed to the Marshall Islands and established a few trading stations at Rongrong, Talab and Majuro village. A typhoon struck Majuro in 1918 and the businessmen relocated their trading posts to Jaluit. The civilian administration was established at Jabat Island and replaced the military administration in 1922. A small branch government office was established; and local Japanese settlers opened a small copra plantation on the island.

In the early 1920s, a Japanese trader settled in Enewetak and made false claims that he had received permission from the government to develop coconut groves. The natives initially worked for the trader, but resisted after realising the trader's false claims. There was no permanent official at Enewetak and Ujelang, but a ship from Pohnpei would make occasional visits to the islands. Japanese traders avoided Majuro until 1926, although Japanese ships made occasional stops on the atoll. A Japanese sailor settled on Majuro and started a store in 1926, and throughout the 1930s three more independent enterprises sprung up while two trading companies–Nanyo Boeki and Kaneko each established a branch store in Majuro village. The number of Japanese enterprises remained small throughout the Japanese colonial era, as the civilian administration experienced difficulties in acquiring unused land from the Marshallese chiefs. The first Okinawan fishermen arrived in Jaluit in the 1920s, and Jaluit experienced a steady influx of Japanese settlers from Kyushu and Okinawa from 1930s onwards. In the early 1930s, Marshallese reported a strong presence of Japanese and Korean labourers in Jaluit who were hired to build roads and shophouses. The regional headquarters was relocated to Jaluit from Jabat. Jaluit developed into a small town by 1939, and housed a population of several hundred Japanese settlers along with some two thousand Marshallese in the suburban areas.

The Japanese navy developed military bases in the atolls in the early years of World War II. During this time, the military brought in several thousand Japanese, Okinawan and Korean labourers to undertake the construction of military facilities. Some Marshallese and Koreans reported of maltreatment by the Japanese authorities, and there was at least one case of revolt by both groups at Jelbon on Mili Atoll in which a hundred Japanese civilians and soldiers were killed. Some civilians were executed by the Japanese, including Australian missionary Carl Heine and his Marshallese son and daughter-in-law. When American troops attacked the Marshall Islands between January and April 1944, Japanese troops evacuated many Japanese settlers and Korean labourers from the atolls. A few were reportedly killed in the ensuing air raids, while others who remained behind were captured as prisoners of war after the Americans captured the atolls, together with some Japanese soldiers.

=== Recent years (1945–present) ===
After the Japanese surrender, the Japanese population on the islands was repatriated back to Japan. (Note: There were a two exceptions to such cases. One Japanese remained briefly behind but he was deported to Hawaii within a few years after the Japanese surrender. Another Korean trader died shortly after the Americans returned, and left behind two young children by a Marshallese woman.) People of mixed Japanese–Marshallese heritage generally stayed behind, although a few were granted an option if they were above 16 years old. The Japanese–Marshallese quickly assimilated with the Marshallese in the years after the war. Many of them became politicians and businessmen, and in the 1970s people of mixed Japanese–Marshallese heritage controlled most of the private enterprises in the state. Japanese–Marshallese politicians generally held critical opinions on nuclear weapon tests carried out by the United States in Operation Crossroads. At least one ethnologist, Greg Dvorak suggested that the shared Japanese and Marshallese experience of nuclear warfare shaped critical views held by Japanese–Marshallese politicians. From the 1990s onwards, Japanese–Marshallese politicians including James Matayoshi and Hiroshi Yamamura often led lobbies against the United States for monetary compensation of victims of radioactive fallout.

When Marshall Islands became independent in 1986, second and third-generation Japanese–Marshallese offspring formed the Japanese–Marshallese association (also known as Marshall Nikkeijin Kai in Japanese), and rendered assistance to families of Japanese soldiers who died during the Pacific War. Although the association had limited patronage from the younger generation of Japanese–Marshallese, it played an important role in lobbying the government to forge closer cultural and economic ties with Japan. Japanese firms that were based on the Marshall Islands since the 1960s actively sought joint ventures with local companies from the 1980s onwards, mainly in the fishery sector. Expatriates usually consisted of Okinawan fishermen based at Majuro, where Japanese companies have built smoking and canning facilities to facilitate the processing of tuna catches.

== Demographics ==
=== Population ===
The Marshall Islands remained sparsely populated by Japanese settlers, relative to the other mandated Micronesian islands. The first pre-war census of the Marshall Islands counted 490 Japanese among 10,000 Marshallese, and the number of Japanese settlers increased to 680 scattered across all 33 atolls in 1940. Within the same year, the mandated islands had a total Japanese population of 77,000. The largest towns in the Marshall Islands, Jaluit and Jabor, had a thousand Japanese each, while in the most isolated atolls, the Japanese populace amounted to no more than a few individuals. Korean labourers were also counted recognised as Japanese in official statistics, and accounted for another 1,200 individuals which were brought into the Marshall Islands during the war. There was a sizeable minority of people of mixed Japanese and Marshallese heritage, which was more common in settlements with a smaller Japanese populace. In official census, people of mixed Japanese–Marshallese heritage are identified by their Marshallese heritage from 1945 onwards. The Marshallese ambassador to the United States, Banny de Brum cited in 2006 that some 6,000 individuals, or about 10% of all Marshall Islanders had some Japanese ancestry. (Note: See also: 1973 census of Marshall Islands (p. 24). Especially in Majuro, census results reflects a sizeable number (about 3,000) islanders of part-Japanese ancestry.)

=== Language ===
Japanese was extensively used for day-to-day communication during the colonial era by both Japanese and Marshallese, but was replaced by Marshallese after the Japanese surrender. Japanese is still preferred as a second language over English among those of mixed Japanese–Marshallese heritage, and islanders occasionally adopt Japanese loanwords for certain terms in the Marshallese language.

=== Religion ===
At least one Shinto shrine or Buddhist temple was found in each settlement with a sizeable Japanese populace. In Jaluit, Wotje, Kwajalein, Enewetak and Maloelap, several Shinto shrines were built during the 1930s. The State Shinto shrine on Jaluit was reportedly the easternmost shrine in the Japanese Empire. When the Americans invaded the Marshall Islands in 1944, all the existing Shinto shrines were either destroyed in air raids, or were demolished. People of mixed Japanese–Marshallese heritage subsequently adopted Christianity in favour of Buddhism or Shinto after the Japanese surrender.

== Interethnic relations in society ==
As compared to other Micronesian islands, most Marshallese adopted Japanese customs within the first few years of the Japanese administration. An Australian journalist travelling on a Burns Philp steamer noted that the most Marshallese women wore the kimono instead of the traditional loincloth (lavalava in Marshallese) in October 1918. Interethnic relations between the Japanese settlers and civil servants with the Marshallese were friendly, but racial segregation was enforced between Japanese and Micronesians in the workforce and educational sectors. As compared to Micronesians from other islands, Marshallese generally retained more aspects of their traditional lifestyles, relative to the small Japanese populace in the islands. Contrary to Japanese settlements in the other mandated islands, settlers consisted mainly of single men, and intermarriages with Marshallese women were much more frequent. Japanese songs such as Masaharu Gunto were written in the 1930s and reflected of romantic associations between Japanese men and Marshallese women. Ethnic suspicion and hatred by the Marshallese against the Japanese settlers developed during the Second World War, as the Japanese civilian government placed increased emphasis on militarism and forcibly conscripted many Marshallese to menial labour during the Second World War. Shortly before the end of the war, a few Marshallese led independent and isolated attacks against Japanese military personnel wherever possible.

== Notable individuals ==
- Amata Kabua, former President and schoolteacher
- Kunio Lemari, former politician and President
- James Matayoshi, mayor
- Kessai Note, former President

== Bibliography ==
- Christiansen, Henrik, World War Two Artifacts in the Republic of the Marshall Islands: Volume 4 of World War Two Artifacts in the Republic of the Marshall Islands, Republic of the Marshall Islands, Ministry of Internal Affairs, Historic Preservation Office, 1994
- Connell, John; Lea, John P., Urbanisation in the Island Pacific: Towards Sustainable Development–Volume 3 of Routledge Pacific Rim Geographies, Routledge, 2002, ISBN 0-415-24670-9
- Crocombe, R. G., Asia in the Pacific Islands: Replacing the West, 2007, ISBN 982-02-0388-0
- Devaney, Dennis M.; Reese, Ernst S.; Burch, Beatrice L., The Natural History of Enewetak Atoll, U.S. Department of energy, 1987, ISBN 0-87079-579-1
- Doulman, David J., Options for U.S. Fisheries Investment in the Pacific Islands region–Issue 8 of Research Report Series, Pacific Islands Development Program, East-West Center, 1987
- Hezel, Francis X., Strangers in Their Own Land: A Century of Colonial Rule in the Caroline and Marshall Islands (Issue 13 of Pacific Islands Monograph Ser. 13), University of Hawaii Press, 2003, ISBN 0-8248-2804-6
- Hiery, Hermann, The Neglected War: The German South Pacific and The Influence of World War I, University of Hawaii Press, 1995, ISBN 0-8248-1668-4
- Komai, Hiroshi, Foreign Migrants in Contemporary Japan: Japanese Society series, Trans Pacific Press, 2001, ISBN 1-876843-06-3
- McMurray, Christine; Smith, Roy Hugh, Diseases of Globalization: Socioeconomic Transitions and Health, Earthscan, 2001, ISBN 1-85383-711-3
- Peattie, Mark R., Nanʻyō: The rise and fall of the Japanese in Micronesia, 1885–1945, University of Hawaii Press, 1988, ISBN 0-8248-1480-0
- Pacific Islands Monthly: PIM., Volume 68, Pacific Publications, 1998
- Petrosian-Husa, Carmen, Traditional Marshallese Tools: Alele Report, Republic of the Marshall Islands Historic Preservation Office, 2004
- Porter, Tim; Nakano, Ann, Broken Canoe: Conversations and Observations in Micronesia, University of Queensland Press, 1983, ISBN 0-7022-1684-4
- Poyer, Lin; Falgout, Suzanne; Carucci, Laurence Marshall, The Typhoon of War: Micronesian Experiences of the Pacific War, University of Hawaii Press, 2001, ISBN 0-8248-2168-8
- Poyer, Lin; Falgout, Suzanne; Carucci, Laurence Marshall, Memories of War: Micronesians in the Pacific War, University of Hawaii Press, 2008, ISBN 0-8248-3130-6
- Rottman, Gordon L., The Marshall Islands 1944: Operation Flintlock, the Capture of Kwajalein and Eniwetok–Volume 146 of Campaign Series, Osprey Publishing, 2004, ISBN 1-84176-851-0
- Spoehr, Alexander, Majuro: A Village in the Marshall Islands, Chicago Natural History Museum, 1949
- Tobin, Jack A., Stories from the Marshall Islands: Bwebwenato Jān Aelōn̄ Kein, University of Hawaii Press, 2002, ISBN 0-8248-2019-3
- Trumbull, Robert, Paradise in Trust: A Report on Americans in Micronesia, 1946–1958, W. Sloane Associates, 1959
