= Minister of Foreign Affairs (Marshall Islands) =

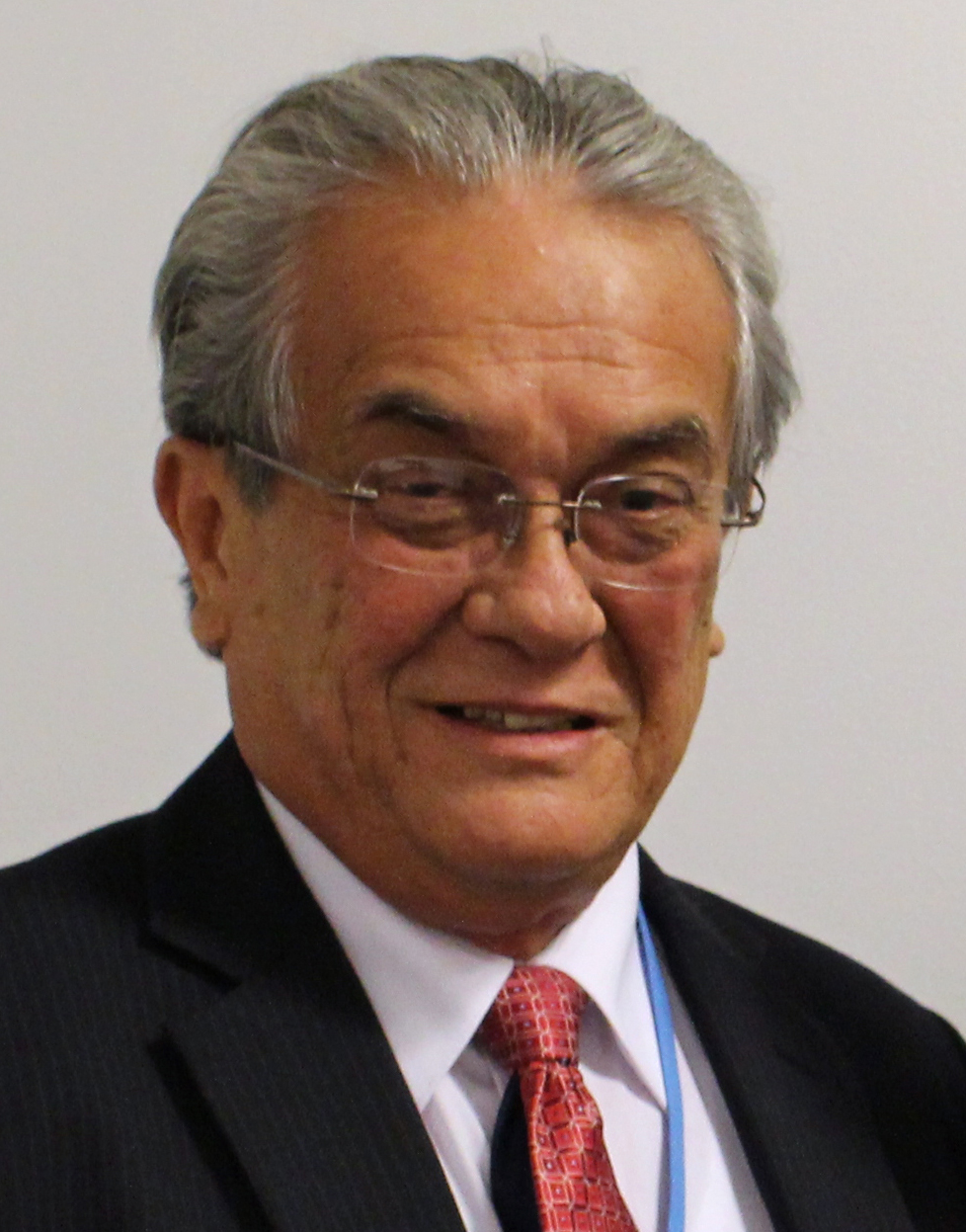
Tony deBrum, the first and longest-serving Minister of Foreign Affairs of the Marshall Islands

This is a list of foreign ministers of the Marshall Islands.

- 1979–1987: Tony deBrum
- 1987–1988: Charles Domnick
- 1988–1994: Tom Kijiner
- 1994–2000: Phillip H. Muller
- 2000–2001: Alvin Jacklick
- 2001–2008: Gerald Zackios
- 2008–2009: Tony deBrum
- 2009–2012: John Silk
- 2012–2014: Phillip H. Muller
- 2014–2016: Tony deBrum
- 2016: Kessai Note
- 2016–2020: John Silk
- 2020–2022: Casten Nemra
- 2022–2023: Kitlang Kabua
- 2023–2024: Jack Ading
- 2024–present: Kalani Kaneko

== Sources ==
- Rulers.org – Foreign ministers L–R
