= Ministry of Justice (Marshall Islands) =

Government ministry

Ministry of Justice, Immigration and Labor

Agency overview
- Jurisdiction: Government of the Marshall Islands

The Ministry of Justice, Immigration and Labor of the Marshall Islands is a ministry of the government of the Marshall Islands. The role of the ministry is to promote the safety of its citizens, oversee the administration of the Attorney General, prosecute criminal cases, defend the federal government from any civil suits and oversee, incorporate and charter approved corporations.

In 2017, the ministry's name was changed from the Ministry of Justice to its current name.

== List of ministers ==
- Ruben Zackhras (1984-1985)
- Kunio Lemari (1985-1987)
- Christopher Loeak (1988-1992)
- Luckner Abner (1993-1997)
- Lomes McKay (1997-1998)
- Hemos Jack (1999)
- Witten Philippo (2000-2004)
- Donald Capelle (2004-2006)
- Witten Philippo (2006-2008)
- David Kramer (2008-2009)
- Brenson Wase (2009-2011)
- Thomas Heine (2012-2015)
- Rien Morris (2015-2016)
- Atbi Riklon (2016)
- Thomas Heine (2016-2017)
- Mike Halferty (2017-2018)
- Jack Ading (2018–2020?)
- Kessai Note (2020-2022)
- Jack Ading (2022–2023)
- Wisely Zackhras (2024–present)

== See also ==
- Justice ministry
- Politics of the Marshall Islands
