= List of presidents of the Marshall Islands =

President of the Marshall Islands
- Būreejtōn in M̧ajeļ (Marshallese)
- Seal of Government of the Republic of the Marshall Islands

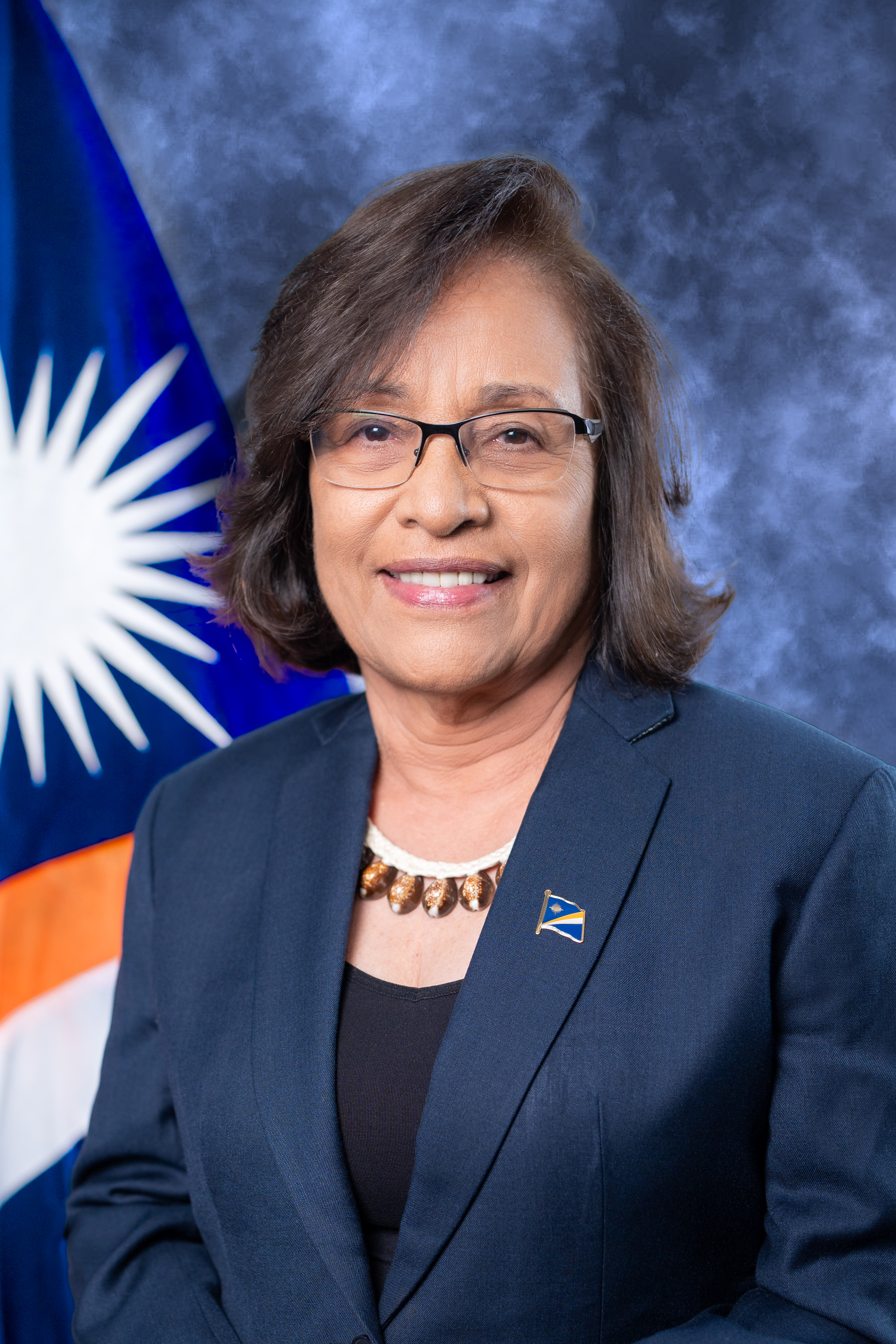
- Incumbent; Hilda Heine since 3 January 2024
- Term length: Four years, renewable once
- Constituting instrument: Constitution of the Marshall Islands
- Inaugural holder: Amata Kabua
- Formation: 17 November 1979; 46 years ago
- Deputy: Minister in Assistance to the President of Marshall Islands
- Salary: US$60,000 annually

The president of the Republic of the Marshall Islands is the head of state and head of government of the Marshall Islands. The President is elected by the Nitijela (Legislature) from among its members. The President pick cabinet members from the Nitijela.

Amata Kabua was elected as the first President of the Republic in 1979. Subsequently, he was re-elected to four-year terms in 1983, 1987, 1991, and 1996. After Amata Kabua's death in office, his first cousin, Imata Kabua, won a special election in 1997. Casten Nemra, who was elected and took office in January 2016, was replaced by Hilda Heine one week later. The Marshallese president, David Kabua, is the son of Amata Kabua. The current Marshallese president is Hilda Heine.

== List of officeholders ==
Status

Denotes acting president

Symbols

^{†} Died in office

No.	Portrait	Name (Birth–Death)	Election	Term of office			Political party
No.	Portrait	Name (Birth–Death)	Election	Took office	Left office	Time in office	Political party
1		Amata Kabua (1928–1996)	1979; 1983; 1987; 1991; 1995	17 November 1979	20 December 1996^{[†]}	17 years, 33 days	Independent
—		Kunio Lemari (1942–2008); Acting	—	20 December 1996	14 January 1997	25 days	United Democratic Party
2		Imata Kabua (1943–2019)	—	14 January 1997	10 January 2000	2 years, 361 days	Aelon̄ Kein Ad
3		Kessai Note (born 1950)	1999; 2003	10 January 2000	14 January 2008	8 years, 4 days	United Democratic Party
4		Litokwa Tomeing (1939–2020)	2007	14 January 2008	21 October 2009 (vote of no confidence)	1 year, 280 days	United People's Party
—		Ruben Zackhras (1947–2018); Acting	—	21 October 2009	2 November 2009	12 days	United Democratic Party
5		Jurelang Zedkaia (1950–2015)	2009	2 November 2009	10 January 2012	2 years, 69 days	Independent
6		Christopher Loeak (1952–2025)	2011	10 January 2012	11 January 2016	4 years, 1 day	Independent
7		Casten Nemra (born 1971)	—	11 January 2016	28 January 2016 (vote of no confidence)	17 days	Independent
8		Hilda Heine (born 1951)	2015	28 January 2016	13 January 2020	3 years, 350 days	Independent
9		David Kabua (1951–2026)	2019	13 January 2020	3 January 2024	3 years, 355 days	Aelon̄ Kein Ad
10		Hilda Heine (born 1951)	2023	3 January 2024	Incumbent	2 years, 267 days	Independent

== See also ==
- Government of the Marshall Islands
- Minister in Assistance to the President of Marshall Islands
- High Commissioner of the Trust Territory of the Pacific Islands
- List of colonial governors of the Marshall Islands
