= Alfred Alfred Jr. =

Marshallese politician

Honorable Alfred Alfred Jr.

Minister of Finance of the Marshall Islands
- In office January 2020 – October 2021
- President: David Kabua
- Preceded by: Jack Ading
- Succeeded by: Brenson Wase

Senator for Ailinglaplap Atoll in Nitijela
- In office 2015–2023

Personal details
- Party: Kien Eo Am (KEA)

Alfred Alfred Jr. is a Marshallese politician serving Ailinglaplap Atoll in Nitijela. He was elected in the 2015 election.

Alfred was Minister of Finance of the Marshall Islands from January 2020 to October 2021 in the cabinet of David Kabua.

He used to be the chairman of Marshall Islands Development Bank.
