= Corruption in the Marshall Islands =

The extent of corruption in the Marshall Islands is evident in how it affects governance, public procurement, and electoral integrity. The Marshall Islands struggles to enforce anti-corruption measures due to limited institutional capacity and political influence. Transparency International’s Global Corruption Barometer has highlighted concerns about bribery and favoritism in government operations, particularly in allocating public contracts and foreign aid. The lack of independent oversight mechanisms has allowed corrupt practices to persist, undermining public trust in government institutions.

== Electoral corruption and bribery ==
Electoral corruption is also a major concern in Marshall Islands, with reports of vote-buying and bribery during elections. A Transparency International study found that election bribery and "sextortion" were rampant in the country, with politicians frequently engaging in corrupt practices to secure votes. The study revealed that 59% of respondents viewed government corruption, including bribery during the electoral campaign, as a significant problem, highlighting widespread concerns about the integrity of the electoral process.

It is noted that there could be a cultural aspect to bribery and corruption in Marshall Islands, where “gift-giving” is accepted as a means of social cohesion and recognition of kin and wider social ties. For this reason, nepotism in public service and gift-giving during elections may be considered as corrupt practices but the case is seen differently in an indigenous setting. This is demonstrated in a Transparency International study, which reported that in 2021, “of the 94 percent of respondents who had engaged over the past year with any of the six select government institutions and services, 63 percent said they had had to pay a bribe, give a gift or do a favor in order to get the needed assistance or services.”

== Public procurement ==
Public procurement has been another area affected by corruption, with allegations of favoritism and mismanagement of funds. The U.S. Department of State has reported credible instances of serious government corruption, including irregularities in the allocation of public contracts. The absence of stringent financial oversight has allowed officials to manipulate procurement processes, leading to inflated costs and inefficiencies. Strengthening transparency in procurement and ensuring independent audits are crucial steps toward addressing these issues.

In 2023, former Health Secretary Jack Niedenthal, revealed that the national government turns a blind eye to the blatant corruption involving politicians. He was reportedly dismissed after requesting an audit from the U.S. Department of the Interior regarding two trust funds—totaling nearly $100 million—intended for healthcare improvements in Kili, Bikini, and Ejit islands. Niedenthal claimed that these funds had been misappropriated, raising concerns about financial transparency and accountability in the government's management of public resources. Officials implicated include Anderson Jibas, the mayor of the council that oversees displaced Bikini community. He has made a series of questionable purchases in behalf of Bikini and had also acknowledged using the trust fund money for personal expenses. In February 2026, Jibas was barred from entering the U.S. due to corruption allegations.

== Notable cases ==
=== Rongelap Atoll scandal ===
One of the notable corruption cases in the Marshall Islands involved Chinese couple Cary Yan and Gina Zhou, who led a multi-year scheme to bribe government officials in the Pacific Island country to pass legislation favoring their business interests. In 2016, the couple, who were naturalized Marshallese citizens, sought to develop a semi-autonomous region within Rongelap Atoll dubbed as Rongelap Atoll Special Administrative Region (RASAR), a semi-autonomous zone with relaxed taxation and immigration laws. The zone would have expanded foreign access to Marshall Islands, which was under American administration until 1979.

Yan and Zhou offered cash bribes and incentives to legislators to support the proposed bill. Despite initial failures, they continued their bribery efforts, and in 2020, the legislature passed a resolution endorsing their plan, with the support of officials who had received bribes. A BBC report stated that lawmakers received bribes ranging from $7,000 to $22,000. In 2023, the U.S. State Department blacklisted former president Kessai Note and Senator Mark Halferty, then incumbent senator, for their involvement in the aborted anomalous project. During the U.S. indictment of Yan and Zhou, at least six members of the Marshallese parliament were also implicated.

The Rongelap affair is part of increasing foreign interference in the Marshall Islands, particularly from Chinese and Taiwanese actors. As early as 2005, for example, the Marshall Islands Journal reported that government officials were already accepting pay-offs from Chinese sources, who aimed to re-establish Marshall Islands’ relations with China. The report alleged that several elected members of the United Democratic Party began receiving bribes beginning December 2005. Senators and Cabinet ministers were implicated in exchange for endorsements of a return to diplomatic ties with China.

== Anti-corruption initiatives ==
Marshall Islands has made efforts to combat corruption through legislative reforms and international cooperation. One key effort has been the adoption on November 11, 2011, of the United Nations Convention against Corruption (UNCAC), which provides a framework for strengthening legal and institutional measures to combat corruption. The government has also worked with international organizations, such as the United Nations Pacific Regional Anti-Corruption (UN-PRAC) Project, to enhance anti-corruption policies and promote ethical governance. Despite these efforts, challenges remain, particularly in enforcing anti-corruption measures and ensuring compliance with international standards.
