= Jack Ading =

Marshallese politician

Jack J. Ading
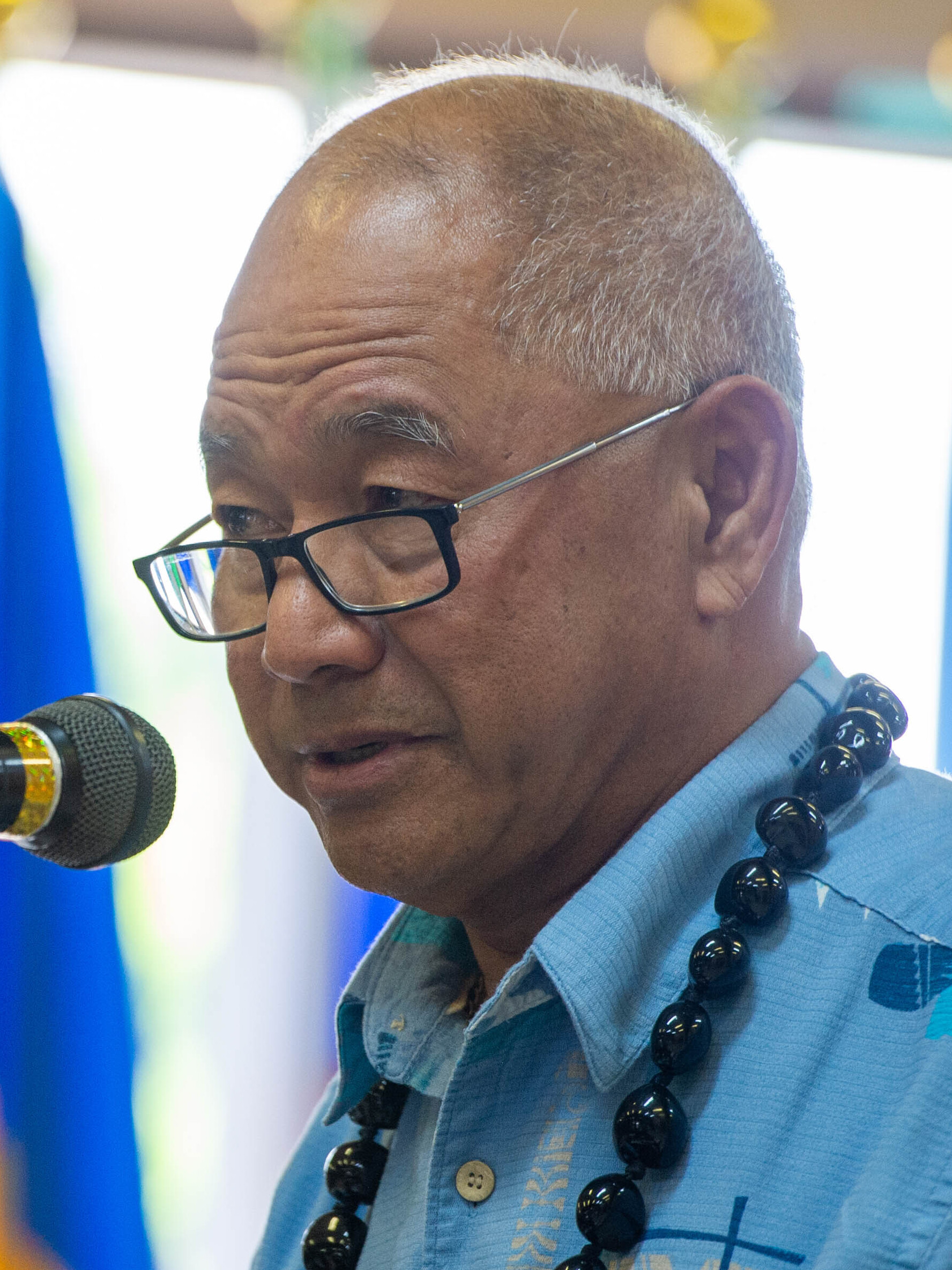
- Ading in 2023

Minister of Finance
- In office 2014 – 1 February 2016
- President: Christopher Loeak; Casten Nemra
- Preceded by: Dennis Momotaro
- Succeeded by: Brenson Wase
- In office 2008–2012
- President: Litokwa Tomeing; Ruben Zackhras; Jurelang Zedkaia
- Preceded by: Brenson Wase
- Succeeded by: Dennis Momotaro

Personal details
- Born: 1 September 1960 (age 66) Ujelang Atoll, Trust Territory of the Pacific Islands
- Spouse: Luren Loeak
- Children: 7
- Education: Hawaii Pacific University

Jack J. Ading (born 1 September 1960 is a Marshallese politician who served as a member of the cabinet, and as a member of Nitijela.

He has a degree in accounting from Hawaii Pacific University.

He worked as an accountant from 1981 to 2006. Since 2007 he has been elected as senator for the constituency of Enewetak and Ujelang Atoll in Nitijela. Ading was the Minister of Finance of the Marshall Islands from 2008 to 2012, and from 2014 to 2016.

He served as the Minister of Justice from 2018 to 2020 and was reappointed in 2022.
