= Constitution of the Marshall Islands =

Supreme law of the Marshall Islands

The Constitution of the Marshall Islands is the supreme law of the Republic of the Marshall Islands, in force from 1 May 1979.

Its text is in both English and Marshallese.

The Constitution was approved on 1 March 1979 by constitutional referendum by 63% of voters.

== History ==
Before the Marshall Islands become an independent state (1986), the Marshallese decided to have their own constitutional law in 1966. In 1976, a Constitutional Convention was organized, with 46 elected members. This Convention drafted the Constitution of 1979, taking into consideration future independence status.

== Structure ==
The Constitution of the Marshall Islands mixes British and American constitutional concepts, based mainly on the Westminster system, with a legislative branch that originates the executive branch, with an independent judicial branch.

The legislature is a bicameral institution, consisting of the Council of Iroij (Traditional High Chiefs) and the elected Nitijeļā (Parliament). The Nitijeļā is the law-making branch of the legislature and consists of 33 elected members, elected for four-year termss. The Nitijeļā also elects from its members the President of the Marshall Islands and, by nomination by the President, other members of the parliament to serve as the Cabinet of the Marshall Islands. The Cabinet is the executive branch and directs the actions of the Government. The Cabinet is then responsible to the Nitijeļā for its executive actions.

The judicial branch consists of the Supreme Court of the Marshall Islands, the High Court of the Marshall Islands, the traditional rights court, district courts, and community courts.
