= 1979 Marshallese constitutional referendum =

Constitutional referendum

| 1 March 1979 |
- Do you approve of the constitution of the Marshall Islands, as adopted by the Marshall Islands Constitutional Convention?

Results
| Choice | Votes | % |
|---|---|---|
| Yes | 5,670 | 63.85% |
| No | 3,210 | 36.15% |

A constitutional referendum was held in the Marshall Islands on 1 March 1979. The new constitution was approved by 63.8% of voters.

== Results ==
| Choice | Votes | % |
|---|---|---|
| For | 5,670 | 63.85 |
| Against | 3,210 | 36.15 |
| Total | 8,880 | 100.00 |
| Registered voters/turnout | 14,385 | – |
Source: Nohlen et al.
