= Maynard Alfred =

Marshallese politician

Honorable Maynard Alfred

Senator for Ailuk Atoll in Nitijela
- Incumbent
- Assumed office 22 November 1999

Personal details
- Party: UDP

Maynard Alfred is a Marshallese politician serving Ailuk Atoll in Nitijela.

He was born on 28 December 1951 in Ailuk. He has worked in banking and finance. He was first elected ato Nitijela in 2007. He was appointed minister of public works in 2009.

He was elected in the 2019 election with 188 votes. The first documented election Alfred won was the 1999 Marshallese general election.
