= Michael Kabua =

Iroijlaplap Michael Kabua
- His Highness; His Excellency
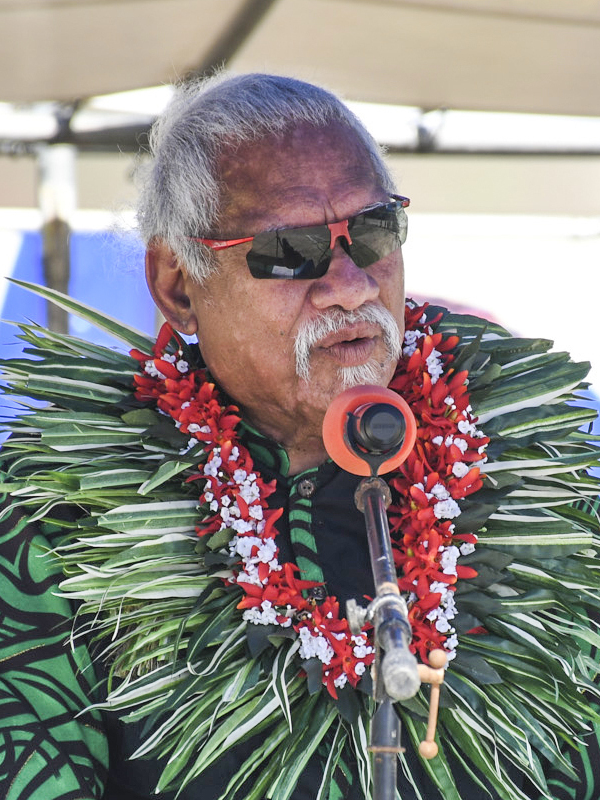
- Kabua in 2021

Iroijlaplap of Kwajalein
- Reign: 2019 - present
- Predecessor: Imata Kabua
- Born: 1945 (age 80–81)

Michael LaMañiñi Kabua is a Marshallese politician who served as a member of the Nitijela from Kwajalein Atoll. In 2022, he was elevated to Iroijlaplap (paramount chief) after the death of Imata Kabua. He chose not to run for reelection in 2023.

In 1996, Kabua was named by two local councils of Lae Atoll or Ujae Atoll as the mayor of the respective atolls.
