= Supreme Court of the Marshall Islands =

Highest court in the Marshall Islands

- Seal of the court
- Location: Marshall Islands
- Composition method: Recommendation of Judicial Service Commission, appointment by the Cabinet, and approval of the Legislature
- Authorised by: Constitution of the Marshall Islands
- Judge term length: Citizens during good behavior up to age 72; noncitizens during good behavior for term of 1 year or more
- Number of positions: 1 chief justice and optional (currently 2) associate justices
- Website: http://rmicourts.org/

Chief Justice
- Currently: Daniel N. Cadra
- Since: 2013
- Lead position ends: 2023

The Supreme Court is the highest court of law in the Republic of the Marshall Islands. It has final authority of all cases brought before it. It consists of a Chief Justice and two associate justices.

The Chief Justice is Daniel N. Cadra. Chief Justices are appointed for ten-year terms.

== Chief Justices ==
Name	Took office	Left office	Notes
Harold W. Burnett	January 1982	June 1988	
Clinton R. Ashford	December 1988	1996	
Allen P. Fields	1997	2003	
Daniel Cadra	September 2003	Incumbent	
