= Kunio Lemari =

Marshallese politician (1942–2008)

His Excellency Kunio Lemari
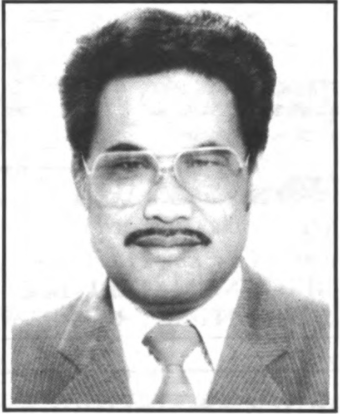

President of the Marshall Islands Acting
- In office 20 December 1996 – 14 January 1997
- Preceded by: Amata Kabua
- Succeeded by: Imata Kabua

Personal details
- Born: 29 November 1942 Jaluit Atoll, South Seas Mandate
- Died: 28 March 2008 (aged 65) Majuro, Marshall Islands
- Party: Aelon̄ Kein Ad; United Democratic Party
- Spouse(s): Helisa A. Kaious (m.1967, div.1985); Christina Lemari (m.1987, until his death in 2008)
- Children: 8

Kunio David Lemari (29 November 1942 – 28 March 2008) was a Marshallese politician. He was the Minister of Justice from 1985 to 1987. He served as the acting President of the Marshall Islands from 20 December 1996 to 14 January 1997. He assumed office upon the death of the previous President, Amata Kabua, having previously served as the country's Minister of Transportation and Communications.

Lemari was of Japanese descent from his maternal grandfather, and was survived by brothers Rellong Lemari (Senator from Lae Atoll) and Johnny Lemari (Mayor of Kwajalein Atoll); wife, Christina Lemari; Imata Kabua; sons Harald (Joanne), Wesley (Lynn), Ranni and Dixon Lemari; daughters Evangeline (Quincy Calep), Dianne, Kimberlynn (Michael Vredenburg), and Lyla; numerous nephews, nieces, grandchildren and great-grandchildren.

On 28 March 2008, Lemari died in Majuro due to complications from diabetes.

Political offices
Preceded by Amata Kabua	Acting President of the Marshall Islands; 1996–1997	Succeeded by Imata Kabua
