= James Matayoshi =

Marshallese politician (born 1968)

Mayor of Rongelap Atoll
- Incumbent
- Assumed office 1995

Personal details
- Born: 1968 (age 57–58) Kwajalein, Marshall Islands
- Parents: Woodrow Matayoshi (father); Almira Ainri (mother)
- Occupation: Politician, activist
- Known for: Advocacy against nuclear weapons

James Matayoshi (born 1968) is the mayor of Rongelap Atoll in the Marshall Islands. He was appointed as Rongelap's mayor in 1995 and has served as chairman of the Marshall Islands Ports Authority since 2008. As the mayor of Rongelap, Matayoshi was noted for his activism on calling for the United States government to render assistance to Marshall Islanders suffering from radiation sickness as a result of a series of nuclear tests carried out under Operation Castle in the 1950s.

== Early life and education ==
Matayoshi was born in Kwajalein. His father, Woodrow Matayoshi, was a second-generation Japanese American from Hawaii, whose parents were immigrants from Okinawa. Matayoshi's mother, Almira Ainri, was a Marshallese from Rongelap and was an activist on issues pertaining to nuclear warfare until her death in June 2005. In her youth, Ainri was exposed to radioactive fallouts from the nuclear bomb tests, which left her with thyroid problems for the rest of her life. Two of Matayoshi's older siblings, Robert and Alex also suffered from thyroid problems as a result of the nuclear bomb tests. Ainri also suffered a miscarriage in 1955 which resulted in a stillborn child without a skeleton. In his youth, Matayoshi was educated in Hawaii, but returned to the Marshall Islands and was elected as Rongelap's mayor in 1995.

== Political career ==
Since his appointment as the Mayor of Rongelap, Matayoshi campaigned vigorously for anti-nuclear causes and often attended memorial events pertaining to nuclear warfare in Japan as well as the Marshall Islands. Between 2005 and 2007, Matayoshi led lobbies against the Nuclear Claims Tribunal to provide monetary compensation to victims of nuclear bomb tests, which were targeted to be used for reconstruction efforts and facilitating resettlement in Rongelap. Japan also provided resettlement funds to Rongelap to 2005, which was motivated in part to Matayoshi's ancestral and diplomatic ties that he established with Japan.

In February 2023, The Washington Post reported that Matayoshi is under investigation by the Marshall Islands' attorney general.
