= Henchi Balos =

Marshallese politician (1946–2000)

Minister of Finance
- In office 1988–1989
- Preceded by: Tom D. Kijiner
- Succeeded by: Ruben Zackhras

Personal details
- Born: 15 July 1946 Bikini Atoll
- Died: 10 September 2000 (aged 54)

Henchi Balos was a Marshallese politician and government minister.

Balos was born on 15 July 1946 in Bikini Atoll. He was among those forced to evacuate from Bikini Atoll in 1946 due to US nuclear testing.

In 1979, Balos was elected to the Nitijela to represent Kili Island and the former residents of Bikini Atoll. He served as the first and only senator representing the Bikini Atoll people until his death. He served in the cabinets of Amata Kabua as Minister of Health, Minister of Resources and Development and Minister of Finance. He was Minister of Finance in the cabinet of Amata Kabua from 1988 to 1989. He often served as acting President of the Marshall Islands when Amata Kabua was abroad.

Balos died on 10 September 2000 in a car accident. He had 12 children.
