= Dennis Momotaro =

Marshallese businessman and government minister (born 1954)

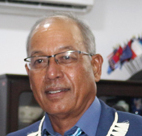
- Momotaro in 2018

Minister of Finance
- In office 2012–2014
- Preceded by: Jack Ading
- Succeeded by: Jack Ading

Personal details
- Born: 26 October 1954 (age 71) Majuro
- Spouse: Senator Daisy Alik-Momotaro
- Education: Rockhurst University, Kansas City

Dennis Momotaro (born 26 October 1954 in Majuro) is a Marshallese businessman and government minister.

He was assistant manager of the Momotaro Corporation from 1980 to 1991, and general manager from 1991 to 2007. By the late 1990s, his status in business in the Marshall Islands saw him elected to numerous organizations, including Board of Director for the National Telecommunication Authority in 1996–1997, chairman to Fisheries Committee to the National Economic and Social Summit in 1997 and Board of Director to the Marshall Islands Development Authority from 1997 to 2003. He has had terms as Minister of Transportation and Communication. He was Minister of Finance from 2012 to 2014.

Since 2007, Momotaro has been an elected member of Nitijela for the constituency of Mejit Island.

Momotaro earned a Bachelor of Arts from Rockhurst University, Kansas City.
