= Jurelang Zedkaia =

President of the Marshall Islands from 2009 to 2012

His Highness His Excellency Iroijlaplap Jurelang Zedkaia
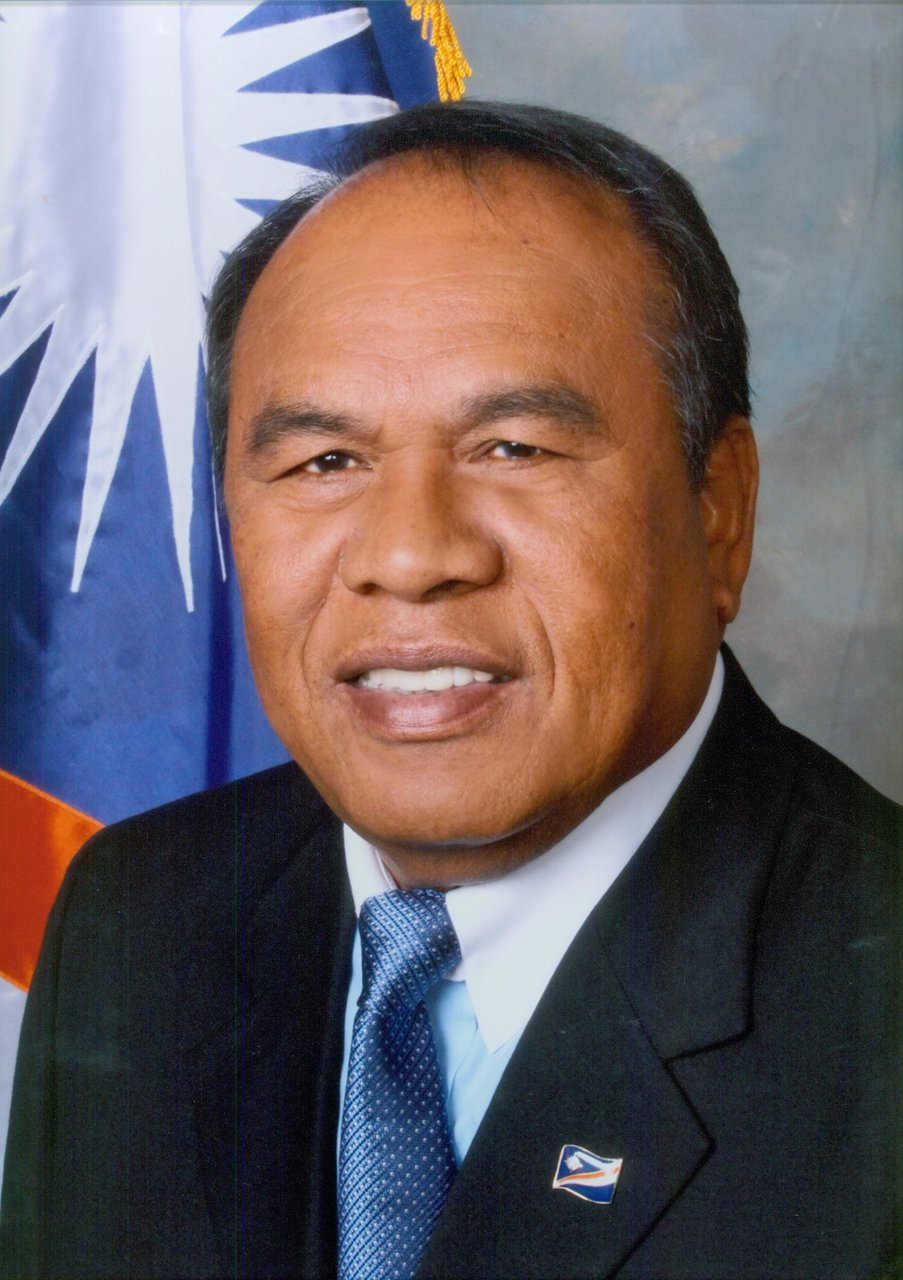
- Zedkaia in 2010

5th President of the Marshall Islands
- In office 2 November 2009 – 10 January 2012
- Preceded by: Ruben Zackhras (Acting)
- Succeeded by: Christopher Loeak

Iroijlaplap of Majuro, Arno and Mili
- In office November 19, 2010 – October 7, 2015
- Preceded by: Atama Zedkaia
- Succeeded by: Lein Zedkaia

Speaker of the Legislature
- In office 2008–2009
- Preceded by: Litokwa Tomeing
- Succeeded by: Alvin Jacklick

Personal details
- Born: 13 July 1950 Majuro Atoll, Trust Territory of the Pacific Islands
- Died: 7 October 2015 (aged 65) Majuro Atoll, Marshall Islands
- Party: Kien Eo Am
- Spouse: Hannah Jurelang Zedkaia

Iroijlaplap Jurelang Zedkaia (13 July 1950 – 7 October 2015) was a Marshallese politician and Iroijlaplap. He served as the President of the Marshall Islands from 2009 to 2012. He was elected as the country's 5th head of state on October 26, 2009, following the ouster of his predecessor, Litokwa Tomeing, in the country's first successful vote of no confidence.

== Biography ==
Zedkaia was the Iroijlaplap, or traditional paramount chief, of Majuro Atoll, which is the location of the country's capital, Arno and Mili atolls. Before becoming president in 2009, Zedkaia was a five-term elected Senator in the Nitijela, or legislature. He became vice speaker of the Nitijela, before becoming the Speaker of the legislature in January 2008. Zedkaia worked in pharmacy for 15 years and 6 years in the Majuro Atoll Local Government. Zedkaia entered the Nitijela in 1981 as representative and senator of Majuro Atoll, a post he served in the duration of his time in the Nitijela.

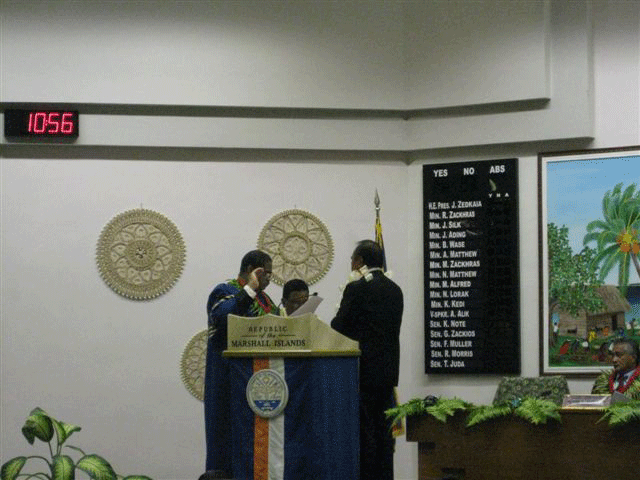
Zedkaia's swearing in as President on Nov. 2, 2009.

=== President of the Marshall Islands ===
Zedkaia's predecessor, Litokwa Tomeing, was defeated in a vote of no confidence on October 21, 2009, in a motion led by former president Kessai Note. The ouster of President Tomeing marked the first successful vote of no confidence in Marshallese history.

A presidential election, the outcome of which was determined by the 33-member Nitijela, took place on October 26, 2009. Speaker Zedkaia and former President Kessai Note were the only candidates for the presidency. Zedkaia was elected as President on October 26, 2009, defeating Note by 17-15, giving Zedkaia the one-vote minimum majority needed to win. He was sworn into office on November 2, 2009.

Zedkaia nominated Alvin Jacklick as the new Speaker, who was confirmed without opposition.

Zedkaia's mother, Leroij Atama Zedkaia, the paramount chief of Majuro Atoll, died on November 19, 2010, at the age of 79. Zedkaia had previously carried out chiefly duties on behalf of his mother during her lifetime. President Zedkaia assumed the chiefly titles for all of the lands on Majuro that had been previously governed by Leroij Atama following her death. He then assumed all chiefly duties in his own name. The state funeral for his mother was the largest to take place in the Marshall Islands since the death of President Amata Kabua in 1996. Zedkaia died in Majuro on 7 October 2015, aged 65.

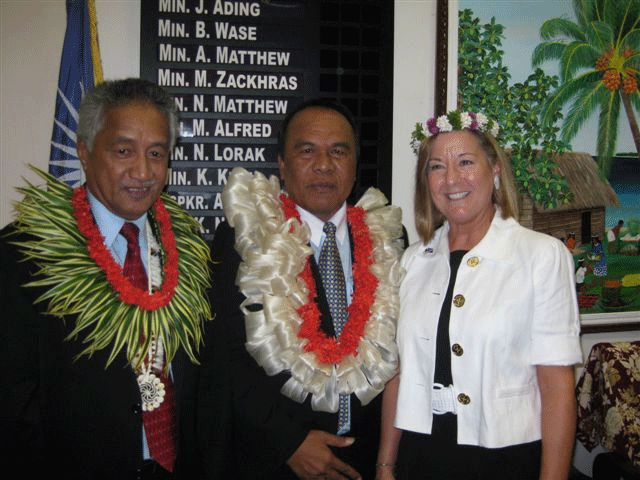
President Zedkaia (middle), flanked by Speaker Alvin Jacklick (L) and U.S. ambassador Martha Campbell.

Political offices
Preceded by Ruben Zackhras; Acting	President of the Marshall Islands; 2009–2012	Succeeded by Christopher Loeak
Regnal titles
Preceded by Atama Zedkaia	Iroijlaplap of Majuro, Arno; 2010–2015	Succeeded by Lein Zedkaia
