= Brenson Wase =

Marshallese politician (born 1952)

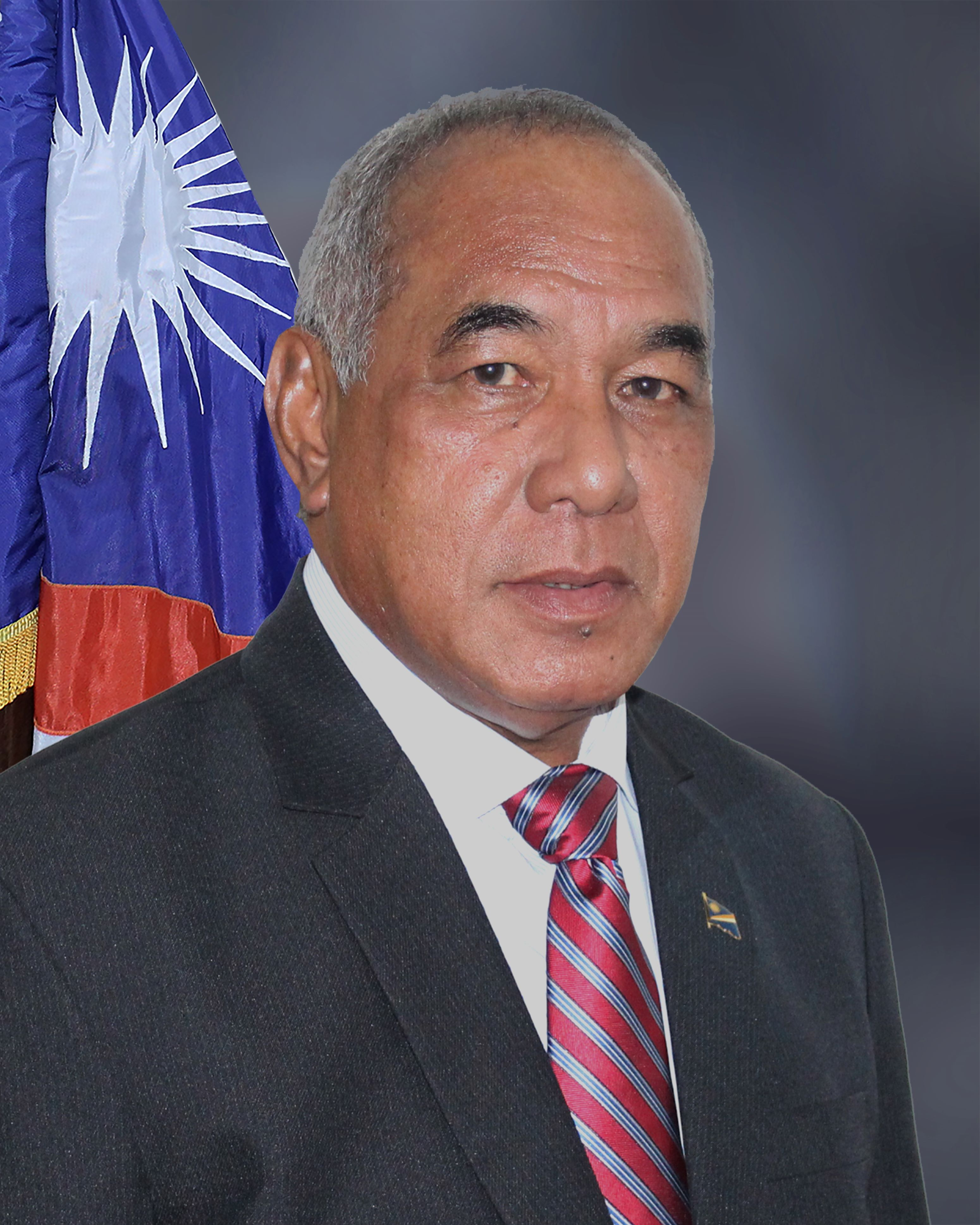
- Wase in 2016

Speaker of the Legislature of the Marshall Islands
- Incumbent
- Assumed office 3 January 2024
- President: Hilda Heine
- Preceded by: Kenneth Kedi

Minister of Finance
- In office 15 October 2021 – 23 June 2023
- President: David Kabua
- Preceded by: Alfred Alfred Jr.
- Succeeded by: Casten Nemra
- In office 1 February 2016 – January 2020
- President: Hilda Heine
- Preceded by: Jack Ading
- Succeeded by: Alfred Alfred Jr.
- In office 2002–2008
- President: Kessai Note
- Preceded by: Michael Konelios
- Succeeded by: Jack Ading

Personal details
- Born: Brenson S. Wase; 28 May 1952 (age 73); Ine, Arno Atoll, Trust Territory of the Pacific Islands
- Spouse: Antonia U. Wase
- Children: 5
- Education: University of Hawaiʻi at Hilo (BS)

Brenson S. Wase (born 28 May 1952) is a Marshallese politician who has been Speaker of the Legislature of the Marshall Islands since 2024, and a member of the legislature since 1983. He has been the head of the ministries of Social Services, Resources and Development, Interior and Outer Islands Affairs, Internal Affairs, Transportation and Communications, Finance, and Justice between 1984 and 2023.

== Early life and education ==
Brenson S. Wase was born in Ine, Arno Atoll, Trust Territory of the Pacific Islands, on 28 May 1952. He attended the Mizpha High School of Micronesia and the Mid-Pacific Institute. He graduated from the University of Hawaiʻi at Hilo with a bachelor of science degree in business administration.

== Career ==
In the 1983 election Wase won a seat in the Legislature of the Marshall Islands and still serves in the legislature. In 1999, his constituency was transferred from Arno to Majuro. Donald Capelle defeated Wase to become Speaker of the legislature in 2012. Wase defeated Bruce Bilimon to become speaker by a vote of 18 to 15 in 2024. He is the second-longest serving member of the legislature as of 2024.

Wase was Minister of Social Services from 1984 to 1987, Minister of Resources and Development from 1988 to 1991, Minister of Interior and Outer Islands Affairs from 1991 to 1995, Minister of Internal Affairs from 1995 to 1999, and Minister of Transportation and Communications from 2000 to 2002.

Wase was Minister of Finance from 2002 to 2008, and from 15 October 2021 to 23 June 2023. Wase was critical of the European Union for listing the Marshall Islands on its tax haven blacklist.

== Personal life ==
Wase married Antonia U. Wase, with whom he had five children.

== Works cited ==
=== News ===
- "Brenson joins RMI Cabinet". The Marshall Islands Journal. 21 October 2021. Archived from the original on 6 July 2025.
- "Casten takes up Finance". The Marshall Islands Journal. 29 June 2023. Archived from the original on 6 July 2025.
- "Hilda Heine sworn in as President of the Marshall Islands". Radio New Zealand. 3 January 2024. Archived from the original on 6 July 2025.
- "Hilda wins election". The Marshall Islands Journal. 4 January 2024. Archived from the original on 5 January 2024.
- "Loeak elected new Marshall Islands President". Radio New Zealand. 3 January 2012. Archived from the original on 6 July 2025.
- Johnson, Giff (24 February 2023). "Marshall Islands officials upset at EU tax blacklisting". Radio New Zealand. Archived from the original on 6 July 2025.

=== Web ===
- "Honorable Brenson S. Wase". President of the Marshall Islands. Archived from the original on 21 June 2011.
- "Nitijela of the Marshall Islands". Institute of Museum and Library Services. Archived from the original on 6 July 2025.
