= Michael Konelios =

Marshallese politician

Minister of Finance
- In office 2000–2002
- Preceded by: Tony deBrum
- Succeeded by: Brenson Wase

Michael Konelios is a Marshallese politician and government minister. As of 2012, he was the Minister of Resources and Development. Konelios was involved in the negotiation with Taiwan to provide solar-powered streetlights to the Marshall Islands.

He was Minister of Finance in the cabinet of Kessai Note from 2000 to 2002.
