= Abacca Anjain-Maddison =

Marshallese politician and anti-nuclear campaigner

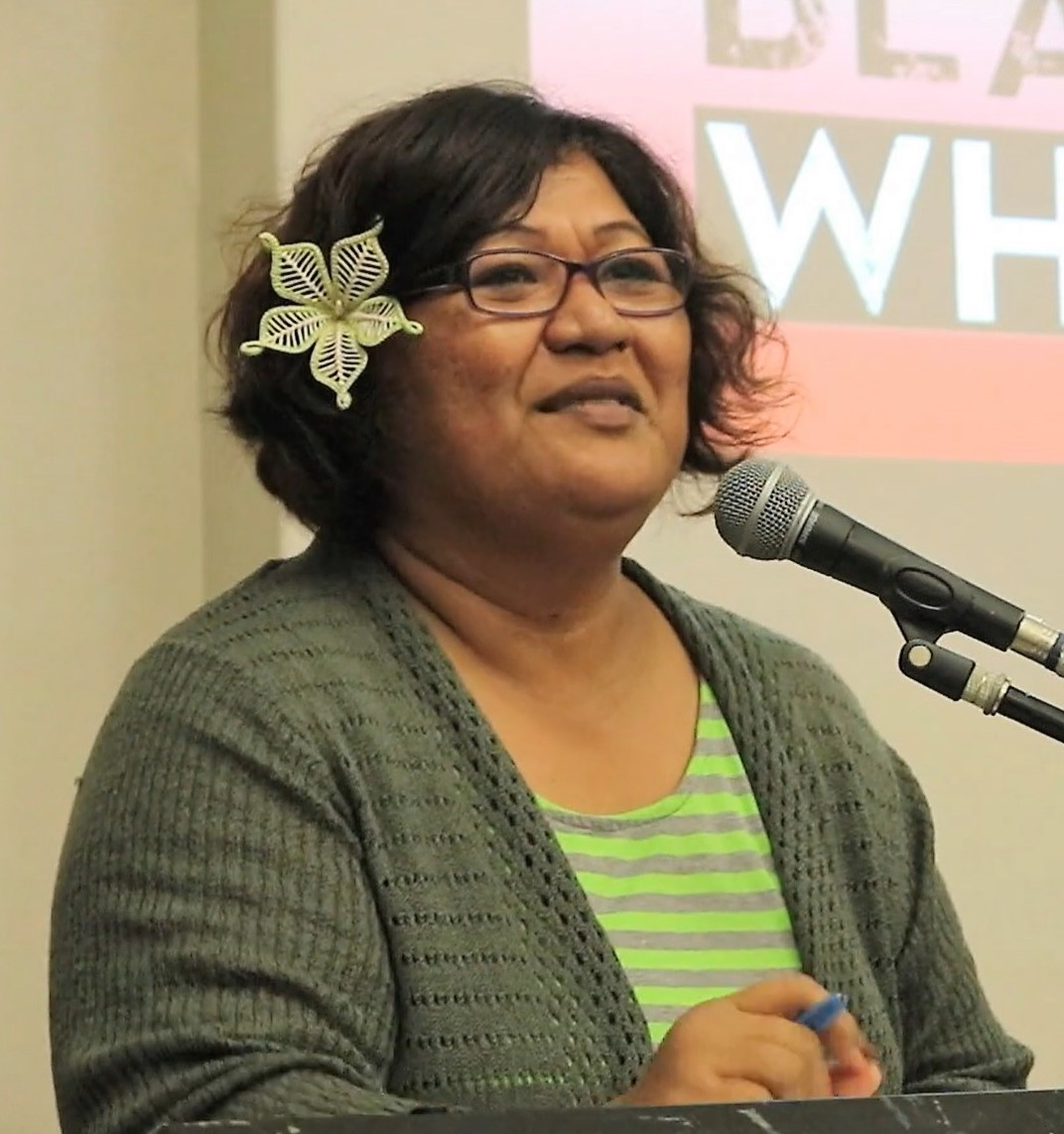
Anjain-Maddison at the Black Mist White Rain Speaking Tour in 2016

Abacca Anjain-Maddison is a former Senator in the Marshall Islands and is now the Deputy Chief Secretary of the country. She is known as a campaigner against nuclear weapons and nuclear testing and in support of greater efforts by the United States to clean up islands it used for nuclear testing.

== Rongelap ==
Abacca Anjain-Maddison was elected to the Marshall Islands senate as a representative of the people of Rongelap Atoll, a coral atoll of 61 islands. Most Rongelapese are now in exile. A total of 67 bombs were exploded in or over what is now the Republic of the Marshall Islands under the U.S. nuclear testing program from 1946 to 1958. Rongelap was particularly devastated by the Castle Bravo test in 1954. According to Anjain-Maddison, the people were used as "guinea pigs".

== Activism ==
Anjain-Maddison was defeated in the 2007 Senate election. Since then she has been appointed Deputy Chief Secretary of the country and has been an active campaigner on behalf of the people of Rongelap and other Marshall Islanders. She supported the filing of claims to the Marshall Islands Nuclear Claims Tribunal, which effectively ran out of funds in 2011 when the USA declined to provide further funding. She has also campaigned for a Rongelap Peace Museum to be established.

In December 2014, Anjain-Maddison spoke at the Vienna Conference on the Humanitarian Impact of Nuclear Weapons. In April 2016, she joined three indigenous Australians on a speaking tour of four Australian cities in four days, called the Black Mist White Rain Speaking Tour, to protest against the ongoing impact of past nuclear testing in Australia and the Pacific. She plays an active role in the International Campaign to Abolish Nuclear Weapons (ICAN), which won the 2017 Nobel Peace Prize. On 7 July 2017 she delivered ICAN's closing address after the Treaty on the Prohibition of Nuclear Weapons was adopted at the United Nations. She is also involved with the international organization "Mayors for Peace".

== Films ==
- Anjain-Maddison appeared in the film, Yokwe Bartowe, as an actress. The film explores the Yokwe spirit of the Marshallese culture and is the story of a young girl who is kidnapped by an evil demon bird. Bartowe is Lijiamao's 20-year-old brother and he was supposed to be watching his sister on the day she mysteriously vanished while swimming in the lagoon. He is blamed for her disappearance.
- She also appeared in two documentaries as herself: The Coming War on China, directed by the Australian filmmaker, John Pilger, and Unnatural Causes: Is Inequality Making us Sick?, a documentary miniseries that explored the impact of the environment on people's health.
