= Rien Morris =

Marshallese politician and government minister

Rien R. Morris (died 2015 or 2016) was a Marshallese politician and government minister. As of 2015 he was Minister of Justice and represented Jaluit Atoll in the Nitijela. In 2013 he was Minister of Transport and Communications.
