= Litokwa Tomeing =

President of the Marshall Islands from 2008 to 2009

His Excellency Litokwa Tomeing
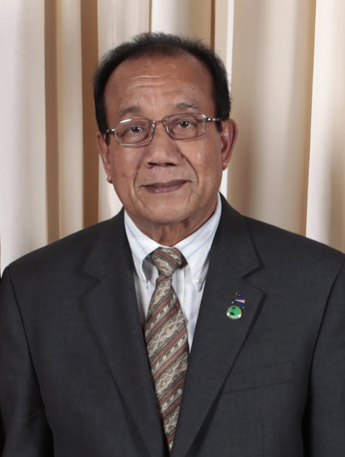
- Tomeing in 2009

4th President of the Marshall Islands
- In office 14 January 2008 – 21 October 2009
- Preceded by: Kessai Note
- Succeeded by: Ruben Zackhras (Acting)

Speaker of the Legislature
- In office 2000–2007
- Preceded by: Kessai Note
- Succeeded by: Jurelang Zedkaia

Personal details
- Born: 14 October 1939 Wotje Atoll, South Seas Mandate
- Died: 12 October 2020 (aged 80) Springdale, Arkansas, U.S.
- Party: UDP (until 2007), UPP (from 2007)
- Spouse: Arlin Tomeing
- Children: 7

Iroij Litokwa Tomeing (14 October 1939 – 12 October 2020) was the President of the Marshall Islands from January 2008 until October 2009.

== Biography ==
=== Early and personal life ===
Litokwa Tomeing was born on Wotje Atoll, in the Japanese-administered Marshall Islands, on October 14, 1939. From 1950 until 1954, Tomeing attended the Catholic Elementary School, first in Likiep and then in Jaluit.

In 1961, Tomeing graduated from PIC High School in Pohnpei. He studied at the University of Hawaiʻi from 1970 until 1972 on an extension program. Tomeing and his wife, Arlin, had seven children and several grandchildren.

Litokwa died on 12 October 2020, in Springdale, Arkansas, United States.

=== Career ===
Tomeing was a traditional chief.

He became a principal and teacher at Ebon Elementary School in 1961, and remained with the school until 1964. He then moved to Majuro, where he taught at Rita Elementary School from 1965 until 1968.

Tomeing was elected the Mayor of Wotje Atoll, his first public office. He remained in office as Mayor of Wotje from 1965 until 1969. He taught at Wotje Elementary School from 1968 until 1973, while continuing to serve as mayor. He moved back to Majuro in 1974, where he was employed at the Marshall Islands High School as the school's Media and Curriculum specialist.

Tomeing campaigned for and won a seat in the Nitijela, representing a constituency which included the Ebon Atoll, Namdrik Atoll, Kili, and Jaluit atolls. He held this seat from 1974 until 1978. In 1976, Tomeing was appointed as one of the Marshallese delegates at the Federated States of Micronesia Constitutional Convention, which was held in Saipan, the Northern Mariana Islands.

In 1978, Tomeing became a delegate and member at large to the Marshall Islands Constitutional Convention, which was held in Majuro.

Tomeing was again elected as one of the 33 members of the Nitijela in 1979, shortly after the political separation of the Marshall Islands from the neighboring Federated States of Micronesia. He has held a seat in the Nitijela continuously since 1979, as of January 2019.

Tomeing served as the Vice Speaker of the Nitijela from 1992 to 1995. He then became a member of the Cabinet as the Minister-in-Assistance to the President from 1996 until 1998. Tomeing held a "supervisory role" over the Ratak Chain as part of his cabinet position.

Tomeing became the Speaker in 2000. He served as Speaker of the Nitijela for eight years before defecting from the governing United Democratic Party (UDP) to the opposition in November 2007, shortly before the November 2007 parliamentary election.

=== Presidency of the Marshall Islands ===
Following the parliamentary election, he was a candidate in the January 2008 presidential election for the UPP/AKA coalition. He was elected president on 7 January 2008 by the Nitijela, receiving 18 votes over 15 for incumbent Kessai Note. He was sworn in, along with a cabinet composed of ten ministers, on 14 January by Carl Ingram, the Chief Justice of the High Court.

His election was believed to herald a shift from the pro-Taiwan policy of Marshall Islands, possibly marking an end to Marshall Islands–Taiwan diplomatic relations. However, in office Tomeing expressed continued support for ties with Taiwan and met with the vice-president of Taiwan, Annette Lu, when she visited the Marshall Islands on 29 January 2008.

President Tomeing inaugurated a consulate in Springdale, Arkansas, on September 28, 2009. The Marshall Islands currently has embassies in Washington, D.C., and New York City. However, its opening marked the first consulate in the continental United States. The Marshallese community living in the Springdale area, who originally came to work for food-processing plants in the 1970s, is the largest population outside of the Marshall Islands. Tomeing's own grandson graduated from Springdale High School in 2008.

Tomeing was removed from office by the Marshall Islands' first successful vote of no confidence on 21 October 2009. Tomeing had survived two previous votes of no confidence. The legislature, which voted 17–15 in favour of the motion, elected a new president on 23 October, Jurelang Zedkaia. The speaker, Jurelang Zedkaia, named Ruben Zackhras as the acting president in the meantime. Zackhras previously served as Tomeing's Minister in Assistance.

Political offices
Preceded by Kessai Note	President of the Marshall Islands; 2008–2009	Succeeded by Ruben Zackhras; Acting
