= Phillip H. Muller =

Marshallese politician and diplomat

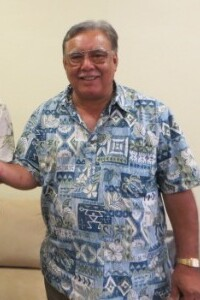
Muller in 2013

Phillip Henry Muller (born January 2, 1956) is a Marshallese politician and diplomat.

From 1982 to 1984, Muller was the Deputy Minister of Foreign Affairs for the Marshall Islands. In 1984, he was elected to the Legislature of the Marshall Islands from the Nitijela constituency. From 1986 to 1994, he was the Minister of Education, and from 1994 to 1999, he was the Minister of Foreign Affairs. In 1999, he left politics.

On 25 June 2008, Muller was appointed the Permanent Representative of the Marshall Islands to the United Nations in New York City.

On 9 January 2012, Muller was appointed Foreign Minister.

Muller is an alumnus of Rockhurst College in Kansas City, Missouri, United States.
