= Tom Kijiner =

Marshallese politician (born 1945)

Tom D. Kijiner
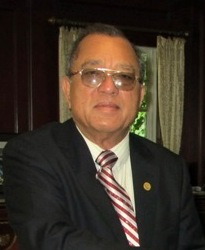
- Kijiner in 2013

Minister of Finance
- In office 1984–1988
- Preceded by: Amata Kabua
- Succeeded by: Henchi Balos

Personal details
- Born: 29 August 1945 (age 80) Likiep Atoll

Tom D. Kijiner (born 29 August 1945) is a Marshallese politician and former government minister.

== Biography ==
Kijiner was born in Likiep Atoll. He studied at the College of Guam and the University of Hawaiʻi. He worked as a teacher and a school principal.

From 1974 to 1979, he served as the representative of Likiep Atoll in the Marshall Islands Congress. He was then continuously elected to Nitijela from 1979 to 2003. He was later appointed to several cabinet positions: Minister of Education from 1979 to 1984, Minister of Finance from 1984 to 1988, Minister of Foreign Affairs from 1988 to 1994 and Minister of Health and Environment from 1994 to 1999. He received diplomatic duties as ambassador-at-large from 2007 to 2009, and in 2012 he was appointed as the ambassador to Japan.
