= Tony deBrum =

Marshallese politician

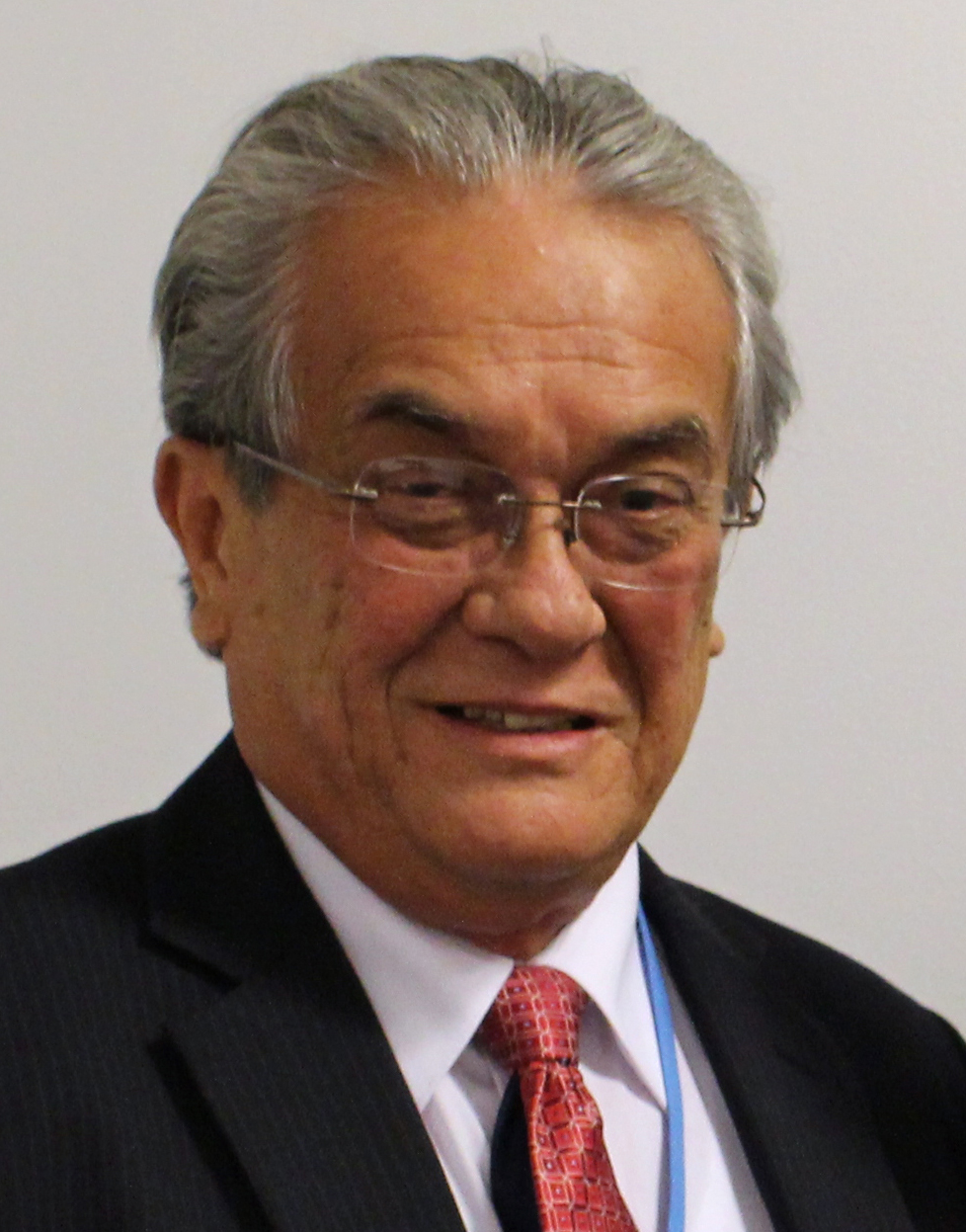
- deBrum in 2013

Minister in Assistance to the President of Marshall Islands
- In office January 2012 – May 2014
- President: Christopher Loeak
- Preceded by: Ruben Zackhras
- Succeeded by: Wilbur Heine

Minister of Finance
- In office 1998–2000
- Preceded by: Ruben Zackhras
- Succeeded by: Michael Konelios

Personal details
- Born: 26 February 1945 Tuvalu
- Died: 22 August 2017 (aged 72) Majuro, Marshall Islands
- Spouse: Rosalie Maddison deBrum
- Children: Doreen Frances deBrum, Dolores deBrum, and Sallyann deBrum
- Occupation: Minister, activist, ambassador
- Awards: Right Livelihood Award
- deBrum's voice deBrum in an interview with Carbon Brief; Recorded May 15, 2015

Tony deBrum (also Anton deBrum) (26 February 1945 – 22 August 2017) was a Marshallese politician and government minister. His cabinet posts included Minister in Assistance to the President of Marshall Islands, Minister of Finance, Minister of Foreign Affairs and Minister of Education.

== Life and career ==
DeBrum was born in Tuvalu as the Pacific War was nearing its conclusion. The family later moved to Likiep Atoll. His father was a manager at Marshall Islands International Airport, while his mother was a teacher.

One formative experience for him as a child was witnessing the fallout from nuclear testing at Bikini Atoll. He witnessed the sky turn "blood red" when out fishing with his grandfather as a nine-year-old boy. For that reason, he was outspoken about the issues of nuclear testing and led a lifelong campaign for nuclear disarmament. In 2014, he filed unsuccessful lawsuits at the International Court of Justice against all nine states that have nuclear weapons, describing the weapons as "a senseless threat to essential survival." He linked the issue to climate change, and declared that it was "repugnant" for any citizens to have to leave their islands due to sea level rise having already had to flee the fallout from nuclear testing.

He attended Chaminade University of Honolulu and then the University of Hawaiʻi, and was one of the first Marshallese to attend university.

He helped organize the Marshall Islands' independence from the United States and later served as Minister of Foreign Affairs from 1979 to 1987, from 2008 to 2009 and from 2014 to 2016. He was the Minister in Assistance to the President of Marshall Islands from 2012 to 2014. He was particularly outspoken on climate change, and participated in numerous conferences and demonstrations, including the People's Climate March in New York City in September 2014.

In mid December 2015, he took part in the 2015 United Nations Climate Change Conference. He succeeded in forming a new coalition between developed countries and developing countries called High Ambition Coalition. The coalition of over 90 countries was credited with galvanising the conference around the goal of holding global temperatures to a 1.5 °C increase. He has been credited as instrumental in securing the Paris Agreement, and its aspirational goal of limiting the rise in temperatures to 1.5 °C.

He was an outspoken proponent for ocean thermal energy conversion technology (OTEC) and tried to get the US and Marshallese governments to agree to build a 20 MW floating OTEC power plant by Kwajalein atoll in the Marshall Islands in association with Energy Harvesting Systems of Honolulu, Hawaii. On Kwajalein the local children nicknamed him "Mr. OTEC".

== Awards ==
DeBrum won the 2015 Right Livelihood Award in recognition of his "vision and courage to take legal action against the nuclear powers for failing to honour their disarmament obligations under the Nuclear Non-Proliferation Treaty and customary international law.".

== Personal life ==
DeBrum is the uncle of Marshallese climate envoy Tina Stege.
