= Aelon̄ Kein Ad =

Political party in the Marshall Islands, western Pacific

Aelon̄ Kein Ad (lit. 'Our Islands', in Marshallese pronounced [ɑelʲɤŋɡeinʲɑːrʲ]), also called the Kabua Party, is a political party in the Marshall Islands, headed by David Kabua. It is a coalition of other parties, including the United People's Party led by former president Litokwa Tomeing. The party is led by traditional chiefs, the Iroij. At the last legislative elections, 17 November 2003, no parties participated, though part of the members could be members of either Aelon̄ Kein Ad or the United Democratic Party.
