= Iroijlaplap =

Marshallese title

Iroijlaplap (Marshallese: iroojļapļap [irˠoːzʲ(e)lˠɑbʲ(ɛ)lˠɑpʲ]; feminine: Leroijlaplap, leroojļapļap [lʲeːrˠoːzʲ(e)lˠɑbʲ(ɛ)lˠɑpʲ]) are the traditional paramount chiefs in the Marshall Islands. Ordinary chiefs bear the title of Iroij (feminine: Leroij); -ļapļap is a superlative suffix.

== Legal basis ==
Article III of the Constitution of the Marshall Islands recognises the title. It establishes a Council of Iroij, composed of holders of the title of Iroijlaplap or other analogous traditional titles, chosen from holders of the chieftainship among the several constituent islands.

The council is empowered to "consider any matter of concern to the Republic of the Marshall Islands, and it may express its opinion thereon to the Cabinet". The council is also entitled to formally request the reconsideration of any bill in the Nitijela, the Legislature of the Marshall Islands, that affects customary law, traditional practices, or land tenure.

== Reigning Iroijlaplap ==
There are several Iroijlaplap; several are listed here:

- Michael Kabua of Kwajalein Atoll
- Remios Hermios of Ratak (excluding Majuro, Arno Atoll and Mili Atoll).
- Lein Zedkaia of Majuro, Arno Atoll, and Mili Atoll.
- Christopher Loeak of Ailinglaplap Atoll.
