= Ruben Zackhras =

Marshallese politician (1947–2018)

His Excellency Ruben Zackhras
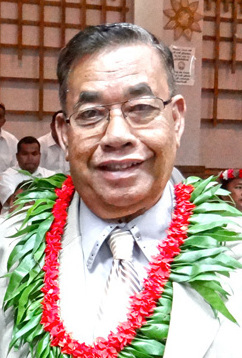
- Zackhras in 2013

President of the Marshall Islands Acting
- In office 21 October 2009 – 2 November 2009
- Preceded by: Litokwa Tomeing
- Succeeded by: Jurelang Zedkaia

Minister in Assistance to the President
- In office September 2009 – January 2012
- President: Litokwa Tomeing; Jurelang Zedkaia
- Preceded by: Christopher Loeak
- Succeeded by: Tony deBrum

Minister of Finance
- In office 1989–1997
- Preceded by: Henchi Balos
- Succeeded by: Tony deBrum

Personal details
- Born: 4 December 1947 Ailinglaplap Atoll, Trust Territory of the Pacific Islands
- Died: 26 December 2018 (aged 71) Hawaii, United States
- Party: UDP
- Spouse: Rothie Zackhras
- Children: 7

Ruben R. Zackhras (4 December 1947 – 26 December 2018) was a Marshallese politician. He was acting President of the Marshall Islands from 21 October 2009 to 26 October 2009. He previously served as Minister of Finance from 1989 to 1997.

Zackhras, graduated from the University of Guam in 1971 holding a BA in Public Administration, served in Marshallese politics for 36 years and in the Nitijela from 1979 to 2015, and served as a representative of Ailinglaplap Atoll. His initial political career was combined with his role as a teacher. He was elected to the Marshallese constitutional convention in 1977. He was appointed Minister of Transportation and Communication in 1979. From 1982 Zackhras was appointed minister of Transportation and Communication, Interior and Outer Island Affairs (1982–1984), Justice (1984–1987) and Health & Environment (1987–1989), until his appointment in 1989 as Minister of Finance. In the year of 2000, Zackhras was elected as deputy speaker of the Nitijela serving until 2007.

Zackhras served as Minister in Assistance to former president Litokwa Tomeing until Tomeing was ousted in the country's first successful vote of no confidence against a sitting president on 21 October 2009. The Speaker of the Nitijela, Jurelang Zedkaia, appointed Zackhras as the acting president of the Marshall Islands until new presidential elections could be held. Zackhras remained acting president until 26 October 2009, when Jurelang Zedkaia was elected as president by the Nitijela. Zackhras was subsequently appointed Minister in Assistance to the President of Jurelang Zedkaia and served until January 2012. He was appointed the ambassador to Fiji by President Hilda Heine, and held that position until his death.

Zackhas died of cancer on 26 December 2018 in Hawaii, United States, aged 71.

He was member of the United Democratic Party. Mattlan Zackhras was his son.

Political offices
Preceded by Litokwa Tomeing	President of the Marshall Islands; Acting; 2009	Succeeded by Jurelang Zedkaia
