= Kessai Note =

President of the Marshall Islands from 2000 to 2008

His Excellency Kessai Hesa Note
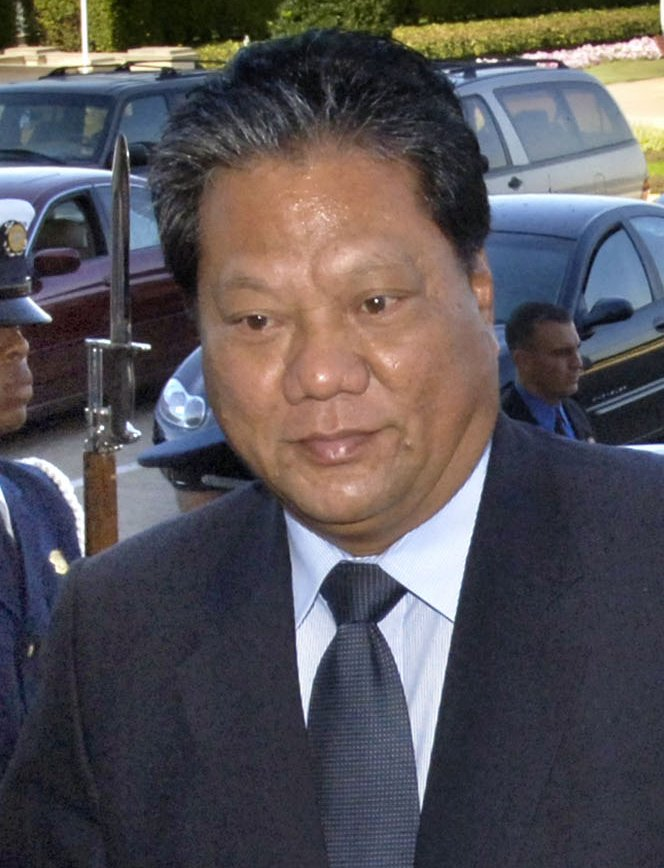
- Note in 2005

3rd President of the Marshall Islands
- In office 10 January 2000 – 14 January 2008
- Preceded by: Imata Kabua
- Succeeded by: Litokwa Tomeing

Speaker of the Nitijela
- In office 1988–1999
- Preceded by: Atlan Anien
- Succeeded by: Litokwa Tomeing

Personal details
- Born: 7 August 1950 (age 76) Ailinglaplap Atoll, Trust Territory of the Pacific Islands
- Party: UDP
- Spouse: Mary Neimoj Yamamura

Kessai Hesa Note (born 7 August 1950, in Ailinglaplap) is a Marshallese politician who was President of the Marshall Islands from 2000 to 2008.

Elected in 1979 alongside Litokwa Tomeing, Note is one of the two longest-serving members of Nitijeļā. He was the Minister of Internal affairs from 1985 to 1986, and Minister of Transportation and communications from 1986 to 1987. Having served as Speaker of the Nitijeļā since 1988, he was elected president in 2000. Note is the first commoner, rather than an Iroijlaplap or traditional chief, to be elected to the Presidency. He is a member of the United Democratic Party, and was reelected by parliament in January 2004, receiving 20 votes, while Justin deBrum received 9.

On 7 January 2008, following the November 2007 general election, he was defeated in his bid for re-election in a vote of Parliament, receiving 15 votes against 18 for Litokwa Tomeing.

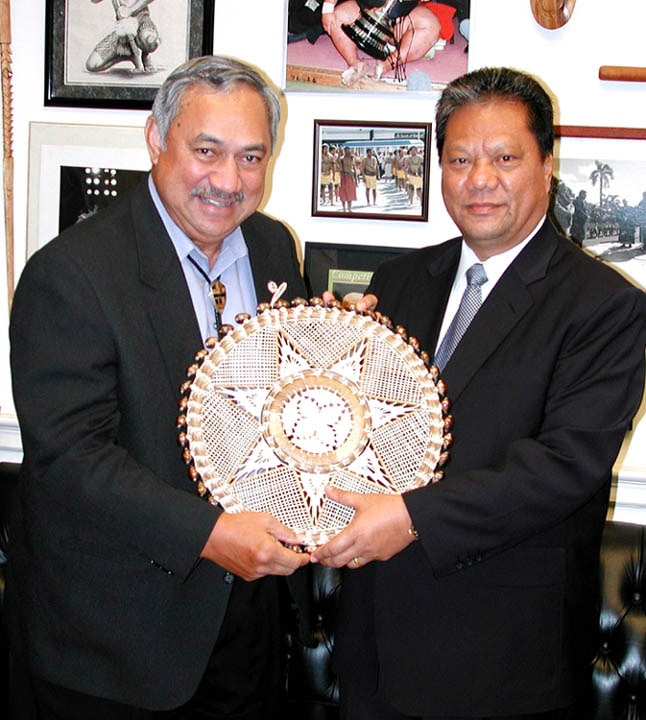
Kessai Note (right) with U.S. Delegate Eni Faleomavaega.

Note is of Japanese-Marshallese descent, having inherited his Japanese heritage from his paternal grandfather. Note's grandfather was a native of Niigata Prefecture, and settled in the Marshall Islands during the Japanese colonial era and married a Marshallese wife.

He was the Minister of Justice from 2020 to 2022.

In February 2023, The Washington Post reported that Note is under investigation by the Marshall Islands' attorney general. In December 2023, the United States Department of State barred Note from entering the US under the Global Magnitsky Act for accepting bribes.

Political offices
Preceded by Imata Kabua	President of the Marshall Islands; 2000–2008	Succeeded by Litokwa Tomeing
