= United Democratic Party (Marshall Islands) =

Political party in the Marshall Islands

The United Democratic Party is a political party in the Marshall Islands. At the last legislative elections, 17 November 2003, no parties participated, though part of the members could be members of either the Kabua Party or the United Democratic Party. The United Democratic Party, while being one of the two most popular unincorporated political parties in the Marshall Islands, alongside the Kabua Coalition, has not had power since 2008, although Ruben Zackhras was an acting president for 12 days in 2009.

== History ==
The United Democratic Party was formed after the independence of the Marshall Islands and gained their first presidency in 1997 for 25 days and later in 2000 for 8 years.
