= 2023 Marshallese general election =

- 20 November 2023

All 33 seats in the Nitijeļā
| | First party |
|---|---|
| Party | Independents |
| Seats won | 33 |
Speaker before election
Kenneth Kedi
Elected
Speaker
Brenson Wase

General elections were held in the Marshall Islands on 20 November 2023.

== Electoral system ==
The 33 members of the Nitijeļā are elected in 19 single-member constituencies via first-past-the-post voting and five multi-member constituencies of between two and five seats via plurality block voting. The President is elected by the Nitijeļā from among its members.

== Results ==
Complete vote tabulation did not begin until 5 December, due to Marshallese law permitting postal ballots postmarked prior to the election to arrive and be counted up to 14 days after election day. On 27 November, preliminary results not including postal ballots indicated substantial turnover in the Nitijeļā with as many as one third of parliamentary seats turning over to new members, including that of speaker Kenneth Kedi.

On 12 December, the RMI Election Administration issued "final unofficial" results, beginning a 14-day period in which the results can be challenged before being declared "final official". Official results were confirmed on 27 December. Incumbent candidates were defeated in 13 of the 33 seats in the Nitijeļā, confirming the loss of speaker Kedi as well as those of Vice Speaker Peterson Jibas and government ministers John Silk and Casten Nemra. Four women were elected, the most ever.

Majuro candidate Yolanda Lodge-Ned filed a recount petition regarding her loss to Stephen Phillip. Lodge-Ned's petition was rejected by Chief Electoral Officer Ben Kiluwe, Kiluwe arguing that the 17-vote loss was a "wide margin".

| Constituency | Candidate | | Notes |
|---|---|---|---|
| Ailinglaplap (2) | Bruce Loeak | 448 | Elected |
| Ailinglaplap (2) | Issac Zackhras | 412 | Elected |
| Ailinglaplap (2) | Alfred Alfred, Jr | 381 | Unseated |
| Ailinglaplap (2) | Rendy Johnny | 258 | |
| Ailinglaplap (2) | Nuia Loeak | 248 | |
| Ailinglaplap (2) | Meuton Laiden | 210 | |
| Ailinglaplap (2) | Francis Horiuchi | 79 | |
| Ailinglaplap (2) | Bandrik Langidrik | 38 | |
| Ailinglaplap (2) | Harold Sam | 32 | |
| Ailinglaplap (2) | Robert Ysawa | 11 | |
| Ailuk (1) | David Kona Anitok | 219 | Elected |
| Ailuk (1) | Bori Ysawa | 125 | |
| Ailuk (1) | Ankit Typhoon | 43 | |
| Arno (2) | Mike Halferty | 671 | Re-elected |
| Arno (2) | Gerald Zackios | 374 | Elected |
| Arno (2) | Stevenson Kotton | 274 | |
| Arno (2) | Hinton Johnson | 253 | |
| Arno (2) | Jejwardrick Anton | 247 | |
| Arno (2) | Arthur Jetton | 196 | |
| Arno (2) | Cecelia Takiah Heine | 92 | |
| Aur (1) | Hilda Heine | 561 | Re-elected |
| Aur (1) | Justin Lani | 340 | |
| Ebon (1) | Marie D. Milne | 381 | Elected |
| Ebon (1) | John Silk | 369 | Unseated |
| Enewetak (1) | Jack Ading | 244 | Re-elected |
| Enewetak (1) | Janifer Alfred | 70 | |
| Enewetak (1) | Maika Leviticus | 39 | |
| Jabat (1) | Kessai Note | 165 | Re-elected |
| Jabat (1) | Whitney Loeak | 120 | |
| Jaluit (2) | Daisy Alik-Momotaro | 382 | Elected |
| Jaluit (2) | Bilimon Sonny Baikidri Milne | 354 | Elected |
| Jaluit (2) | Jemi Nashion | 287 | Unseated |
| Jaluit (2) | Casten Nemra | 260 | Unseated |
| Jaluit (2) | Joe Lomae | 158 | |
| Jaluit (2) | Allison Nashion | 136 | |
| Jaluit (2) | Jerry Nathan | 76 | |
| Jaluit (2) | Jendrikdrik Paul | 60 | |
| Jaluit (2) | Jefferson Barton | 45 | |
| Kili/Bikini/Ejit (1) | Jess Gasper, Jr | 420 | Elected |
| Kili/Bikini/Ejit (1) | Peterson Jibas | 305 | Unseated |
| Kili/Bikini/Ejit (1) | Eldon Note | 129 | |
| Kili/Bikini/Ejit (1) | Glann Lewis | 56 | |
| Kwajalein (3) | David Paul | 878 | Re-elected |
| Kwajalein (3) | Kili Kabua | 784 | Elected |
| Kwajalein (3) | Kitlang Kabua | 729 | Re-elected |
| Kwajalein (3) | Lanny Laninaur Kabua | 566 | |
| Kwajalein (3) | Noda Lojkar | 273 | |
| Kwajalein (3) | Abacca Anjain Maddison | 270 | |
| Kwajalein (3) | Junios Malolo Marok | 160 | |
| Kwajalein (3) | Christina Kibin Piamon | 46 | |
| Lae (1) | Thomas Heine | 171 | Re-elected |
| Lae (1) | Morean Watak | 94 | |
| Lib (1) | Joe Bejang | 428 | Re-elected |
| Lib (1) | Stanley Bejang | 15 | |
| Likiep (1) | Wallace Peter | 121 | Elected |
| Likiep (1) | Thomas Kijiner, Jr | 121 | |
| Likiep (1) | Christopher Debrum | 114 | |
| Likiep (1) | James Capelle | 110 | |
| Likiep (1) | Frederick Jitto Debrum | 51 | |
| Likiep (1) | John Kunar Bungitak | 25 | |
| Majuro (5) | Kalani Kaneko | 1,878 | Re-elected |
| Majuro (5) | Tony Muller | 1,539 | Re-elected |
| Majuro (5) | Brenson Wase | 1,340 | Re-elected |
| Majuro (5) | David Kramer | 1,276 | Elected |
| Majuro (5) | Stephen Phillip | 1,232 | Re-elected |
| Majuro (5) | Yolanda Laninbit Lodge-Ned | 1,215 | |
| Majuro (5) | Patrick Langrine | 891 | |
| Majuro (5) | Yoland Jurelang | 886 | |
| Majuro (5) | William Ring | 776 | |
| Majuro (5) | Mailynn Langinlur Konelios | 701 | |
| Majuro (5) | Rebecca Lorennij | 535 | |
| Majuro (5) | Isaiah Alee | 506 | |
| Majuro (5) | Phillip Muller | 480 | |
| Majuro (5) | Austen Jurelang | 402 | |
| Majuro (5) | Wilbur Allen | 316 | |
| Majuro (5) | Antari Elbon | 266 | |
| Majuro (5) | Evelyn Lanki | 262 | |
| Majuro (5) | Jason Muller Batol | 155 | |
| Majuro (5) | Joseph Rilang | 111 | |
| Majuro (5) | Russell Kun | 96 | |
| Majuro (5) | Grinalee Mizutani | 82 | |
| Majuro (5) | Fugen James Wang | 66 | |
| Majuro (5) | Lawrence Muller | 63 | |
| Majuro (5) | Yoster John | 62 | |
| Majuro (5) | Lee L. Laijo | 50 | |
| Majuro (5) | Abner Abo | 47 | |
| Majuro (5) | Yoseph David | 45 | |
| Maloelap (1) | Bruce Bilimon | 320 | Re-elected |
| Maloelap (1) | Salome Andrike Lessep | 297 | |
| Maloelap (1) | Cathy Saito Lin | 236 | |
| Maloelap (1) | Christine Capelle Antakbon | 8 | |
| Maloelap (1) | Jimmy Jacob | 0 | |
| Mejit (1) | Dennis Momotaro | 176 | Re-elected |
| Mejit (1) | Helkena Anni | 157 | |
| Mejit (1) | Ronald Matthew, Jr | 12 | |
| Mejit (1) | Mattur Muller | 7 | |
| Mili (1) | Wilbur Heine | 392 | Re-elected |
| Mili (1) | Elizabeth Lometo Nott | 280 | |
| Namdrik (1) | Wisely Zackras | 294 | Re-elected |
| Namdrik (1) | Joe Joran Ned | 181 | |
| Namu (1) | Tony Aiseia | 517 | Re-elected |
| Namu (1) | Ace Doulatram | 457 | |
| Namu (1) | Jaclyn Lemari Solomon | 22 | |
| Rongelap (1) | Hilton Tonton Kendall | 320 | Elected |
| Rongelap (1) | Kenneth Kedi | 235 | Unseated |
| Rongelap (1) | Robert Anjain | 77 | |
| Rongelap (1) | Jusie Atdrik Schmidt | 26 | |
| Ujae (1) | Bremity Lakjohn | 125 | Elected |
| Ujae (1) | Atbi Riklon | 97 | Unseated |
| Ujae (1) | Waylon Muller | 97 | |
| Ujae (1) | Carlson Heine | 68 | |
| Ujae (1) | Bonnan Enos | 3 | |
| Utrok (1) | Hiroshi V. Yamamura | 341 | Re-elected |
| Utrok (1) | Robin Kios | 121 | |
| Wotho (1) | David Kabua | – | Re-elected unopposed |
| Wotje (1) | Ota Kisino | 321 | Re-elected |
| Wotje (1) | Harris Kaiko | 145 | |
| Wotje (1) | Que Keju | 80 | |
| Wotje (1) | Alson Morris | 4 | |
Source: RMI Ministry of Culture and Internal Affairs

== Aftermath ==
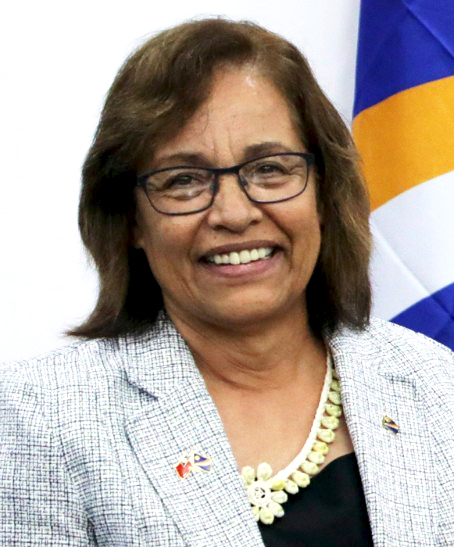
President Hilda Heine

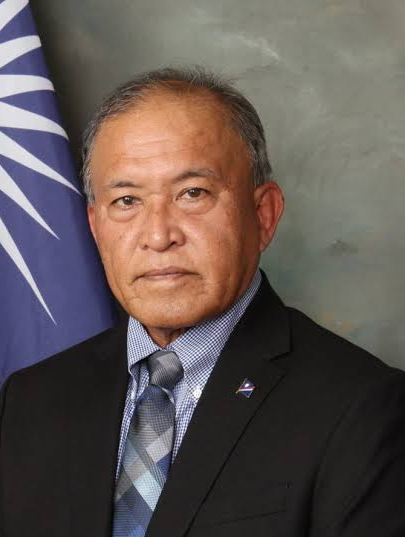
Outgoing president David Kabua

While elections in the Marshall Islands are officially nonpartisan, most members of the Nitijeļā are part of unofficial groupings. The group supporting the government of President David Kabua suffered losses including several cabinet members, while the group supporting former President Hilda Heine increased its numbers. The new Nitijeļā convened on 2 January 2024 to elect the President, Speaker, and Vice Speaker. Brenson Wase was elected Speaker and Issac Zackhras was elected Vice Speaker.

=== Presidential election ===
Incumbent president David Kabua lost to the Opposition candidate and former President Hilda Heine by one vote. Voting took place by secret ballot.

| Candidate | Party | Votes | % |
|---|---|---|---|
| Hilda Heine | Opposition | 17 | 51.52 |
| David Kabua | Government | 16 | 48.48 |
| Total | | 33 | 100.00 |
| Valid votes | | 33 | 100.00 |
| Invalid/blank votes | | 0 | 0.00 |
| Total votes | | 33 | 100.00 |
| Registered voters/turnout | | 33 | 100.00 |
Source: RNZ
