= 2011 Marshallese general election =

- 21 November 2011

All 33 seats in the Nitijeļā
	First party
Party	Independents
Seats after	33
Speaker before election
Alvin Jacklick
Elected
Speaker
Donald Capelle

General elections were held in the Marshall Islands on 21 November 2011. The general election is held every four years.

An estimated 36,000 Marshallese voted in the election. Final results were not known until after 5 December 2011, when overseas ballots were due.

Results indicated the incumbent president was likely to have the same one-vote majority in parliament he had before the election.

Health minister Amenta Matthew and former foreign minister Gerald Zackios lost reelection due to postal ballots.

A tie in the race for the Ujae Atoll seat was only broken after a recount.

== Results ==
Constituency	Candidate	Votes	Notes
Ailinglaplap (2)	Christopher Loeak	1,023	Elected
Ailinglaplap (2)	Ruben Zackhras	766	Elected
Ailinglaplap (2)	Gordon Note	649	
Ailinglaplap (2)	Harney A. Paul	180	
Ailuk (1)	Maynard Alfred	389	Elected
Ailuk (1)	Marie Maddison	227	
Ailuk (1)	Hackney Takju	17	
Arno (2)	Nidel Lorak	493	Elected
Arno (2)	Jiba B. Kabua	465	Elected
Arno (2)	Jejwarik H. Anton	451	
Arno (2)	Gerald Zackios	451	
Arno (2)	Mike Halferty	346	
Arno (2)	Juan T. Lokot	93	
Aur (1)	Hilda Heine	238	Elected
Aur (1)	Justin Lani	217	
Aur (1)	Danny F. Jack	162	
Aur (1)	Jimmy Jonathan	85	
Ebon (1)	John M. Silk	575	Elected
Ebon (1)	Clary Makroro	86	
Enewetak (1)	Jack Ading	450	Elected
Enewetak (1)	Yoster I. John	124	
Jabat (1)	Kessai Note	—	Elected unopposed
Jaluit (2)	Rien Morris	537	Elected
Jaluit (2)	Alvin Jacklick	488	Elected
Jaluit (2)	Jack Jorbon	311	
Jaluit (2)	Joe Hanchor	219	
Jaluit (2)	Fredrick J. Debrum	213	
Jaluit (2)	Marilyn J. Kabua	204	
Jaluit (2)	Darlene K. Korok	137	
Jaluit (2)	John Bungitak	53	
Kili/Bikini/Ejit (1)	Tomaki Juda	555	Elected
Kili/Bikini/Ejit (1)	Clann A. Lewis	272	
Kili/Bikini/Ejit (1)	March Samuel	77	
Kwajalein (3)	Michael M. Kabua	855	Elected
Kwajalein (3)	Jeban Riklon	693	Elected
Kwajalein (3)	Tony deBrum	648	Elected
Kwajalein (3)	Ataji Balos	440	
Lae (1)	Thomas Heine	309	Elected
Lae (1)	Rellong D. Lemari	261	
Lae (1)	Rino J. Phillip	187	
Lib (1)	Jerakoj J. Bejang	238	Elected
Lib (1)	Jamurlok K. Kabua	104	
Lib (1)	Aeto Bantol	78	
Lib (1)	Rudloph Paul	8	
Likiep (1)	Donald Capelle	477	Elected
Likiep (1)	Tom Kijiner	254	
Likiep (1)	James Capelle	228	
Likiep (1)	Christopher Debrum	161	
Majuro (5)	Jurelang Zedkaia	3,050	Elected
Majuro (5)	Tony Muller	2,518	Elected
Majuro (5)	David Kramer	2,418	Elected
Majuro (5)	Phillip H. Muller	2,095	Elected
Majuro (5)	Brenson Wase	1,883	Elected
Majuro (5)	Jeimata N. Kabua	972	
Majuro (5)	Daisy Alik-Momotaro	956	
Majuro (5)	Evelyn Lanki	924	
Majuro (5)	Obet J. Mote	780	
Majuro (5)	Rosalie A. Konou	667	
Majuro (5)	Wilbur Allen	616	
Majuro (5)	Alee K. Alik	469	
Majuro (5)	Jim J. Philippo	449	
Majuro (5)	Russell Langrine	349	
Majuro (5)	Caster Konou	308	
Maloelap (1)	Michael Konelios	393	Elected
Maloelap (1)	Bruce Bilimon	350	
Maloelap (1)	Langmos Hermios	197	
Maloelap (1)	Emil Debrum	23	
Mejit (1)	Dennis Momotaro	433	Elected
Mejit (1)	Helkena Anni	351	
Mejit (1)	Luckner K. Abner	54	
Mili (1)	Wilbur Heine	327	Elected
Mili (1)	Kejjo Bien	292	
Mili (1)	Tadashi Lometo	158	
Mili (1)	Losan E. Chinoska	136	
Namdrik (1)	Mattlan Zackhras	463	Elected
Namdrik (1)	Augustine B. Nakamura	125	
Namdrik (1)	William J. Swain	68	
Namu (1)	Tony Aiseia	345	Elected
Namu (1)	Kaiboke J. Kabua	204	
Namu (1)	Johnny Choban	92	
Namu (1)	Richard A. Bruce	80	
Rongelap (1)	Kenneth Kedi	258	Elected
Rongelap (1)	Atbi Riklon	192	
Rongelap (1)	Hilton T. Kendall	118	
Rongelap (1)	Abacca Anjain-Maddison	78	
Ujae (1)	Caios Lucky	119	Elected
Ujae (1)	Fredrick H. Muller	117	
Utrok (1)	Hiroshi V. Yamamura	405	Elected
Utrok (1)	Amenta Matthew	342	
Wotho (1)	David Kabua	—	Elected unopposed
Wotje (1)	Litokwa Tomeing	300	Elected
Wotje (1)	Atones Kaious	28	
Source: Election Passport

== Aftermath ==
The newly elected Nitijela elected the president on 3 January 2012. Only two candidates were nominated, incumbent Jurelang Zedkaia and long-time MP and government minister Christopher Loeak. Loeak won the election with 21 votes to 11 votes. Loeak was expected to name his cabinet and be sworn in within a week. Zedkaia agreed to co-operate with the new administration.

Candidate	Party	Votes	%
Christopher Loeak	Independent	21	65.62
Jurelang Zedkaia	Independent	11	34.38
Total		32	100.00
Valid votes		32	100.00
Invalid/blank votes		0	0.00
Total votes		32	100.00
Registered voters/turnout		32	100.00
