= 2017 Marshallese Constitutional Convention election =

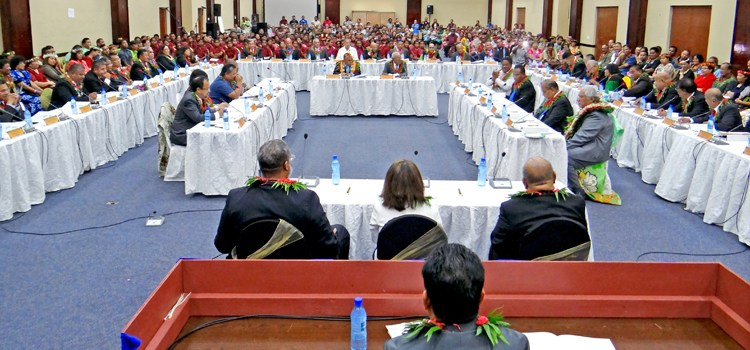
The convention

Constitutional Convention elections were held in the Marshall Islands on 21 February 2017.

== Background ==
A constitutional convention is used in the Marshall Islands to consider proposed constitutional amendments that have been endorsed by the Legislature. The convention cannot propose new amendments and can only debate those approved by the parliament. Previous conventions had been held in 1977, 1989 and 1995.

While more were added after the election, the proposed changes for the 2017 Constitutional Convention initially included:

- Direct election of the President.
- Creating the position of Vice-President.
- Stopping the Legislature removing the President, Vice-President and Cabinet from office by motion of no confidence.
- Requiring presidential candidates to be a natural-born citizen.
- Reserving six seats in the Legislature for women.
- Requiring automatic rejection of appropriation bills that do not provide a balanced budget.
- Protection from sexual discrimination being enshrined in the Bill of Rights.
- Creation of an ombudsman's office.
- Empowering the Attorney General to ask an independent body to investigate possible cases of fraud, corruption or unethical behaviour by elected officials and other high-ranking officials.
- Increasing the number of members of the Council of Iroij by one.
- Introducing a constitutional ban on the sale of land except where the lineage of the bwij (clan) owning the land is extinct.

== Electoral system ==
The 45 members of the Constitutional Convention consisted of 33 directly-elected delegates elected from the 33 Legislature districts, and 12 Iroijs (chiefs). Postal voting was not allowed.

== Campaign ==
A total of 119 candidates contested the 33 directly-elected seats, whilst 24 ran for the 12 seats reserved for the Iroijs. All but seven of the thirty-three members of the Legislature ran for election to the convention.

== Results ==
Elected members
| Seat | Member |
|---|---|
| Directly-elected | Jack J. Ading |
| Directly-elected | Tony Aiseia |
| Directly-elected | Jack Akeang |
| Directly-elected | Maynard Alfred |
| Directly-elected | Jejwarick H. Anton |
| Directly-elected | Jerakoj J. Bejang |
| Directly-elected | Winnie Benjamin |
| Directly-elected | Kejjo Bien |
| Directly-elected | Donald F. Capelle |
| Directly-elected | Stephen K. Dribo |
| Directly-elected | McAvoy M. Espern |
| Directly-elected | Thomas Heine |
| Directly-elected | Peterson Jibas |
| Directly-elected | Jimmy Jonathan |
| Directly-elected | David Kabua |
| Directly-elected | Hilton Kendall |
| Directly-elected | Jien Morris Lekka |
| Directly-elected | Nuia Loeak |
| Directly-elected | Yoland Logdge-Ned |
| Directly-elected | Nidel Lorak |
| Directly-elected | Rebecca Lorennij |
| Directly-elected | Lomes McKay |
| Directly-elected | Almo Momotaro |
| Directly-elected | Phillip H. Muller |
| Directly-elected | Neti Nathan |
| Directly-elected | Casten Nemra |
| Directly-elected | Kessai H. Note |
| Directly-elected | David Paul |
| Directly-elected | Atbi Riklon |
| Directly-elected | Jorelik Tibon |
| Directly-elected | Stanny Tomeing |
| Directly-elected | Brenson Wase |
| Directly-elected | Ruben Zackhras |
| Iroijs | Helkena Anni |
| Iroijs | Bruce Bilimon |
| Iroijs | Elbod Boaz |
| Iroijs | Kiorina Capelle |
| Iroijs | Wilbur Heine |
| Iroijs | Kosma Johanes |
| Iroijs | Michael Kabua |
| Iroijs | Tommy Kijiner Jr. |
| Iroijs | Kotak Loeak |
| Iroijs | Christopher J. Loeak |
| Iroijs | Lein Zedkeia |
Source: RMI Constitutional Convention

== Aftermath ==
The Constitutional Convention opened in April 2017. Kessai Note was elected as the body's President, defeating Christopher Loeak by a vote of 22–21.

After a long pause due to the Covid-19 pandemic, the works of the convention was finally put to a referendum on 25 April 2025.
