= Minister in Assistance to the President of Marshall Islands =

Minister in Assistance to the President of the Marshall Islands
- Minister in Jipan Būreejtōn eoin M̧ajeļ (Marshallese)
- Seal of Government of the Republic of the Marshall Islands

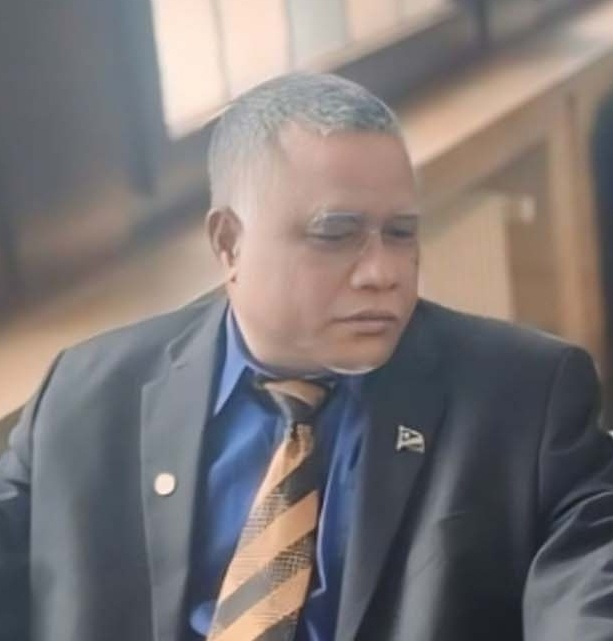
- Incumbent; Bremity Lakjohn since 3 January 2024
- Member of: Cabinet of Marshall Islands
- Reports to: President
- Nominator: The Cabinet
- Appointer: President on advice from the Cabinet
- Term length: At the Pleasure of the President
- Constituting instrument: Constitution of the Marshall Islands
- Inaugural holder: Johnsay Riklon
- Formation: January 1997; 29 years ago
- Salary: US$43,000 annually

Minister in Assistance to the President of the Marshall Islands is a member in the cabinet of Marshall Islands. The person is appointed by the President from among the members of the Nitijela. The person acts as a substitute for the President of the Marshall Islands as his or her vice president.

== List of the Ministers in Assistance ==
Name	Inaugurated	Left office	President
Johnsay Riklon	January 1997	1999	Imata Kabua
Christopher Loeak	1999	January 2000	Imata Kabua
Gerald Zackios	January 2000	July 2001	Kessai Note
Tadashi Lometo	July 2001	February 2004	Kessai Note
Witten T. Philippo	February 2004	March 2006	Kessai Note
Tadashi Lometo	March 2006	January 2008	Kessai Note
Christopher Loeak	January 2008	September 2009	Litokwa Tomeing
Ruben Zackhras	September 2009	January 2012	Litokwa Tomeing, Jurelang Zedkaia
Tony deBrum	January 2012	May 2014	Christopher Loeak
Wilbur Heine	May 2014	January 2016	Christopher Loeak
David Kabua	January 2016	January 2016	Casten Nemra
Mattlan Zackhras	January 2016	August 2017	Hilda Heine
John Silk	September 2017	October 2017	Hilda Heine
David Paul	October 2017	January 2020	Hilda Heine
Christopher Loeak	January 2020	January 2024	David Kabua
Bremity Lakjohn	January 2024	Incumbent	Hilda Heine
