= Amenta Matthew =

Marshallese politician

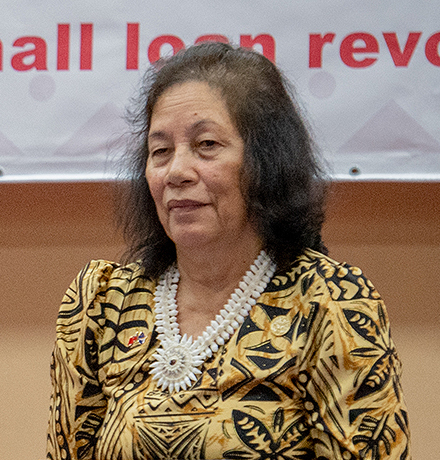
- Matthew in 2019

Member of the Nitijela
- In office 2015–2019
- Minister: Internal Affairs (2016–2019)
- Preceded by: Hiroshi Yamamura
- Succeeded by: Hiroshi Yamamura
- Constituency: Utirik Atoll

Member of the Nitijela
- In office 2007–2011
- Minister: Health (2008–2011)
- Preceded by: Hiroshi Yamamura
- Succeeded by: Hiroshi Yamamura
- Constituency: Utirik Atoll

Personal details
- Born: June 24, 1952 (age 74) Majuro, Marshall Islands
- Education: Defiance College (BA)

Amenta Matthew (born 24 June 1952) is a Marshallese politician. She was a member of the Legislature of the Marshall Islands from 2007 to 2011 and from 2015 to 2019, representing the electorate of Utrik. She was Minister of Health under Presidents Litokwa Tomeing and Jurelang Zedkaia from 2008 to 2011 and Minister of Internal Affairs under Hilda Heine from 2016 to 2019. She was the second woman in the Marshall Islands to serve as a government minister.

== Biography ==
Matthew was born in Majuro and was educated at Uliga Elementary School in Majuro and Mizba High School in Chuuk in the Federated States of Micronesia before graduating from Defiance College in Ohio in the United States in 1976. She was Secretary of the Marshall Islands Political Commission from 1977 to 1979, Assistant Clerk of Cabinet from 1979 to 1981 and Clerk of Cabinet from 1981 to 2002. She then worked for the Land Registration Administration Authority from 2002 until her election to parliament in 2007.

She was first elected to parliament at the 2007 election, defeating Hiroshi Yamamura. In January 2008, she was promoted to Cabinet as Minister for Health by new President Litokwa Tomeing, becoming the Marshall Islands' first woman minister in twelve years. She had been considered a swing vote in the formation of the new government. As Health Minister, in response to an outbreak of drug-resistant tuberculosis, she drafted legislation that would give the Director of Health the power to quarantine tuberculosis patients who did not comply with prevention requirements. In May 2010, she testified before the United States Congress about the impact of past United States nuclear testing on Utrik Atoll. In September 2011, she called for a global response to non-communicable diseases such as diabetes and heart disease, stating that the amount having to be spent locally was unsustainable, although praising the impact of medical aid from Taiwan. She lost her seat to Yamamura at the 2011 election; she had led on domestic votes, but was defeated after the counting of postal votes. She challenged the result in the High Court of the Marshall Islands, claiming that postal ballots had not been properly certified, but was unsuccessful.

After her 2011 defeat, Matthew was appointed to the Board of Regents of the College of the Marshall Islands. She then won back her seat at the 2015 election, defeating Yamamura a second time. In February 2016, she was appointed to the Cabinet of new President Hilda Heine as Minister for Internal Affairs. In June 2017, she raised concern about the rate of illegal adoptions from the Marshall Islands to the United States through Hawaii, resulting in the U.S. Embassy flagging it as an issue of concern and the Honolulu Star-Advertiser publishing a front-page story about the issue. She was defeated at the 2019 Marshallese general election.
