= Marie Davis Milne =

Marshallese politician

Honorable Marie Davis Milne

Senator for Ebon Atoll in Nitijela
- Incumbent
- Assumed office 2 January 2024

Personal details
- Party: None
- Spouse: Sonny Bakidri Milne

Marie Davis Milne is a Marshallese politician currently serving in the Nitijeļā as the senator for Ebon.

== Political career ==
Prior to entering national politics, Milne was the elected mayor of Ebon Atoll.

In the 2023 Marshallese general election, Milne ran as a candidate for the Ebon constituency and was elected after receiving 381 votes against John Silk's 369 votes. In March 2024, she was appointed as chair of the Deportation Taskforce, a newly established body set up by President Hilda Heine's government.

== Personal life ==
Milne is married to Sonny Bakidri Milne, who is also a senator in the Nitijelā.
