= Kitlang Kabua =

Marshallese politician

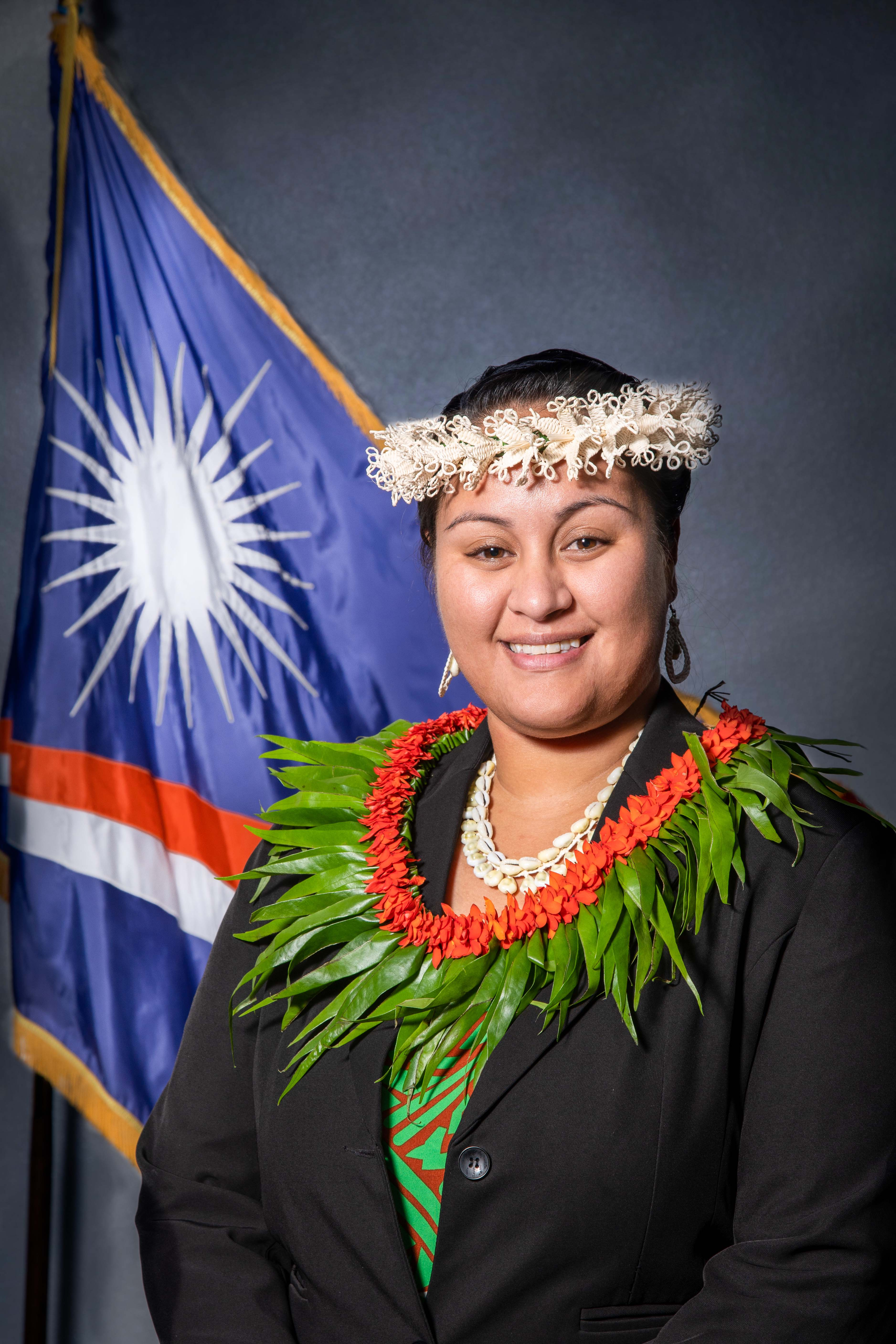
- Kabua in 2020

Minister of Foreign Affairs
- In office June 2022 – 2023
- President: David Kabua
- Preceded by: Casten Nemra
- Succeeded by: Jack Ading

Minister of Education
- In office 13 January 2020 – 2022
- President: David Kabua

Personal details
- Party: Independent

Kitlang Kabua (born 26 June 1991) is a Marshallese politician. She was elected to the Legislature of the Marshall Islands (Nitijeļā) for Kwajalein in the 2019 Marshallese general election, receiving 931 votes. She was 28 at the time of her election, making her the youngest person ever elected to the Nitijeļā. Kabua and former President Hilda Heine were the only two women who obtained a seat. She subsequently was appointed Minister of Education, Sports and Training in the cabinet of her uncle President David Kabua. Kabua took her oath of office on 13 January 2020. The formal inauguration of the cabinet took place on 20 January.

In June 2020 she was included as part of the negotiating team for the renewal of the Compact of Free Association. As Minister she stated in August 2020 she wanted to improve the Marshall Islands Standard Achievement Test scores and worked on sending assistance teams to the outer islands. She also worked on the introduction of a hot lunch program at schools.

She is also a family member of the first President Amata Kabua, the 2nd president Imata Kabua and the 9th president David Kabua (The Kabua's family).
