= February 1986 Palauan Compact of Free Association referendum =

21 February 1986

Results
Choice	Votes	%
Yes	5,079	72.19%
No	1,957	27.81%
Valid votes	7,036	99.56%
Invalid or blank votes	31	0.44%
Total votes	7,067	100.00%
Registered voters/turnout	9,905	71.35%

A third referendum on the Compact of Free Association was held in Palau on 21 February 1986, after the previous two referendums had failed to achieve the 75% in favour necessary. Voters were asked whether they approved of the Compact of Free Association between Palau and the United States signed on 10 January 1986. It was approved by 72.2% of voters, with a turnout of 71.3%.

== Results ==
Choice	Votes	%
For	5,079	72.2
Against	1,957	27.8
Invalid/blank votes	31	-
Total	7,067	100
Source: Nohlen et al.
