= 2025 Marshallese constitutional referendum =

A constitutional referendum was held in the Marshall Islands on 25 April 2025. Citizens voted on amendments to the constitution proposed by parliament and approved by the constitutional convention elected in 2017. Originally scheduled to be held concurrently with the 2023 Marshallese general election, it was delayed to 2025.

== Proposed changes ==
The following are the proposed changes to be voted on in the referendum:

1. Article XI, Citizenship, Section 2, Persons who may be Registered as Citizens, Paragraph 1, Subparagraph 1b: "that he has been resident in the Republic for not less than 3 years, and is the parent of a child who is a citizen of the Republic;" changed to "that he has been a resident in the Republic for not less than 10 years, is the parent of a child who is a citizen of the Republic, and is married to the parent of that child, which parent is also citizen of the Republic". For this purpose, "marriage" is defined as "between a non-citizen and a citizen of the Republic solemnized pursuant to law but does not include a customary marriage."
2. Increasing the number of members of the Council of Iroij by one with the addition of a new member from Mili Atoll
3. Adding that in addition to the Traditional Rights Court being "limited to the determination of questions relating to titles or to land rights or to other legal interests depending wholly or partly on customary law and traditional practice in the Republic of the Marshall Islands", that it has original jurisdiction in these cases. Decisions of this court can be appealed to the Supreme Court.
4. Adding the position of Ombudsman. The Speaker of the Nitijela will nominate (with the approval of the Nitijela) the position, with the President being the official appointer. The Ombudsman is independent of other authorities, and may hold the position indefinitely during good behavior until a mandatory retirement age of 72 ("unless, in the case of an Ombudsman who is not a citizen of the Republic, the Ombudsman has been appointed for a term of one or more years"), and will report at least once a year to the Nitijela. The Ombudsman can resign by doing so in writing to the Speaker, but cannot be "removed or suspended from office except on the like grounds and in the like manner as a judge of the High Court or of the Supreme Court". After serving as Ombudsman, a person becomes ineligible to be appointed to "any other office in the service of the Republic" for three years after leaving office. The Ombudsman will "investigate and may prosecute any fraud, misuse of public funds, misconduct in office, abuse of office, bribery, corruption, or other ethical conduct contrary to law by elected or high officials" in addition to any other duties and powers conferred on them by law.
5. Adding that in order to be a candidate for the legislature, a qualified person must "have land rights by birth and be a natural born citizen". In this case, a natural born citizen means "a person who, at the time of birth, has a jowi from his mother or father and is a citizen pursuant to subparagraph (a) of paragraph 2 of Section 1 of Article XI"
6. Adding that for purposes of the legislature, the claimed territory of Anen Kio shall be "included in the electoral district with which it is most closely associated, pursuant to the customary law or any traditional practice"
7. Grouping Enewetak with Ujelang for purposes of the sending of one Iroijlaplap to the Council of Iroij

== Results ==
Preliminary results showed that six of the seven amendments reached the two-thirds threshold needed for approval. Only the second proposal failed to receive approval, with 64% voting in favor. The referendum was characterized by very low turnout, with only 10% of registered voters casting a ballot.

On 28 May 2025, Speaker Brenson Wase signed the referendum results confirming that six of seven constitutional amendments were approved by Marshall Islands voters.

Question	Yes		No		Result
1. Citizenship	4,052	73.13	1,489	26.87	Approved
2. Council of Iroij members	3,500	63.62	2,001	36.38	Rejected
3. Traditional Rights Court	4,075	74.81	1,372	25.19	Approved
4. Ombudsman	4,141	76.43	1,277	23.57	Approved
5. Candidate qualifications	4,625	85.44	788	14.56	Approved
6. Anen Kio	4,332	80.60	1,043	19.40	Approved
7. Grouping Enewetak and Ujelang	4,176	78.93	1,115	21.07	Approved
Source: RMI Electoral Administration
