= List of Oceanian countries by GDP growth =

This is a list of estimates of the real gross domestic product growth rate (not rebased GDP) in Oceanian states for the latest years recorded in the CIA World Factbook. The list contains some non-sovereign territories.

== List ==
Real GDP Growth Rates in Oceania

Rank	Country	GDP growth rate (%)	Year
1	Northern Mariana Islands (Note: The Northern Mariana Islands is an unincorporated territory of the United States)	16.6	2022 est.
2	Cook Islands (Note: The Cook Islands is an self-governing territory in free association with New Zealand)	10.5	2022 est.
3	Samoa	8.6	2023 est.
4	Fiji	7.5	2023 est.
5	Guam (Note: Guam is an unincorporated territory of the United States)	5.1	2022 est.
6	French Polynesia (Note: French Polynesia is an overseas collectivity of France)	4.5	2022 est.
7	Kiribati	4.1	2023 est.
8	Tuvalu	3.9	2023 est.
9	New Caledonia (Note: New Caledonia is a special collectivity of France)	3.5	2022 est.
10	Australia	3.4	2023 est.
11	Solomon Islands	3.1	2023 est.
12	Papua New Guinea	3.0	2023 est.
13	Vanuatu	2.2	2023 est.
14	Palau (Note: Palau is a sovereign state in free association with the United States under the Compact of Free Association)	1.9	2023 est.
15	American Samoa (Note: American Samoa is an unincorporated territory of the United States)	1.7	2022 est.
16	Micronesia (Note: Micronesia is a sovereign state in free association with the United States under the Compact of Free Association)	0.8	2023 est.
17	New Zealand	0.7	2023 est.
18	Nauru	0.6	2023 est.
19	Tonga	-2.3	2022 est.
20	Marshall Islands (Note: The Marshall Islands is a sovereign state in free association with the United States under the Compact of Free Association)	-3.9	2023 est.

== See also ==
- Economic growth
- GDP
