= December 1986 Palauan Compact of Free Association referendum =

2 December 1986
- Do you approve Free Association with the United States as set forth in the Compact of Free Association signed on January 10, 1986 inclusive of its Subsidiary Agreements and as subsequently enacted by the United States Congress expressly approving the provisions of the Compact, including its Section 324, whereby the Government of the United States, in carrying out its security and defense responsibilities under the Compact of Free Association, has the right to operate nuclear capable or nuclear propelled vessels within the jurisdiction of Palau?

Results
Choice	Votes	%
Yes	5,789	65.97%
No	2,986	34.03%
Valid votes	8,775	99.44%
Invalid or blank votes	49	0.56%
Total votes	8,824	100.00%
Registered voters/turnout	10,760	82.01%

A fourth referendum on the Compact of Free Association was held in Palau on 2 December 1986, after the previous three referendums had failed to achieve the 75% in favour necessary. Voters were asked whether they approved of the Compact of Free Association between Palau and the United States signed on 10 January 1986. It was approved by 66% of voters with a turnout of 82%.

== Results ==
Choice	Votes	%
For	5,789	65.97
Against	2,986	34.03
Total	8,775	100.00
Valid votes	8,775	99.44
Invalid/blank votes	49	0.56
Total votes	8,824	100.00
Registered voters/turnout	10,760	82.01
Source: Nohlen et al.
