= Senator Lanham =

Senator Lanham may refer to:

- Charles C. Lanham (1928–2015), West Virginia State Senate
- John Lanham (1924–2007), Hawaii State Senate
