= August 1987 Palauan Compact of Free Association referendum =

A sixth referendum on the Compact of Free Association was held in Palau on 21 August 1987, after the previous five referendums had failed to achieve the 75% in favour necessary. Voters were asked whether they approved of the Compact of Free Association between Palau and the United States signed on 10 January 1986. It was approved by 73.0% of voters, with a turnout of 74.7%.

== Results ==
Choice	Votes	%
For	5,964	73.0
Against	2,201	27.0
Invalid/blank votes	17	-
Total	8,182	100
Source: Nohlen et al.
