= Joe Bejang =

Marshallese politician

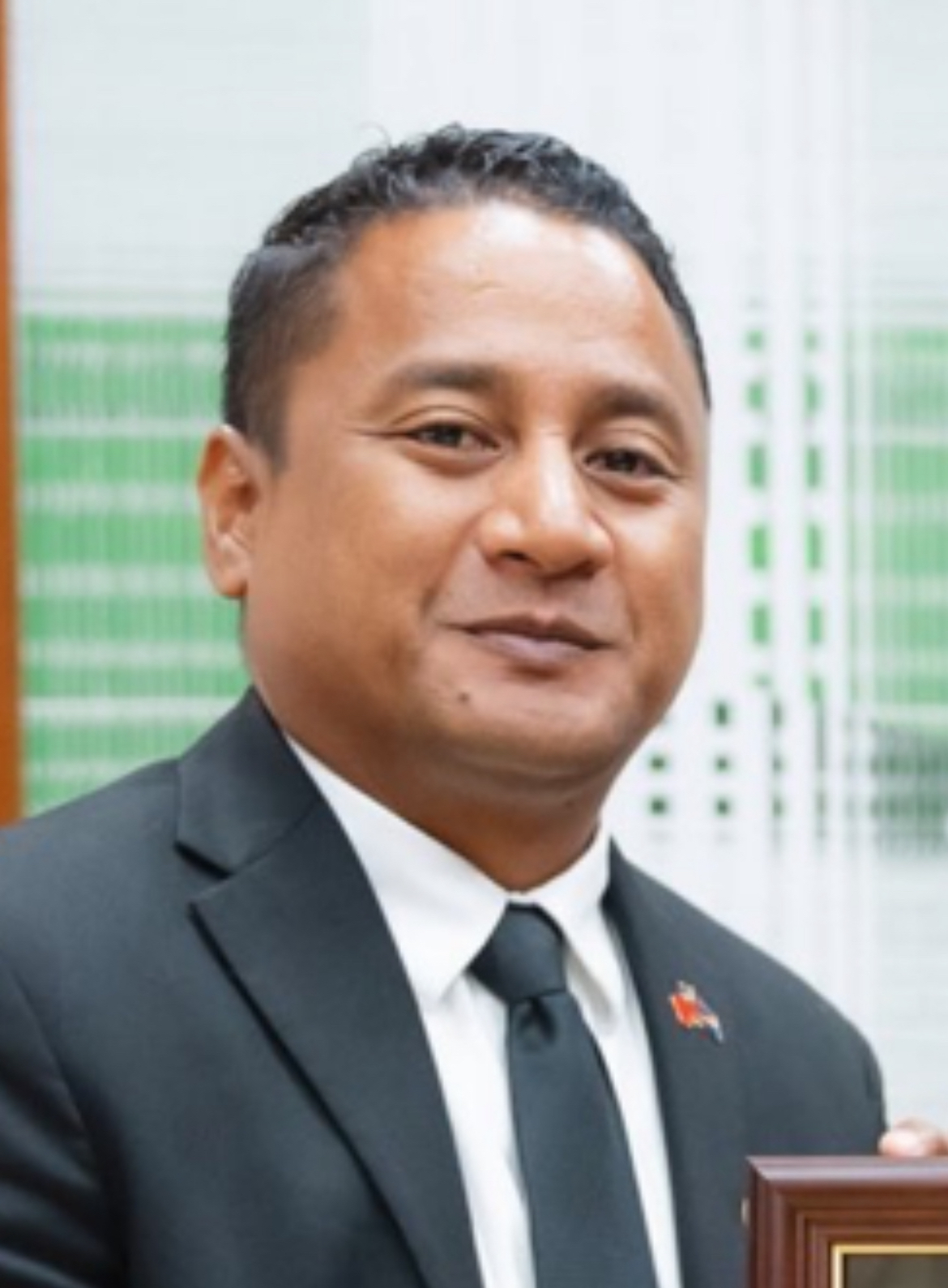
- Bejang in 2024

Minister of Education, Sports and Training
- Incumbent
- Assumed office January 2024
- President: Hilda Heine

Member of the Nitijela
- Incumbent
- Assumed office 2019
- Constituency: Lib Island

Personal details
- Party: Kien Eo Am (KEA)

Joe Bejang is a Marshallese politician serving Lib Island in the Legislature of the Marshall Islands, the Nitijela. He was elected in the 2019 election and re-elected in 2023.
