= Bremity Lakjohn =

Marshallese politician

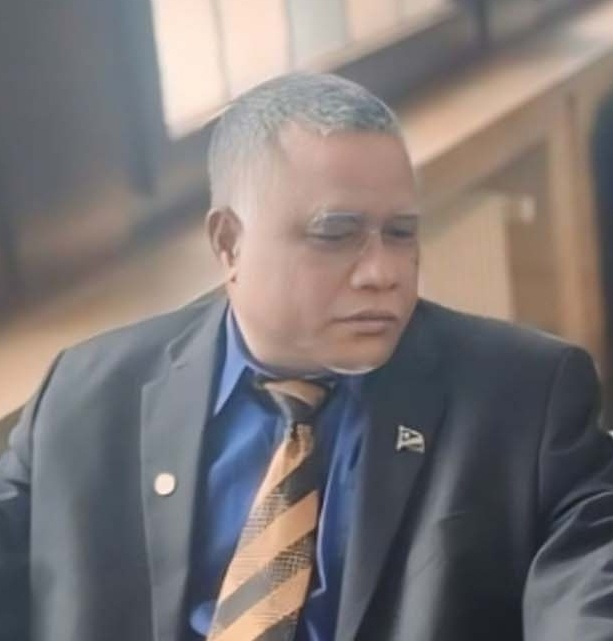
- Lakjohn in 2024

Minister in Assistance to the President
- Incumbent
- Assumed office January 2024
- President: Hilda Heine
- Preceded by: Christopher Loeak

Bremity Lakjohn is a Marshallese politician and member of the Nitijela (Marshall Islands parliament) elected from Ujae Atoll.

He has nursing degrees from the University of Guam, from the College of the Marshall Islands, and from Niigata University. He worked as a public health nurse in Ebeye, and later in Majuro.

In the parliamentary elections of 2023, he was elected as the representative of Ujae Atoll. In January 2024, he was appointed to the cabinet of President Hilda Heine as Minister-in-Assistance to the President and as Minister of Environment.
