= Witten Philippo =

Marshallese politician (born 1958)

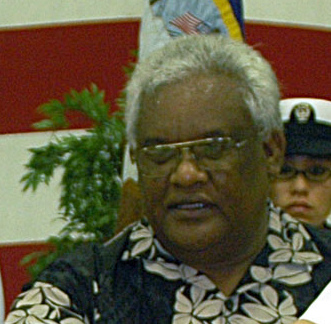
- Philippo in 2007

Minister in Assistance to the President
- In office February 2004 – March 2006
- President: Kessai Note
- Preceded by: Tadashi Lometo
- Succeeded by: Tadashi Lometo

Member of the Nitijela
- In office 1997–2008
- Constituency: Majuro

Minister of Justice
- In office 2000–2004
- In office 2006–2008

Personal details
- Born: Witten T. Philippo; 1948 (age 77–78)
- Education: University of Papua New Guinea
- Occupation: Judge, politician

Witten T. Philippo (born 1958) is a Marshallese judge and politician and former Minister in Assistance to the President of Marshall Islands.

== Biography ==
Philippo was born in 1958. initially worked as a prosecutor. In 1984, he got bachelor of laws from the University of Papua New Guinea. He was assistant attorney-general from 1984 to 1988. He was appointed associate justice in the High Court of the Marshall Islands from 1989 to 1996. He was acting chief justice in 1994 and 1995.

Philippo was elected to Nitijela, and represented Majuro from 1997 to 2008. During this time, he was appointed Minister of Justice in about 2007, and also Minister in Assistance to the President of Kessai Note from February 2004 to March 2006.

Philippo was reappointed associate justice to the High Court of the Marshall Islands in November 2018 to service until age 72, January 31, 2030.
