= David Paul (politician) =

Marshallese politician

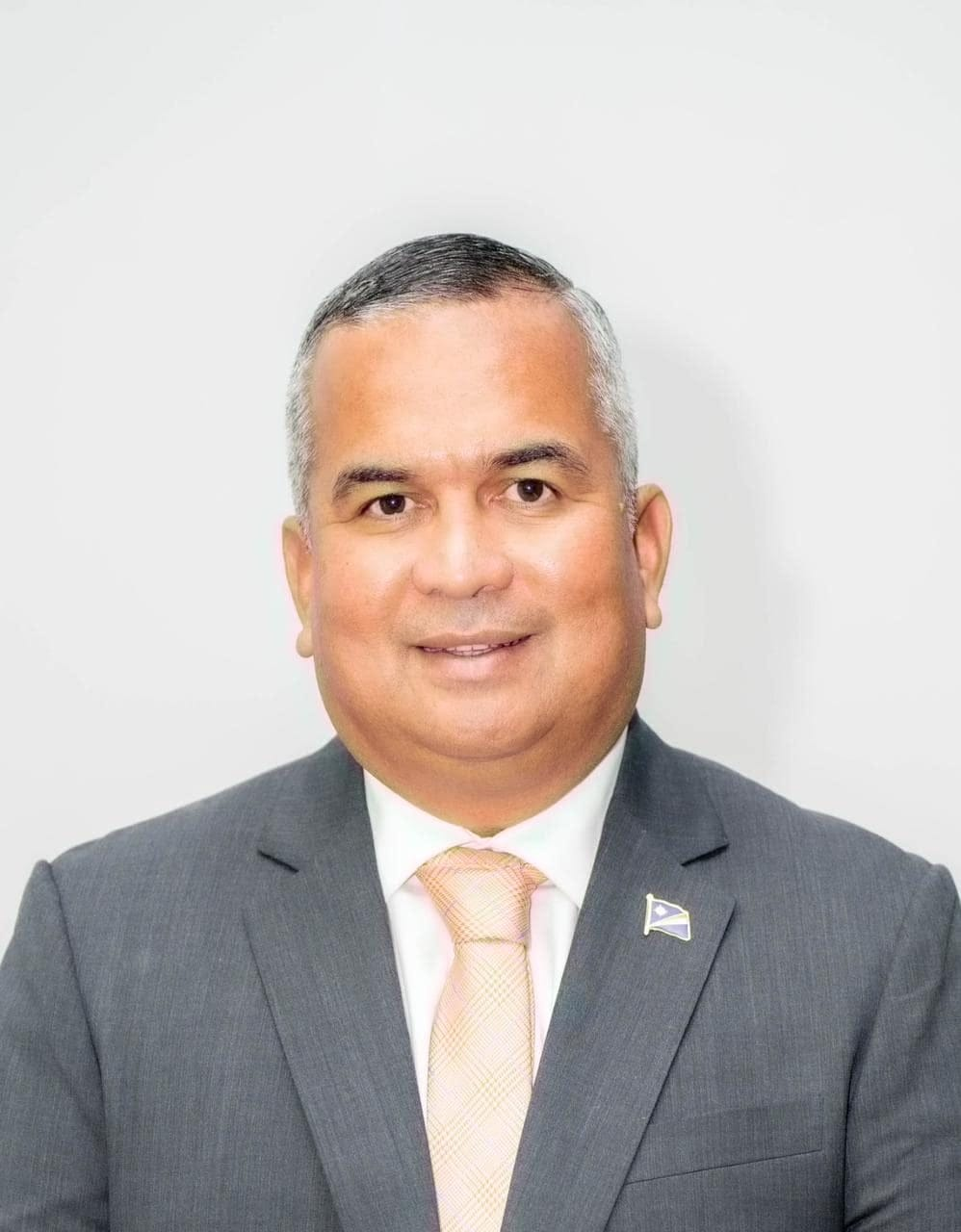
- Paul in 2024

Minister of Finance of the Marshall Islands
- Incumbent
- Assumed office January 2024
- President: Hilda Heine
- Preceded by: Casten Nemra

Minister in Assistance to the President
- In office October 2017 – January 2020
- President: Hilda Heine
- Preceded by: John Silk
- Succeeded by: Christopher Loeak

David Paul is a Marshallese politician and senator serving in the Nitijela (Marshall Islands parliament) elected from Kwajalein. He served as Minister of Environment in the cabinet of President Hilda Heine. He was first appointed to cabinet position as Minister-in-Assistance to the President in 2017 when he replaced Mattlan Zackhras the occupant of the office who died suddenly. Paul was known to be a close ally of president Heine. He was appointed Minister of Finance of the Marshall Islands in January 2024.
