= Tadashi Lometo =

Marshallese politician

Tadashi Gushi Lometo

Minister in Assistance to the President of Marshall Islands
- In office March 2006 – January 2008
- President: Kessai Note
- Preceded by: Witten T. Philippo
- Succeeded by: Christopher Loeak
- In office July 2001 – February 2004
- President: Kessai Note
- Preceded by: Gerald Zackios
- Succeeded by: Witten T. Philippo

Personal details
- Born: 16 July 1953 Mili Atoll
- Died: 15 July 2016 (aged 62) Oahu, Hawai'i

Tadashi Gushi Lometo was a Marshallese politician, former Minister in Assistance to the President of Marshall Islands and government minister.

Lometo was born on 16 July 1953 on Nallu Island, Mili Atoll. He studied in University of Guam, University of Central Oklahoma and University of Hawaiʻi at Mānoa and received a bachelor's degree. Lometo worked as a protestant minister. He was elected mayor of Mili Atoll in 1982.

Lometo was elected as senator in the Legislature of the Marshall Islands representing Mili Atoll from March 1996, and served until 2008. He was a member of a committee investigating the sale of Marshallese passports to citizens of People's Republic of China.

Lometo served as minister of health from 2000 to 2001. He was appointed Minister in Assistance to the President of Marshall Islands in the cabinets of Kessai Note from July 2001 to February 2004, and from March 2006 to January 2008. Later he became the clerk of the Legislature from 2013 until his retirement in 2014.

He died on 15 July 2016 in Oahu, Hawai'i.
