= John Lanham =

American politician

John C. Lanham (December 6, 1924 – August 14, 2007) was an American state legislator in Hawaii and Circuit Court judge. He also served as the Chief Justice of the High Court of the Marshall Islands.

== Early life ==
John Lanham was raised in an orphanage in South Carolina. In an interview later in life, Lanham explained how the experience had affected his view of the law, "The first thing I think of when I study a law is: What will be its effect on (poor) people."

He served on a B-25 bomber during World War II and in the American infantry during the Korean War. He arrived in Hawaii after the wars.

== Career ==
Lanham was first elected to the last Hawaii Territorial Legislature before it became a state in 1959. He next served in the Hawaii House of Representatives and then as a Hawaiian state senator. During his time in office, Lanham focused on the creation of an office to assist the poor in paying for legal advice. He also helped to create Hawaii's Family Court system, reformed the bail system and modernized the state's criminal code.

Hawaiian Governor John A. Burns appointed Lanham to the Hawaiian Circuit Court in Honolulu in 1970.

Lanham was named the Chief Justice of the High Court of the Marshall Islands in 1982. The Marshall Islands were a trust territory of United States at the time. He was replaced as Chief Justice by Nelson Doi in 1985.

== Death ==
John C. Lanham died in California on August 14, 2007. He was survived by his wife, Annie, daughters Patrice and Catherine, son Robert, and grandchildren Tatum and Kyle.
