= Mattlan Zackhras =

Marshallese politician (1970–2017)

His Excellency Mattlan Zackhras
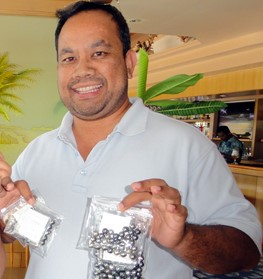
- Zackhras in 2012

11th Minister in Assistance to the President
- In office January 28, 2016 – August 8, 2017
- President: Hilda Heine
- Preceded by: David Kabua
- Succeeded by: John Silk

Personal details
- Born: January 13, 1970 Namdrik, Trust Territory of the Pacific Islands (Now the Marshall Islands)
- Died: August 8, 2017 (aged 47) Taipei, Taiwan (ROC)
- Cause of death: Heart failure
- Spouse: Angela J Zackhras
- Children: 3
- Parent: Ruben Zackhras (father)
- Education: Urbana University

Mattlan Zackhras (January 13, 1970 – August 8, 2017) was a Marshallese politician and government minister. He was a member of the Nitijeļā for Namdrik Atoll since 2004 and was serving as Minister in Assistance to the President of Marshall Islands under President Hilda Heine from January 2016 until his death.

== Life ==
Zackhras was the son of the later acting President Ruben Zackhras. Zackhras graduated from the Marshall Islands High School in 1989. He then received his bachelor's degree in businessman administration and management from Urbana University. He was deputy chief of mission in the Marshall Islands Embassy in Washington DC, United States, for around seven years.

Zackhras was elected as a member of Nitijela for Namdrik Atoll in the 2003 Marshallese general election and assumed office in January 2004. In his first term Zackhras was appointed Minister of Public Works under President Kessai Note. He was re-elected for his constituency in the 2007 elections and served as Minister of Resources and Development from 2008 to 2012. Zackhras was once again elected in the 2011 elections and finally the 2015 Marshallese general election. In January 2016 he was appointed Minister in Assistance to the President of Marshall Islands by President Hilda Heine. In this position, Zackhras acted as a substitute for the President of Marshall Islands.

Zackhras died of heart failure in the Shuang Ho Hospital in Taipei, Taiwan, on August 8, 2017, aged 47. He was survived by his spouse, Angela J Zackhras, and three children.
