= Gerald Zackios =

Ambassador of the Republic of the Marshall Islands to the United States

Gerald M. Zackios
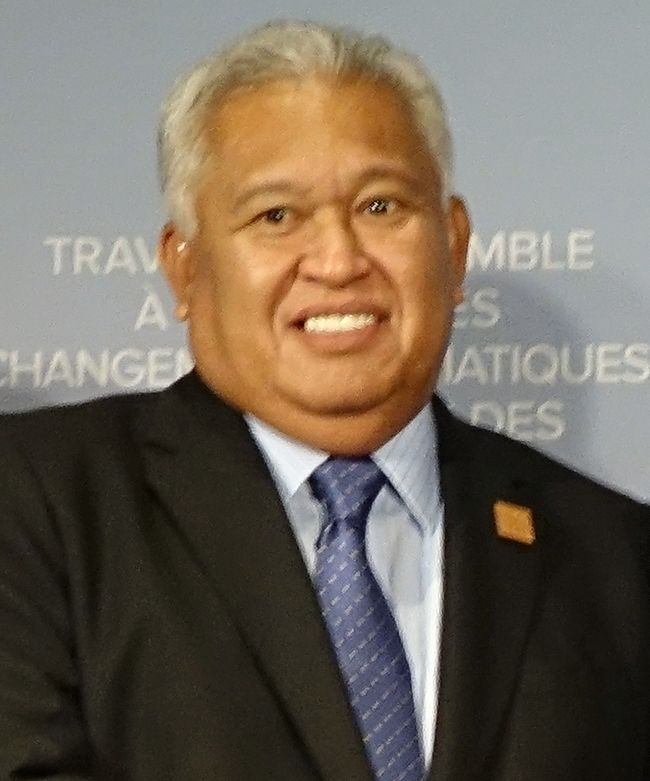
- Gerald Zackios in 2018 in Halifax, Nova Scotia

Minister in Assistance to the President of Marshall Islands
- In office January 2000 – July 2001
- President: Kessai Note
- Preceded by: Christopher Loeak
- Succeeded by: Tadashi Lometo

Personal details
- Born: 1965 (age 60–61)

Gerald M. Zackios (born 1965) is a Marshallese politician and diplomat. He was a member of the Legislature of the Marshall Islands (Nitijeļā) from 2000 until 2012. During this period he was Minister in Assistance to the President of Marshall Islands from 2000 until 2001 and Minister of Foreign Affairs from 2001 until 2007. He serves as the Ambassador of the Republic of the Marshall Islands to the United States since June 2016.

== Life ==
Zackios was born in 1965. In 1985 he started working as a fiscal officer for the Department of Aging in the Ministry of Social Services. After holding the position for two years went to study at the University of Papua New Guinea, where he obtained a bachelor of law degree in 1989. Zackios then returned to the Marshall Islands where he worked as Assistant Attorney General from 1990 to 1992. While working in this position he also studied at the International Maritime Law Institute in Malta. He graduated with a master's degree in International Maritime Law in 1992. Zackios was subsequently promoted to Deputy Attorney General. He held this position from 1992 to 1995. He then served as Acting Attorney General until his appointment as Permanent Attorney General in 1996.

Zackios worked as Attorney General until he won a seat in the Legislature of the Marshall Islands (Nitijeļā) for Arno Atoll during the 1999 Marshallese general election. He served as Minister in Assistance to the President under President Kessai Note from 2000 until 2001. Zackios further served in Note's cabinet as Minister of Foreign Affairs from 2001 until 2007. While member of the Nitijeļā Zackios was Chief Negotiator for the Compact of Free Association between the Marshall Islands during the renegotiations which lasted between 2001 and 2004. He also helped negotiate a deal with the United States that extended its use of the Ronald Reagan Ballistic Missile Defense Test Site until at least 2066. He was Vice Speaker in the Nitijeļā between September 2011 and January 2012. After having served three terms Zackios lost his seat during the 2011 Marshallese general election after postal ballots from the United States were counted.

Upon his departure from the Nitijeļā, Zackios subsequently started his own law firm. Between January 2012 and July 2013 he practised law. He then became Regional Director for the Pacific Community North Pacific Regional Office in Pohnpei, Federated States of Micronesia. Zackios remained in that position until he was appointed ambassador of the Marshall Islands to the United States. He was sworn in as ambassador to the United States on 20 June 2016. He presented his credentials to President Barack Obama on 16 September 2016.

In autumn 2019, leaders of the five Micronesian countries, consisting of the Marshall Islands, Nauru, Palau, Kiribati and the Federated States of Micronesia, made Zackios their nominee to succeed Meg Taylor in the position of Secretary General of the Pacific Islands Forum. In September 2020 the five leaders stated there should be no more delay in electing the successor of Taylor and that they still backed Zackios. By October 2020 Palau and the Federated States of Micronesia (FSM) threatened to leave the organization if Zackios was not selected, with FSM President David W. Panuelo stating they had made a gentlemen's agreement for sub-regional rotation for the position of Secretary General. In February 2021, after Henry Puna was instead elected to the post with the support of Australia and New Zealand, the five Micronesian countries withdrew from the Forum.

== Personal life ==
Zackios was married to Viola Milne.

Apart from his Marshallese citizenship he is a citizen of Palau.
