= Wilbur Heine =

Marshallese politician

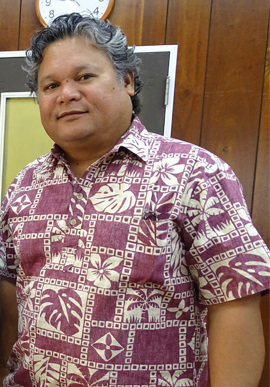
- Heine in 2020

Minister in Assistance to the President
- In office May 2014 – January 2016
- President: Christopher Loeak
- Preceded by: Tony deBrum
- Succeeded by: David Kabua

Wilbur Heine is a Marshallese politician and government minister. From May 2014 to January 2016 he was Minister in Assistance to the President of Marshall Islands. In 2013 he was the Minister for Internal Affairs. Heine has done much work towards the environment, against climate change and disasters in the Marshall Islands.

In 2015 he was elected to the Legislature of the Marshall Islands from Mili Atoll. In February 2016, he was appointed minister of education in the cabinet led by President Hilda Heine. Wilbur is a cousin of Hilda Heine.
