= David Kabua =

President of the Marshall Islands from 2020 to 2024

The Honorable David Kabua
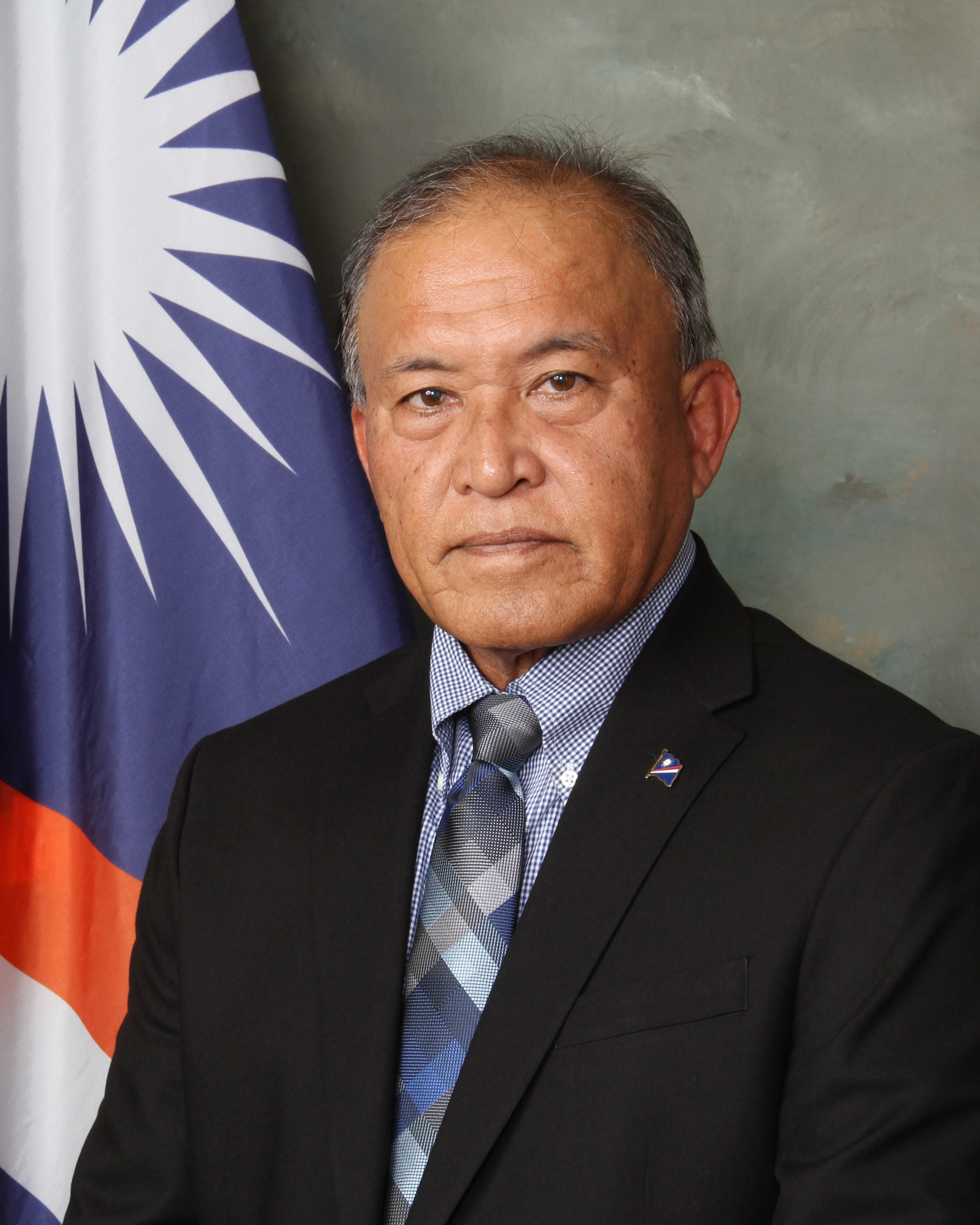
- Kabua in 2021

9th President of the Marshall Islands
- In office 13 January 2020 – 3 January 2024
- Preceded by: Hilda Heine
- Succeeded by: Hilda Heine

10th Minister in Assistance to the President
- In office 11 January 2016 – 28 January 2016
- President: Casten Nemra
- Preceded by: Wilbur Heine
- Succeeded by: Mattlan Zackhras

Personal details
- Born: 26 May 1951 Majuro, Trust Territory of the Pacific Islands (now Marshall; Islands)
- Died: 8 April 2026 (aged 74) Honolulu, Hawaii, U.S.
- Party: Independent
- Spouse: Ginger Kabua
- Children: 3
- Parents: Amata Kabua; Emlain Kabua

David Kabua (26 May 1951 – 8 April 2026) was a Marshallese politician who served as President of the Marshall Islands from 2020 to 2024. He represented Wotho Atoll in the Legislature of the Marshall Islands since 2008 and served terms as Minister of Health and Internal Affairs.

== Early life ==
Kabua was born in Majuro on 26 May 1951, as the fourth child and second son of the first President of the Marshall Islands, Amata Kabua, and his wife, former First Lady Emlain Kabua. Kabua graduated from Xavier High School in Chuuk State, Federated States of Micronesia in 1971, and later studied at the University of Hawaii in Manoa. Kabua subsequently worked as teacher aide, student liaison officer and general manager of the Marshall Islands Development Authority. He was the consul general of the Marshall Islands in Orange County, California, United States, for four years. He also worked as a private business owner for a decade.

== Political career ==
In the 2007 Marshallese general election Kabua was elected to the Legislature of the Marshall Islands for Wotho Atoll for the first time. He was re-elected in the 2011 Marshallese general election. During his second term he served as Minister of Health from 2012 and 2013 and in 2014 he was made Minister of Internal Affairs in a cabinet reshuffle. He was once again elected in the 2015 Marshallese general election. He was Minister in Assistance to the President of Marshall Islands in the cabinet of Casten Nemra in January 2016.

During the 2019 Marshallese general election he was re-elected for Wotho Atoll with 120 votes. On 6 January 2020 Kabua was elected President of the Marshall Islands by the national legislature by a vote of 20–12 with one abstention. He succeeded Hilda Heine, who was seeking a second term, but lost in the first session vote. Kabua said that combating climate change, negotiating with the US regarding the extension of a funding arrangement that expires in 2024 and addressing the issue of Runit Dome as the top priorities of his presidency. Meaghan Tobin, writing for the South China Morning Post described Kabua as a moderate politician who would continue the country's relationship with Taiwan.

In September 2020, in the lead up to the 75th General Assembly of the United Nations Kabua wrote a public letter to The Guardian in which he warned about the risks of climate change to his country, stating that his country could disappear.

On 3 January 2024 Hilda Heine took over the presidency from Kabua.

== Cabinet ==
Kabua and his cabinet were sworn into office by Chief Justice Carl Ingram of the High Court of the Marshall Islands on 13 January 2020.

Ministry	Minister	Period
Minister in Assistance to the President and of Environment	Christopher Loeak	13 January 2020
Minister of Foreign Affairs and Trade	Casten Nemra	13 January 2020
Minister of Health and Human Services	Bruce Bilimon	13 January 2020
Minister of Finance, Banking and Postal Service	Alfred Alfred Jr.	13 January 2020
Minister of Transportation, Communication and Information Technology	Donald Capelle	13 January 2020
Minister of Works, Infrastructure and Utilities	Jiba Kabua	13 January 2020
Minister of Justice, Immigration and Labor	Kessai Note	13 January 2020
Minister of Culture and Internal Affairs	Jemi Nashion	13 January 2020
Minister of Education, Sports and Training	Kitlang Kabua	13 January 2020
Minister of Natural Resources and Commerce	Sandy Alfred	13 January 2020

== Personal life and death ==
Kabua was married to Ginger Kabua until his death. They had three children.

Kabua died from cancer in Honolulu on 8 April 2026, at the age of 74.

Political offices
Preceded by Hilda Heine	President of the Marshall Islands; 2020–2024	Succeeded by Hilda Heine
