= Atbi Riklon =

Marshallese politician

Honorable Atbi A. Riklon

Senator for Ujae Atoll in Nitijela

Personal details
- Party: Independent

Atbi A. Riklon is a Marshallese politician serving Ujae Atoll in Nitijela. He was elected in the 2019 election with 190 votes against opponent Waylon Muller who received 96 votes. He also was elected Iroijlaplap in the 2017 Marshallese Constitutional Convention election. He was briefly Minister of Justice in 2016.
