= High Court of the Marshall Islands =

- Seal of the court
- Jurisdiction: Marshall Islands
- Composition method: Recommendation of Judicial Service Commission, Appointment by Cabinet, and Approval of Nitijela
- Authorised by: Constitution of the Marshall Islands
- Appeals to: Supreme Court of the Marshall Islands
- Judge term length: Citizens During Good Behavior Up to Age 72; Noncitizens During Good Behavior for Term of 1 Year or More
- Number of positions: 1 Chief Justice and Optional (Currently 2) Associate Justices
- Website: http://rmicourts.org/

Chief Justice
- Currently: Carl Ingram
- Since: 2013
- Lead position ends: 2023

The High Court is the second highest court of law in the Marshall Islands judiciary. The court is established by Article VI, section 3 of the republic's constitution. It has appellate jurisdiction over cases originating in the lower courts as well as original jurisdiction over certain classes of cases, including some criminal and civil matters, wills, and divorces. The court consists of a Chief Justice and an optional number of Associate Justices. The current Chief Justice, Carl Ingram, a U.S. citizen who originally came to the Marshall Islands with the Peace Corps in 1979, was first appointed as an associate justice of the High Court in March 2003, then as chief justice in October 2003 and for a second 10-year term as chief justice effective October 2013.

== Chief Justices ==
Name	Took office	Left office	Notes
John Lanham	October 1981	March 1985	
Nelson Doi	March 1985	April 1986	
Adhikarana D. Tennekone	April 1986	1989	
Philip T. Bird	1989	1991	
Neil Rutledge	June 1992	1993-?	
Witten Philippo	?-1994	1995-?	acting
Daniel Cadra	April 1996	June 1999	
Charles Henry	2001	2002	
Carl Ingram	October 2003	Incumbent	
