= Christopher Loeak =

President of the Marshall Islands from 2012 to 2016

His Highness His Excellency Iroijlaplap Christopher Loeak
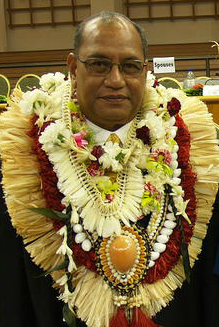
- Loeak in 2012

6th President of the Marshall Islands
- In office 10 January 2012 – 11 January 2016
- Preceded by: Jurelang Zedkaia
- Succeeded by: Casten Nemra

Iroijlaplap of Ailinglaplap
- In office 4 September 2021 – 8 August 2025
- Preceded by: Kotak Litokwa Loeak
- Succeeded by: Vacant

Minister in Assistance to the President
- In office January 2020 – January 2024
- President: David Kabua
- Preceded by: David Paul
- Succeeded by: Bremity Lakjohn
- In office January 2008 – September 2009
- President: Litokwa Tomeing
- Preceded by: Tadashi Lometo
- Succeeded by: Ruben Zackhras
- In office 1999 – January 2000
- President: Imata Kabua
- Preceded by: Johnsay Riklon
- Succeeded by: Gerald Zackios

Personal details
- Born: Christopher Jorebon Loeak; 11 November 1952 Ailinglaplap Atoll, Trust Territory of the Pacific Islands
- Died: 8 August 2025 (aged 72) Honolulu, Hawaii, U.S.
- Party: Independent
- Spouse: Lieom Anono Loeak
- Children: 3
- Education: Hawaii Pacific University; Gonzaga University School of Law (J.D.)

Iroijlaplap Christopher Jorebon Loeak /ˈlɔɪˌæk/ (11 November 1952 – 8 August 2025) was a Marshallese politician who was the President of the Marshall Islands from 2012 to 2016. He was elected by parliament as President in January 2012, following the 2011 general election.

== Background ==
Loeak was born on the Ailinglaplap Atoll on 11 November 1952. He attended Marshall Islands High School before traveling to the United States to study at the Hawaii Pacific College and Gonzaga University School of Law. Loeak was a native speaker of Marshallese and also spoke English. He was married to Anono Lieom Loeak and had three children, along with eight grandchildren.

Loeak died in Honolulu under medical care on 8 August 2025, at the age of 72.

== Political career ==
Loeak was first elected to the Nitijela in 1985 when he represented the Ailinglaplap Atoll. He served in the cabinet of President Amata Kabua as Minister of Justice from 1988 to 1992. He became Minister of Social Services in 1992 and held that post until 1996 when Kunio Lemari became acting president on the death of Kabua and Loeak became Minister of Education. He held the education portfolio for two years, continuing his cabinet work under President Imata Kabua who was sworn in during 1997. Kabua made him Minister for the Ralik Chain of islands in 1998, holding that position for a year and also undertaking an additional portfolio as Minister-in-Assistance to the President in 1999.

During his time in the Nitijela Loeak took an active part in many of its committees including those for the Judiciary and Government Relations; Public Account, Health and Education and Social Services (which he chaired); Foreign Affairs and Trade; Appropriation; Resource and Development; International Protection, Peace, Security and Protection of the Environment. He was also a member of the Second and Third Constitutional Conventions, serving as vice-president of the latter, and chaired the Bill of Rights Committee. Loeak was part of the team that negotiated the extension of the United States lease of the Marshallese part of the Ronald Reagan Ballistic Missile Defense Test Site after an eight-year deadlock on talks. The Marshall Islands government agreed to accept payment of $32 million in return for extending the lease on the site.

Loeak was re-elected to the Nitijela in 2007 and continued to hold the seat of Ailinglaplap afterwards. He re-entered the cabinet in 2008 as Minister-in-Assistance to President Litokwa Tomeing.

=== Presidency ===
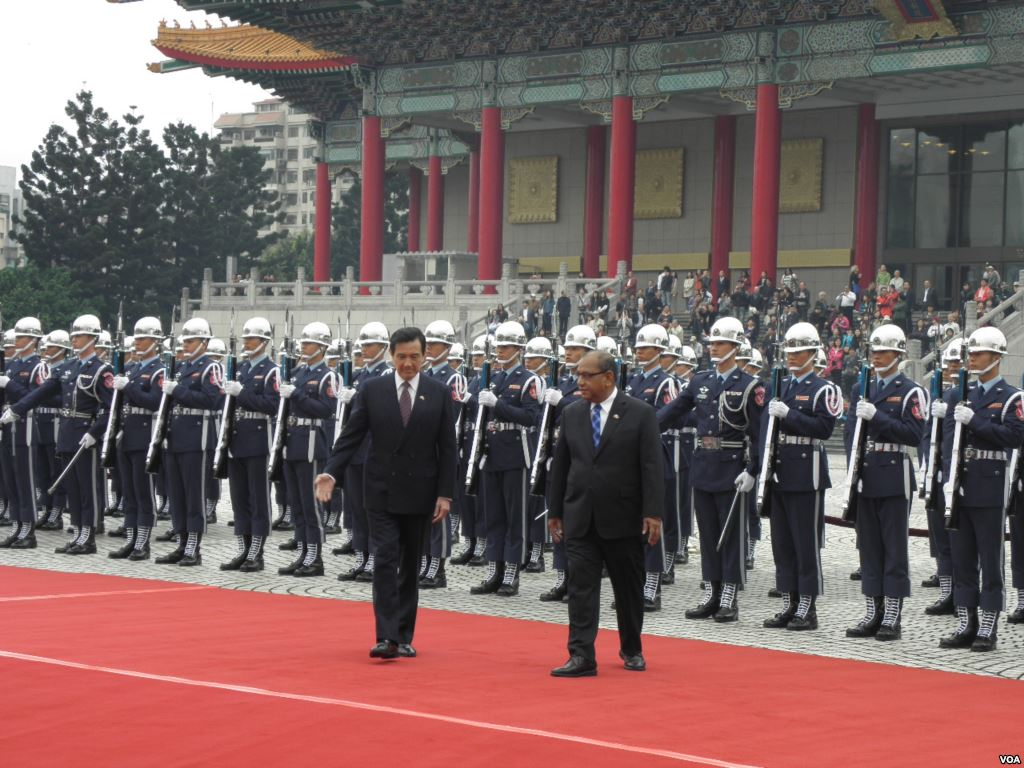
Loeak visiting the Taiwanese President Ma Ying-jeou at Chiang Kai-shek Memorial Hall in 2013

Loeak became president of the Marshall Islands in January 2012 when the Nitijela elected him to that post. Loeak was elected as presidential candidate by default when former President Kessai Note refused to elect Aelon Kein Ad chosen nominee Tony Debrum who had won the primary. Loeak was thus chosen as second choice to keep the majority. Loeak defeated incumbent president Jurelang Zedkaia by 21 votes to 11. Zedkaia agreed to co-operate with the new administration and Loeak was expected to name his cabinet and be sworn in within a week.

On 26 September 2013, Loeak made a speech to the General Debate of the 68th Session of the United Nations General Assembly and said:

Global efforts on climate change are falling short - and low-lying island nations such as mine are already paying the earliest costs of what is fast becoming a global crisis. In every sense, the world must build for future risks, and too often, we are still setting course for current conditions. It is the seas that are rising - not the islands that are sinking. I will not concede my own land or my nation; but nor will I rest until my fellow world leaders have signed onto to act, not just out of economic convenience, but out of a common responsibility of all to strive for upward momentum.

=== After the presidency ===
Loeak was appointed the Minister in Assistance to the President by President David Kabua in January 2020. On 4 September 2021, he succeeded to the throne of Ailinglaplap, becoming the new Iroijlaplap following the death of Kotak Litokwa Loeak.

Political offices
| Preceded by Jurelang Zedkaia | President of the Marshall Islands; 2012–2016 | Succeeded by Casten Nemra |
Regnal titles
| Preceded by Kotak Litokwa Loeak | Iroijlaplap of Ailinglaplap; 2021–2025 | Succeeded by Vacant |
