= Hilda Heine =

President of the Marshall Islands (2016–2020; 2024–present)

Her Excellency Hilda Heine
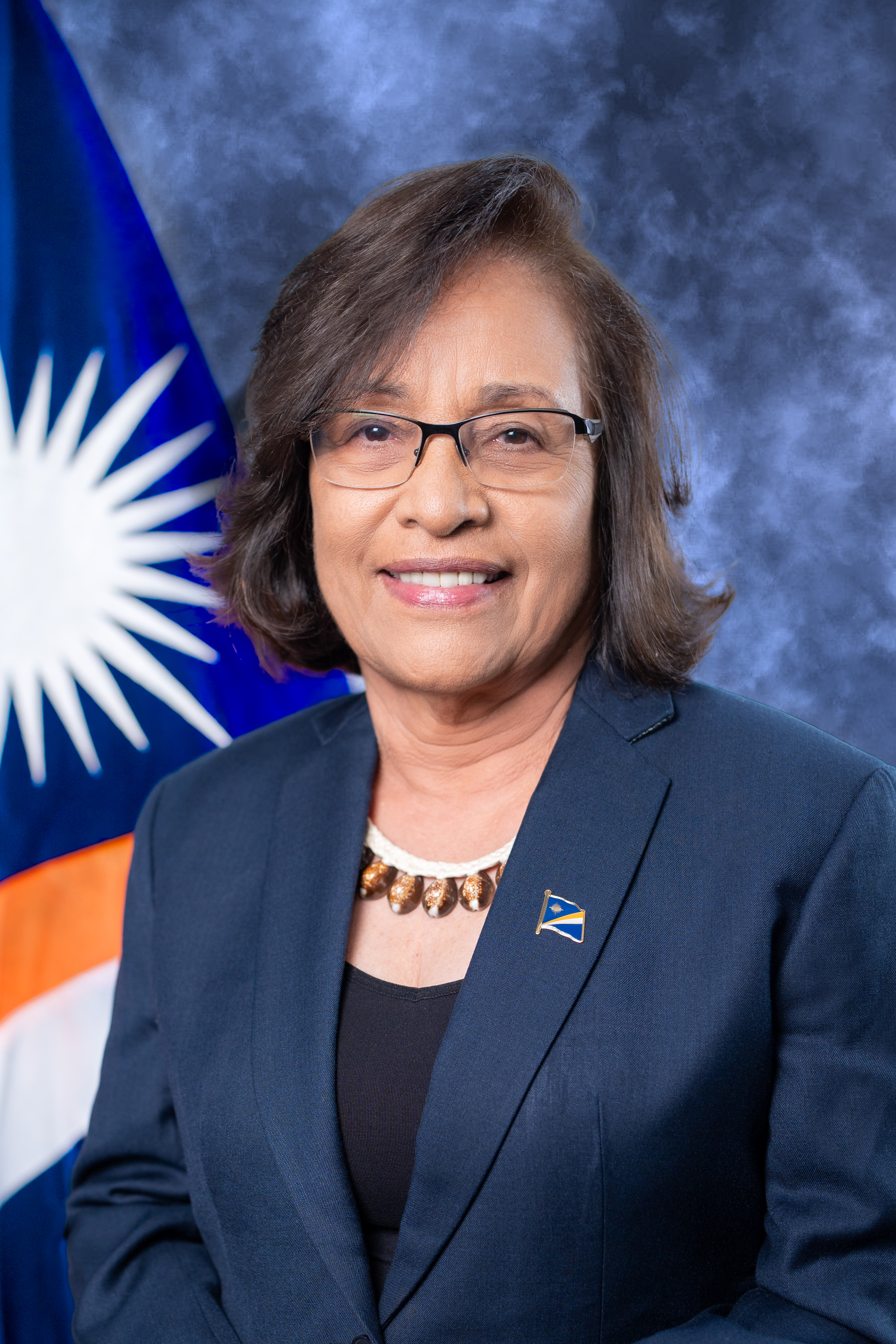
- Official portrait, 2024

8th and 10th President of the Marshall Islands
- Incumbent
- Assumed office 3 January 2024
- Preceded by: David Kabua
- In office 28 January 2016 – 13 January 2020
- Preceded by: Casten Nemra
- Succeeded by: David Kabua

Personal details
- Born: Hilda Cathy Heine; 6 April 1951 (age 75) Jaluit Atoll, Trust Territory of the Pacific Islands (now Marshall Islands)
- Party: Independent
- Spouse: Thomas Kijiner Jr
- Relations: Carl Heine (grandfather)
- Children: Kathy Jetn̄il-Kijiner
- Education: University of Oregon (BA); University of Hawaii, Manoa (MA); University of Southern California (EdD)

Hilda Cathy Heine (born 6 April 1951) is a Marshallese educator and politician. She has served as the president of the Marshall Islands since 2024, having previously served from 2016 to 2020. Heine was the first woman to lead any sovereign country in Micronesia and the first person from the Marshall Islands to earn a doctorate. Prior to entering politics, she worked as a teacher and counselor at Marshall Islands High School and then as a women's rights activist with her organization Women United Together Marshall Islands.

Heine's political career began when she was elected to the Nitijeļā in 2011 and appointed Minister of Education. The legislature selected her for the presidency two weeks into the session in January 2016 after a motion of no confidence removed her predecessor, Casten Nemra. Her defection to the opposition alongside her two sons, also legislators, was pivotal in Nemra's removal. After becoming president, Heine became active in the international politics surrounding climate change. She survived a motion of no confidence in 2018 following a dispute regarding the designation of Rongelap Atoll, with later investigation determining that some of her opponents in this motion had been bribed by developers who wished to use the atoll.

Heine was removed from the presidency in January 2020 when the legislature voted in favor of David Kabua. Over the following years she served as a board member of the East–West Center and pro-chancellor of the University of the South Pacific in addition to her role as a legislator. Heine returned to the presidency in 2024 after defeating Kabua in the selection process.

== Early life and family ==
Hilda Cathy Heine was born in Jaluit Atoll on 6 April 1951. She attended college in the United States where she earned her undergraduate degree at the University of Oregon in 1970. She earned a master's degree at the University of Hawaiʻi at Mānoa in 1975 and an educational doctorate at the University of Southern California in 2004. Heine was the first person from the Marshall Islands to get a doctorate.

Heine's family had a history of involvement in politics and activism. Her brother Carl Heine was the opposition leader during his tenure in the Nitijeļā, and her cousin Dwight Heine was the first person from the Marshall Islands to serve as the Trust Territory of the Pacific Islands District Commissioner as well as the first person to voice opposition to nuclear testing around the Marshall Islands. Her grandfather, Carl Heine, was an Australian-born Congregationalist missionary who married a Marshallese woman and was executed by the Japanese during World War II. Her grandmother was Nenij Heine, namesake of the Nenij Heine scholarship. Her brother Clyde Heine was a businessman, operating Majuro Stevedore & Terminal Company. Heine is married to Thomas Kijiner Jr, and her daughter is the poet and activist Kathy Jetn̄il-Kijiner. Heine's cousins Wilbur Heine and Thomas Heine have been elected to the Legislature and have held cabinet positions.

Heine worked as a teacher at Marshall Islands High School in Majuro from 1975 to 1980, and then as a school counselor until 1982. She was president of the College of the Marshall Islands from 1990 to 1992. She then served as secretary of education in Majuro's education ministry from 1993 to 1995. Between 1995 and 2012, Heine worked in various positions for Pacific Resources for Education and Learning (PREL) in Hawaii. She became a researcher with the group in 2001, was promoted to director for policy and capacity building in 2004, and then became its Pacific Comprehensive Assistance Center's program director in 2006, holding the latter position until 2012.

Heine was one of the Western-educated women who co-founded the women's organization Jined Ilo Kobo and its successor Women United Together Marshall Islands (WUTMI). As a member of WUTMI, she called on President Jurelang Zedkaia to establish a task force on domestic violence. She was also a member of the Teacher Standards and Licensing Board, the Commission on Education in Micronesia, and the Human Resources in Health Task Force.

== Political career ==
=== Minister of education ===
Heine first became a member of the Nitijeļā representing Aur Atoll in the 2011 general election, winning an open seat. She was the only female candidate to be elected in 2011. President Litokwa Tomeing appointed her minister of education when forming his government. In 2014, Heine called for an annual increase of five percent improvement in testing scores. Heine initiated the Pacific Masters in Education (PACMED) program between the University of Hawaiʻi at Mānoa and the University of the South Pacific, which was implemented in 2017. She taught one of the involved classes, covering education in the context of climate change politics.

=== 2016 selection as president ===
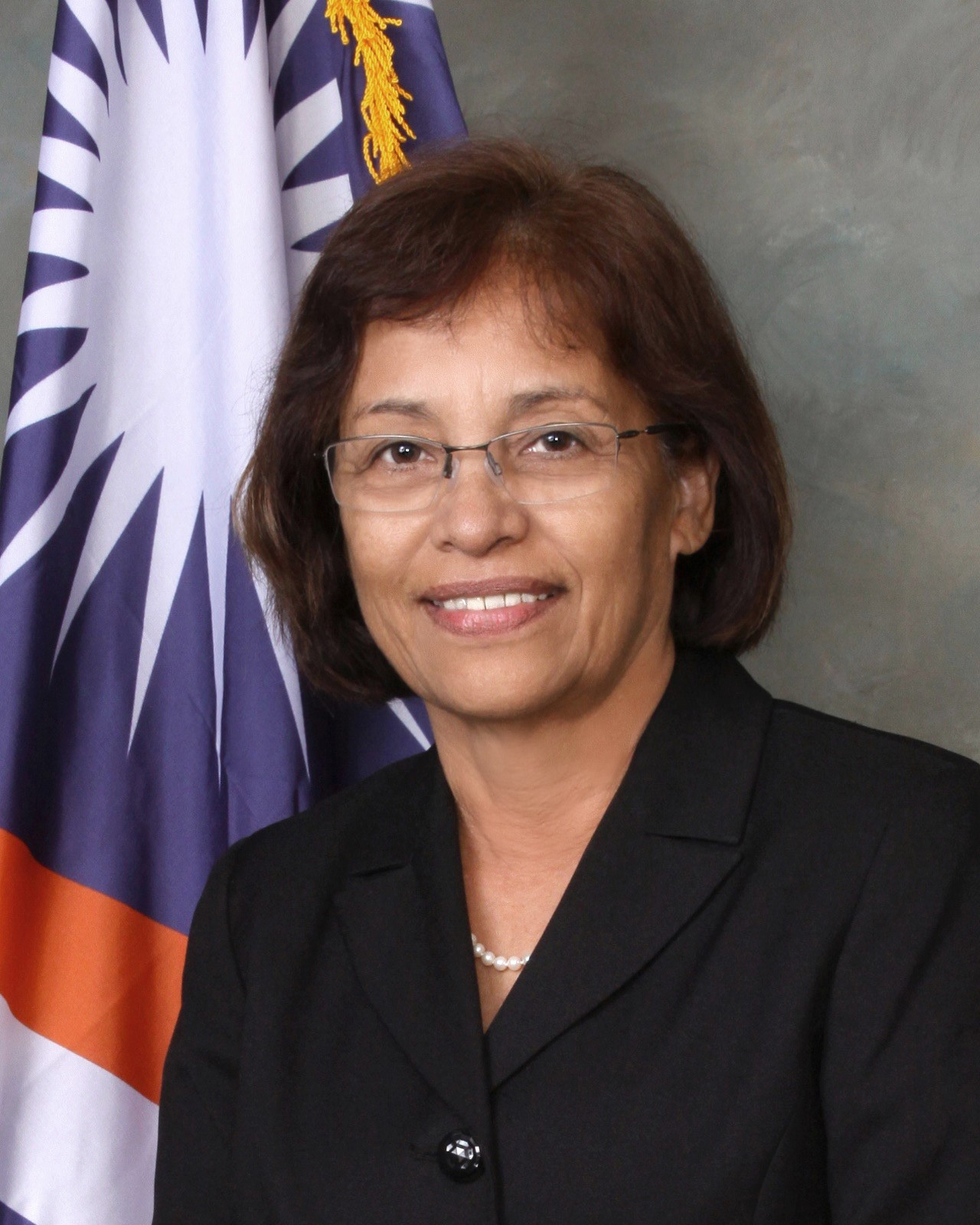
Heine in 2016

Heine was reelected in the 2015 general election as one of three women sent to the legislature. Casten Nemra formed a coalition to became President of the Marshall Islands on 4 January, being selected by the legislature with a margin of one vote. With her doctorate in education, it was expected that Nemra would retain her as Minister of Education. Nemra had offered Heine the position, but she declined. Both she and Wilbur Heine rejected ministry positions because Thomas Heine had not received any offer. She later said that she did not want to serve in Nemra's ministry because he gave preference to "prominent traditional leaders" over the rest of the coalition that elected him. The three legislators of the Heine family refused to attend Nemra's inauguration and defected to the opposition, where Hilda Heine effectively became the opposition leader.

A motion of no confidence was raised on 26 January, and Nemra was removed from the presidency. The legislature reconvened the next day to select a new president. Heine formed her own coalition, primarily through her relatives and other people with whom she had close relationships. Of the 30 members of the Nitijeļā, 24 voted for Heine, and the remaining 6 abstained. Heine was sworn into office as President of the Marshall Islands on 28 January 2016.

Heine was the first female president of the Marshall Islands, and the first woman to lead any sovereign Pacific island country. Because of this, she was dubbed the "mother of the nation". Heine felt that being a woman gave her an advantage when the new president was selected, as it gave her the image of a safer, less argumentative choice than a man, but she also believed she was under greater pressure as the first female president. Heine was one of few presidents who did not hold a chiefly title; the presidency was typically associated with chieftainship, which had supported Nemra's presidency. Given the suddenness of her promotion, she felt that she had insufficient time to prepare for the presidency.

=== First presidency ===
When forming her cabinet, Heine appointed Alfred Alfred Jr. as Minister of Resources and Development, Mike Halferty as Minister of Transportation and Communication, Thomas Heine as Minister of Justice, Wilbur Heine as Minister of Education, Kalani Kaneko as Minister of Health, Amenta Matthew as Minister of Internal Affairs, Tony Muller as Minister of Public Works, John Silk as Minister of Foreign Affairs, Brenson S. Wase as Minister of Finance, Mattlan Zackhras as Minister in Assistance. Heine did not retain any members of Nemra's cabinet except for Halferty, who had resigned days before Nemra's government was dissolved. David Paul had been her first choice for minister of finance, but he declined; he later became Minister in Assistance in November 2017. Alfred Alfred Jr. resigned in January 2018. Mike Halferty and Thomas Heine later traded their positions, and Halferty was eventually relieved by President Heine in favor of Jack Ading on 28 June 2018.

Heine implemented a policy within her government that issues were to be addressed by the cabinet collectively instead of unilaterally by individual ministers, and that decisions were to be made based on data instead of social pressure. In the first year of her presidency, Heine introduced her governing program, Agenda 2020: A Framework for Progress. Because of the nation's lack of political parties, this acted as a unifying platform for the cabinet. Heine was reluctant to make changes in her personal life after assuming the presidency. She accepted that she would be routinely accompanied by bodyguards and that her husband would have to do their shopping, but she chose not to move to a different house or drive a government car.

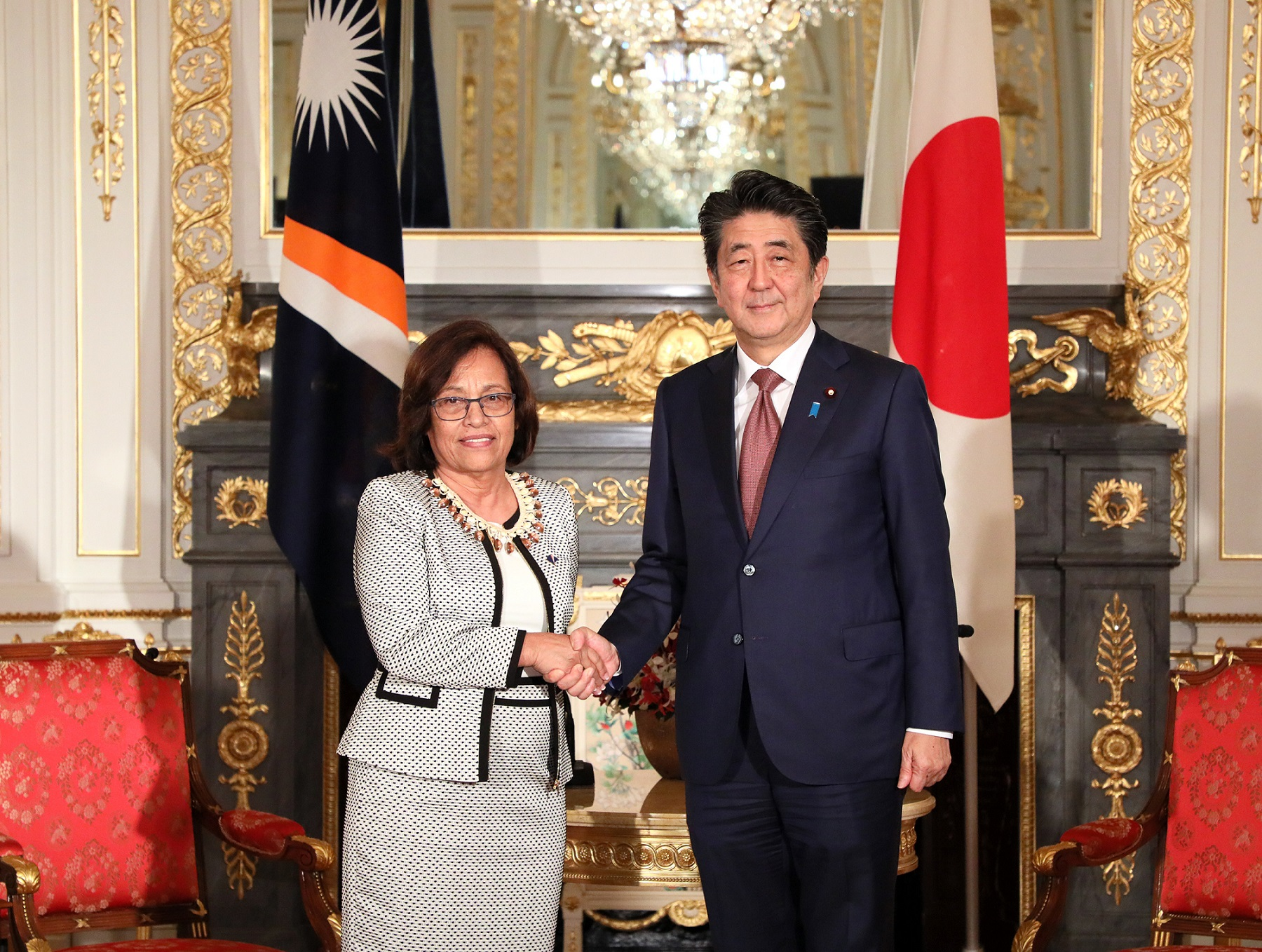
Heine with Japanese Prime Minister Shinzo Abe in 2019

When the first case of Zika virus in the Marshall Islands during the 2015–16 Zika virus epidemic was confirmed, Heine declare a state of health emergency. By April 2016, the Marshall Islands faced a severe drought, prompting Heine to declare a state of disaster. Heine was involved in the creation of the Pacific Women Leaders Coalition in 2017 as a means for female politicians in the region to collaborate on gender issues and other causes. She supported the creation of the government-sponsored Miss Marshall Islands pageant, believing it to be a path for women to adopt leadership positions. She also implemented a program to provide small business loans for women. Heine had the National Nuclear Commission created in 2017. Following a 2017 Marshallese study that found a correlation between poverty and stunted growth in children, Heine successfully requested funding for a childhood development program from the World Bank. The program launched in 2022, after her presidency ended. In May 2018, Heine signed an air transport agreement with Papua New Guinea.

A dispute in the legislature arose in 2018 regarding whether Rongelap Atoll should be designated as a special administrative region. Heine opposed the proposal, considering it to be unconstitutional. This led to a motion of no confidence in Heine's government, which she blamed on Chinese influence. On 12 November 2018, she survived the motion with the outcome in votes being 16–16, falling short of the 17 votes needed. A later investigation by the United States government found that two prospective investors had bribed several officials to support the motion, and that its failure prompted discussion of "revenge".

Heine was Chancellor of the University of the South Pacific (USP) from 1 July 2019 to 12 January 2020. She negotiated the Kora fund with Taiwanese president Tsai Ing-wen in 2019 in which Taiwan funds women's businesses in the Marshall Islands. Heine was president during the 2019–2020 dengue fever epidemic, and she issued a state of health emergency on 6 August 2019. She supported the decision to abolish non-resident citizen voting in the 2019 election, arguing that without structure, it would let people rig the votes.

=== Between presidencies ===
Heine was reelected to the Nitijeļā in the 2019 general election, winning a close race against a challenger, Justin Lani. Along with Kitlang Kabua, she was one of only two women elected to the legislature that year. Many of Heine's allies were unsuccessful in their reelection campaigns, losing her the support she needed in order to maintain her government. On 6 January 2020, she lost her bid for re-election to David Kabua in a 12–20 vote. She was critical of how Kabua handled renegotiation of the Compact of Free Association with the United States, leading a group who accused him of rushing the process and failing to adequately address climate change and the history of American nuclear testing on the islands.

The East–West Center elected Heine to its board as one of five international members in May 2021. On 12 November 2021, the USP Council elected her as Pro-Chancellor and Chair of Council for a three-year term, beginning 1 January 2022. She chaired her first council, the 93rd Council, the following May. Heine served as an advisor for the 2023 United Nations Climate Change Conference but resigned on the first day after reports surfaced that conference president Sultan Al Jaber would use the conference to make oil and gas deals.

When the COVID-19 pandemic first affected the Marshall Islands in August 2022, Heine proposed repurposing school buses for public transportation to counter higher taxi fares, eliminating the $5.00 hospital fee, reducing medicine prices, and providing free shipping transportation between islands for citizens.

=== Second presidency ===
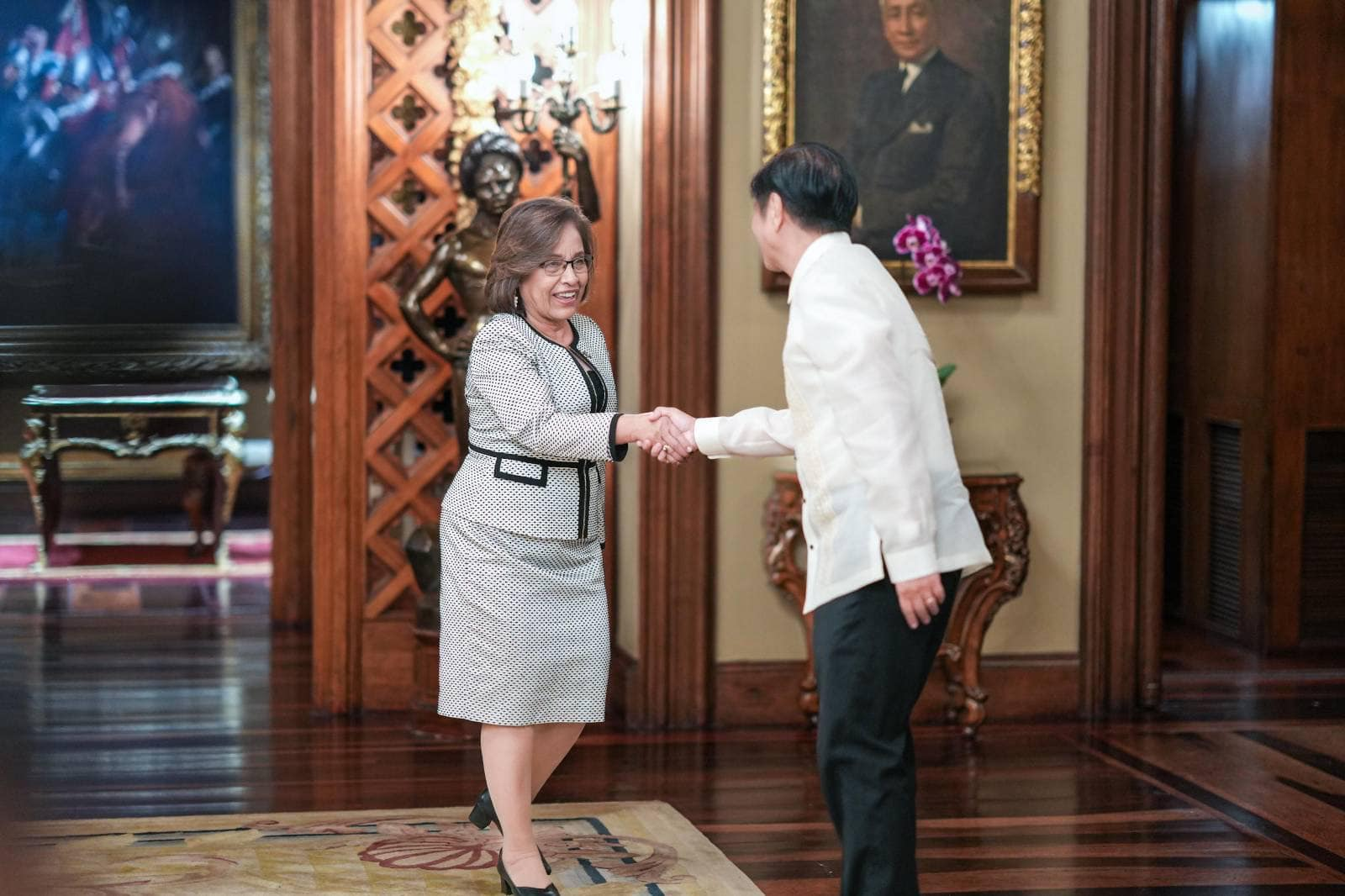
Heine with Philippine President Bongbong Marcos in 2024

Heine was reelected to the Nitijeļā in the 2023 general election. The presidential selection took place on 2 January, where she defeated Kabua, receiving 17 votes against his 16. She was sworn in the following day. The slimmer majority presented a more challenging environment for Heine to enact policy compared to her inauguration in 2016. In response, she included several of Kabua's supporters when forming her new cabinet on 9 January.

Creating her new cabinet, Heine appointed Joe Bejang as Minister of Education, Jess Gasper Jr. as Minister of Culture and Internal Affairs, Thomas Heine as Minister of Public Works, Kalani Kaneko as Minister of Foreign Affairs, Hilton Tonton Kendall as Minister of Transportation and Communications, Ota Kisino as Minister of Health, Bremity Lakjohn as Minister in Assistance, Tony Muller as Minister of Natural Resources and Commerce, David Paul as Minister of Finance, and Wisely Zackhras as Minister of Justice. Ministers Heine, Kaneko, Muller, Muller, and Paul had served in President Heine's cabinet during her first term. She appointed David Anitok as Presidential Envoy for Nuclear Justice and Human Rights.

After her inauguration, Heine declared that energy was her first priority for her next term. She began her second term by declaring two states of emergency. The first was in regard to limited food and fuel on Kili Island, which had been depleted following the bankruptcy of the Bikini Resettlement Trust Fund. The second was in response to an energy crisis in Majuro as Marshalls Energy Company failed to provide consistent power. She also continued the Marshall Islands' negotiations with the United States regarding the Compact of Free Association (COFA). Over the following months, Heine toured the Marshallese populations that faced lasting effects from 20th century nuclear testing conducted by the United States.

On 12 March 2025, Heine joined the Advisory Board of the Global Center on Adaptation.

== Policies and political views ==
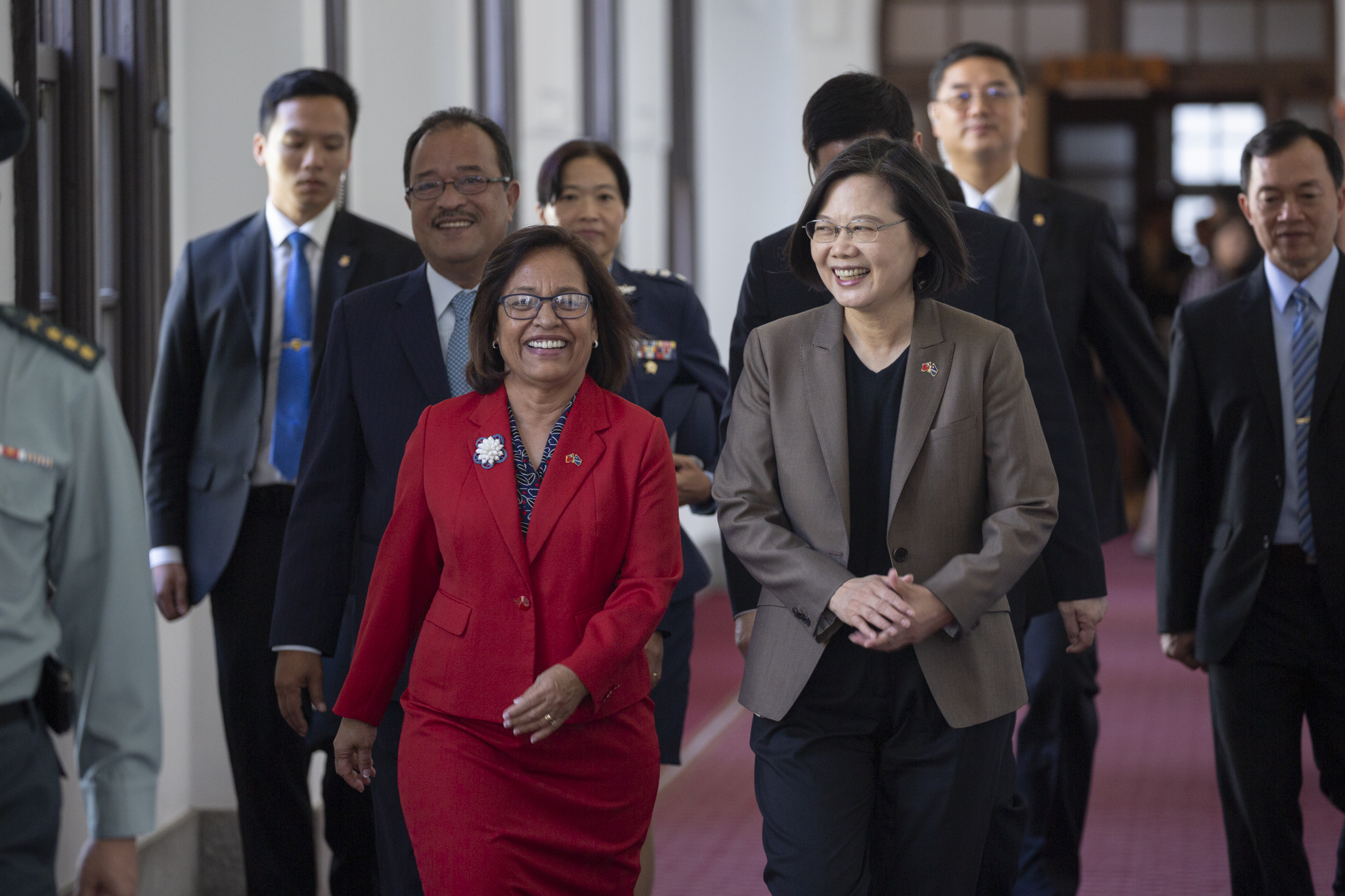
Heine with Taiwanese President Tsai Ing-wen in 2019

Heine has been one of the most active figures in the international politics of climate change and its effects on small island countries, working alongside her daughter Kathy Jetn̄il-Kijiner, a climate activist. Heine has expressed concern that coastal erosion poses a national security risk for the Marshall Islands. She rejects overseas relocation programs for Marshallese citizens affected by climate change and has criticized the media for its "drowning Pacific Islands" messaging. She instead supports measures to raise the islands higher above sea level. Heine argues that climate justice and gender equality are interlinked. During her first term as president, she put forward a plan to make the nation carbon neutral by 2025. Heine opposes deep sea mining and advocates for marine preservation. In her first term, Heine called for the end of illegal fishing around Pacific Island nations by 2023. On nuclear safety, Heine believes that the United States should be accountable for its nuclear testing around the Marshall Islands during the 1940s and 1950s. She opposed the discharge of radioactive water from the Fukushima nuclear accident into the Pacific Ocean.

Heine expressed frustration with the state of Marshall Islands–United States relations following delays in American funding for COFA in 2024, saying that the U.S. was "gradually destroying" its relations with the COFA nations and that the Marshall Islands was "at the crossroads" in its relationship with the United States. She described the tense relations between China and the United States as "really helpful to the cause of the Marshall Islands" as it incentivizes the United States to give additional support to Pacific Island nations. She supports greater inclusion of Taiwan in activities of the United Nations. Heine has expressed "solidarity with Ukraine" in the Russo-Ukrainian War, describing Ukraine as fighting for its existence and likening this to the experience of Pacific Island nations. In response to high travel prices to and from Micronesia, Heine has suggested that leaders in the region "break up the United Airlines monopoly".

Heine considers violence against women to be one of the most pressing issues in the Marshall Islands and advocates the creation of safe houses for victims to stay. She supports increasing resources for schools, including higher teacher salaries and support for private schools. Other issues she has said are priorities as of her second term include improving energy infrastructure, expanding health services, implementing desalination to improve the water supply, raising the minimum wage, protecting workplace equality for women, expanding the fishing industry, and promoting government transparency. Heine supports the implementation of universal basic income, saying that the country can "only do so much with wages".
