= Casten Nemra =

President of the Marshall Islands in 2016

His Excellency Casten Nemra
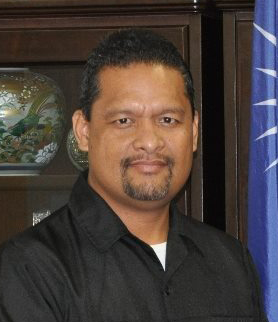
- Nemra in January 2016

Minister of Finance
- In office 29 June 2023 – January 2024
- President: David Kabua
- Preceded by: Brenson Wase
- Succeeded by: David Paul

Minister of Foreign Affairs
- In office 13 January 2020 – 2022
- President: David Kabua
- Preceded by: John Silk
- Succeeded by: Kitlang Kabua

7th President of the Marshall Islands
- In office 11 January 2016 – 28 January 2016
- Preceded by: Christopher Loeak
- Succeeded by: Hilda Heine

Personal details
- Born: 29 July 1971 (age 55) Kwajalein Atoll, Trust Territory of the Pacific Islands (now Marshall Islands)
- Party: Independent
- Spouse: Terry Paul Nemra
- Children: 4
- Education: Portland State University

Casten Ned Nemra (born July 29, 1971) is a Marshallese politician who was President of the Marshall Islands for 17 days in January 2016. He was elected by the Nitijeļā (Parliament) as President in January 2016, following the 2015 general election, narrowly defeating Senator Alvin Jacklick, a seven-term member of Parliament, by a 17–16 vote. He was the youngest person to hold the job and the second commoner. He was ousted by a vote of no confidence after just two weeks in office by the opposition for jumping ship and joining Iroij Mike Kabua's Aelon Kein Ad party along with Senators Dennis Momotaro and Daisy-Alik Momotaro.

== Early life and education ==
Nemra was born on July 29, 1971, in Ebeye, Kwajalein Atoll, Marshall Islands, which were part of the Trust Territory of the Pacific Islands at the time. He was educated at Assumption High School, a Roman Catholic school in Majuro. Nemra received a Bachelor of Business Administration from Portland State University in 2000.

== Career ==
Nemra served as the Budget Director for Office of International Development Assistance from 2001 to 2004. He then served as Assistant Secretary for the Ministry of Finance from 2004 to 2007. Nemra was next appointed the Chief Secretary of the Republic of the Marshall Islands from 2008 until 2015.

Nemra was elected as a Senator in the Nitijeļā in the 2015 general election, representing the Jaluit Atoll constituency in the Ralik Chain.

He was the foreign minister of the Marshall Islands from 2020 to 2022. As foreign minister, he highlighted that the Marshallese government and people "have no intention to relocate" or become climate refugees. He said in April 2021 that the Marshallese are on the islands to stay. He was appointed Minister of Finance in June 2023.

== Personal life ==
Nemra is married to Terry Paul Nemra, the former First Lady of the Marshall Islands. The couple have four children. A resident of Jaluit Atoll, Nemra speaks both English and Marshallese.

Political offices
Preceded by Christopher Loeak	President of the Marshall Islands; 2016	Succeeded by Hilda Heine
Preceded by John M. Silk	Minister of Foreign Affairs; 2020–present	Incumbent
