= Ministry of Education (Marshall Islands) =

Ministry of the Education

Agency overview
- Jurisdiction: Government of the Marshall Islands
- Minister responsible: Gerald Zackios

The Ministry of Education, or the MOE, is a government branch of the Marshall Islands which oversees and administers elementary and secondary education in the Marshall Islands. Post-secondary (university or technical schools) education is not a direct responsibility of the MOE, but such entities are required to report to the ministry. Its minister is appointed by the president of the Marshall Islands.

== Institutions ==
- Marshall Islands Public School System
- College of the Marshall Islands (CMI)
- National Vocational Training Institute (NVTI)
