= Hiroshi V. Yamamura =

Marshallese politician

Hiroshi V. Yamamura is a Marshallese politician and government minister.

== Political career ==
As of 2014 he was Minister of Public Works and Acting Minister of Resources and Development.
