= Thomas Heine =

Marshallese politician

Thomas Heine is a Marshallese politician and government minister.

He has had a term as Minister of Transportation and Communications, and in 2012 he was Minister of Justice. In 2012 he was elected to the Board of Directors of the Marshall Islands Legal Services Corporation, and as of 2014 he was Chairman of the Central Pacific Shipping Commission.

In 2015 he was elected to the Legislature of the Marshall Islands from Lae Atoll. In February 2016, he was appointed as minister of justice in the cabinet led by President Hilda Heine. Thomas is a cousin of Hilda Heine.
