= John Silk =

Marshallese lawyer and politician

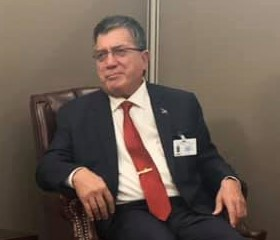
- Silk in 2019

Minister in Assistance to the President
- In office September 2017 – October 2017
- President: Hilda Heine
- Preceded by: Mattlan Zackhras
- Succeeded by: David Paul

Personal details
- Born: 15 September 1956 Kwajalein

John Silk (born 15 September 1956) is a Marshallese lawyer and politician who served as Minister of Foreign Affairs in the cabinet of President Hilda Heine.

He was born on 15 September 1956 in Kwajalein. He has worked as a lawyer.

Silk was elected to Nitijela (Marshall Islands parliament) from Kwajalein Atoll in 2000. He was eight years as minister of resources and development in the cabinet of Kessai Note from 2000 to 2007. He was appointed foreign minister in 2009. He was Minister in Assistance to the President from September 2017 following the death of Mattlan Zackhras to October 2017.
