= Compact of Free Association =

US-Micronesia-Marshall Islands-Palau agreements

Compacts of Free Association between the United States of America and the Freely Associated States
- Type: Bilateral international agreements (Free Association)
- Signed: FSM: October 1, 1982; RMI: June 25, 1983; Palau: January 10, 1986
- Effective: FSM: November 3, 1986; RMI: October 21, 1986; Palau: October 1, 1994
- Expiration: Indefinite (Economic terms renewed periodically; latest 2024–2043)
- Signatories: United States; Federated States of Micronesia; Marshall Islands; Palau
- Parties: United States; Federated States of Micronesia; Marshall Islands; Palau
- Ratifiers: United States Congress; Congress of the Federated States of Micronesia; Legislature of the Marshall Islands (Nitijeḷā); Olbiil Era Kelulau
- Depositary: Government of the United States of America
- Citations: Pub. L. 99-239 (FSM & RMI); Pub. L. 99-658 (Palau); Pub. L. 108-188 (2003 Amended); Pub. L. 118-42 (2024 Renewal)
- Language: English

Map of COFA nations: Palau, the Federated States of Micronesia, and the Republic of the Marshall Islands are in red; the United States is in blue

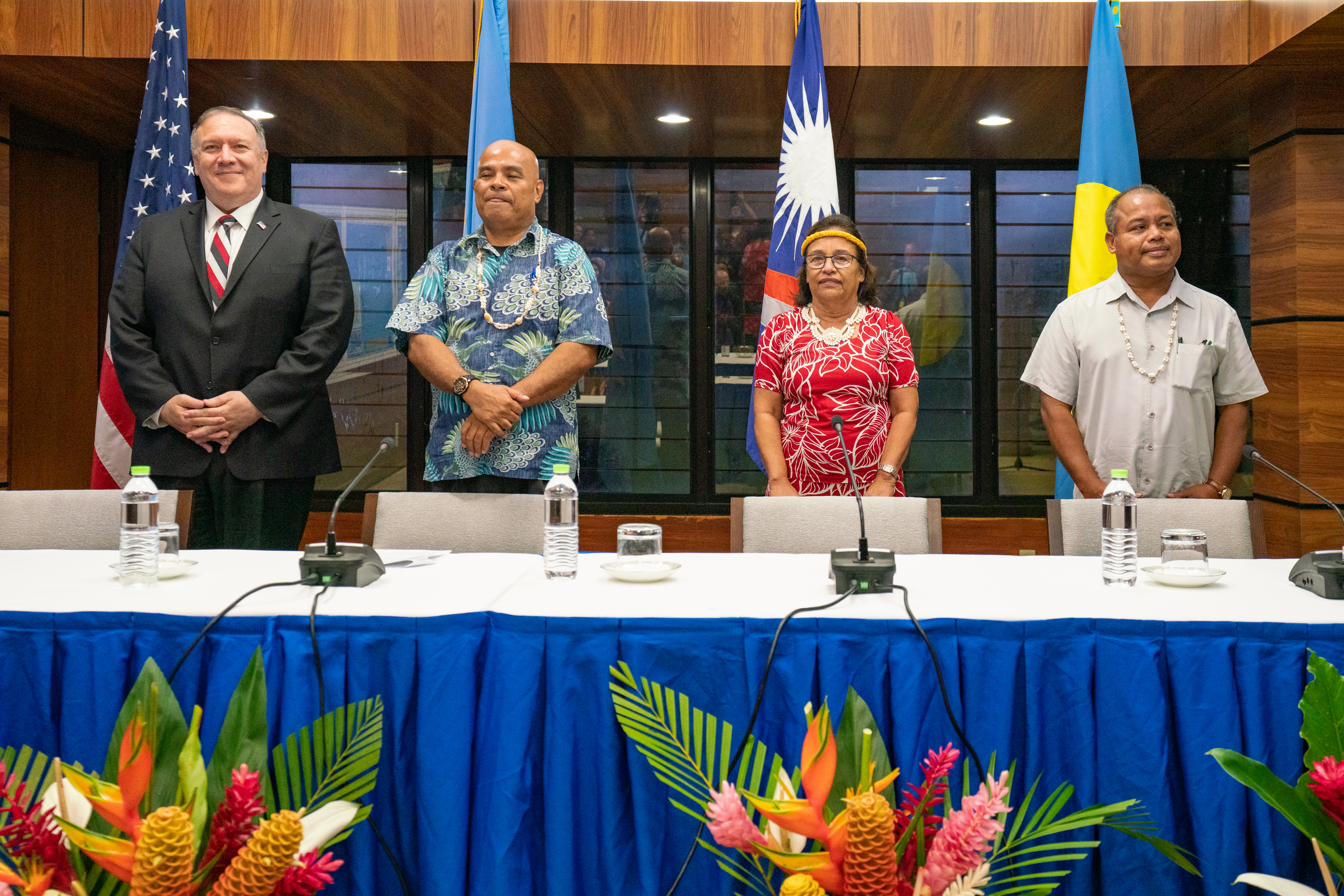
Representatives of the Compact states meeting in Kolonia, Micronesia, in August 2019. Left to right: U.S. secretary of state Mike Pompeo, Micronesian president David Panuelo, Marshallese president Hilda Heine, and Palauan vice president Raynold Oilouch

The Compacts of Free Association (COFA) are international agreements establishing and governing the relationships of free association between the United States and the three Pacific Island sovereign states: Federated States of Micronesia (FSM), the Republic of the Marshall Islands (RMI), and the Republic of Palau. As a result, these countries are sometimes known as the Freely Associated States (FASs). All three agreements next expire in 2043.

These countries, together with the Commonwealth of the Northern Mariana Islands, formerly constituted the Trust Territory of the Pacific Islands, a United Nations trusteeship administered by the United States Navy from 1947 to 1951, and by the U.S. Department of the Interior from 1951 to 1986 (to 1994 for Palau).

The compacts came into being as an extension of the US–UN territorial trusteeship agreement, which obliged the federal government of the United States "to promote the development of the people of the Trust Territory toward self-government or independence as appropriate to the particular circumstances of the Trust Territory and its peoples and the freely expressed wishes of the peoples concerned." Under the compacts, the U.S. federal government provides guaranteed financial assistance over a 15-year period administered through its Office of Insular Affairs in exchange for full international defense authority and responsibilities.

The Compacts of Free Association were initiated by negotiators in 1980, and signed by the parties in the years 1982 and 1983. They were approved by the citizens of the Pacific states in plebiscites held in 1983. Legislation on the compacts was adopted by the U.S. Congress in 1986, and signed into law on November 13, 1986.

== Associated states ==
Associated state	Associated since	Level of association	UN membership	Ref.
Marshall Islands	21 October 1986	United States provides defense, funding grants, and access to U.S. social services for citizens of these areas under the Compact of Free Association.	Yes	
Federated States of Micronesia	3 November 1986	United States provides defense, funding grants, and access to U.S. social services for citizens of these areas under the Compact of Free Association.	Yes	
Palau	1 October 1994	United States provides defense, funding grants, and access to U.S. social services for citizens of these areas under the Compact of Free Association.	Yes	

== Economic provisions ==
Each of the associated states actively participates in all Office of Insular Affairs technical assistance activities. The U.S. gives only these countries access to many U.S. domestic programs, including disaster response and recovery and hazard mitigation programs under the Federal Emergency Management Agency; some U.S. Department of Education programs, including the Pell Grant; and services provided by the National Weather Service, the United States Postal Service, the Federal Aviation Administration, the Federal Communications Commission, the Federal Deposit Insurance Corporation, and U.S. representation to the International Frequency Registration Board of the International Telecommunication Union. The Compact area, while outside the customs area of the United States, is mainly duty-free for imports.

Most citizens of the associated states may live and work in the United States, and most U.S. citizens and their spouses may live and work in the associated states. In 1996, the U.S. Personal Responsibility and Work Opportunity Act removed Medicaid benefits for those from the COFA states living in the US, even after the five-year waiting period that most other resident aliens have. However, in December 2020, Congress restored Medicaid for Compact of Free Association communities.

== Military provisions ==
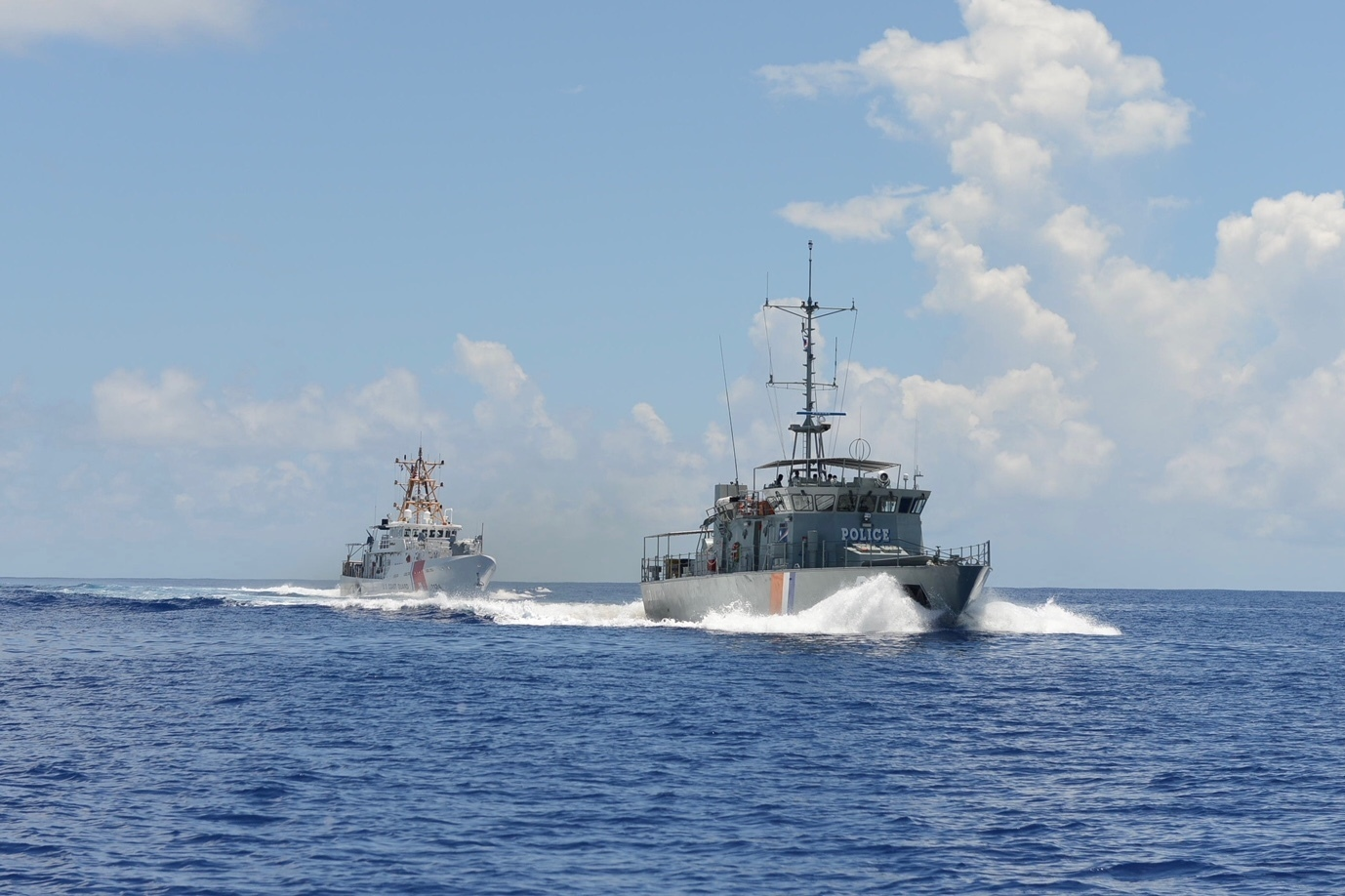
The USCGC Oliver Berry and the RMIS Lomor on a joint patrol

The COFA allows the United States to operate armed forces in Compact areas, and to demand land for operating bases, subject to negotiation, and excludes the militaries of other countries without U.S. permission. The U.S. in turn becomes responsible for protecting its affiliate countries, and responsible for administering all international defense treaties and affairs, though it may not declare war on their behalf.

The U.S. is not allowed to use nuclear, chemical, or biological weapons in Palauan territory. In the territories of the Marshall Islands and the Federated States of Micronesia, it is not allowed to store such weapons, except in times of national emergency, state of war, or when necessary to defend against an actual or impending attack on the U.S., the Marshall Islands, or the Federated States of Micronesia.

Citizens of the associated states may serve in America's armed forces, and there is a high level of military enlistment by Compact citizens. For example, in 2008, the Federated States of Micronesia had a higher per-capita enlistment rate than any U.S. state, and had more than five times the national per-capita average of casualties in Iraq and Afghanistan: nine soldiers out of a population of 107,000.

== 21st-century renewal and updates ==
=== 2003 renewal ===
In 2003, the compacts with the RMI and FSM were renewed for 20 years. These new compacts provided US$3.5 billion in funding for both countries. US$30 million was also be disbursed annually among American Samoa, Guam, Hawaii, and the Northern Mariana Islands in "Compact Impact" funding. This funding helped the governments of these localities cope with the expense of providing services to immigrants from the RMI, FSM, and Palau. The U.S. use of Kwajalein Atoll for missile testing was renewed for the same period. The new compacts also changed certain immigration rules. RMI and FSM citizens traveling to the U.S. are now required to have passports. The US Postal Service was given the option to apply international postage rates for mail between the U.S. and RMI/FSM, phased in over five years. The USPS began implementing the change in January 2006, but decided to resume domestic services and rates in November 2007.

The renewed compact, commonly called "Compact II," took effect for the FSM on June 25, 2004, and for RMI on June 30, 2004.

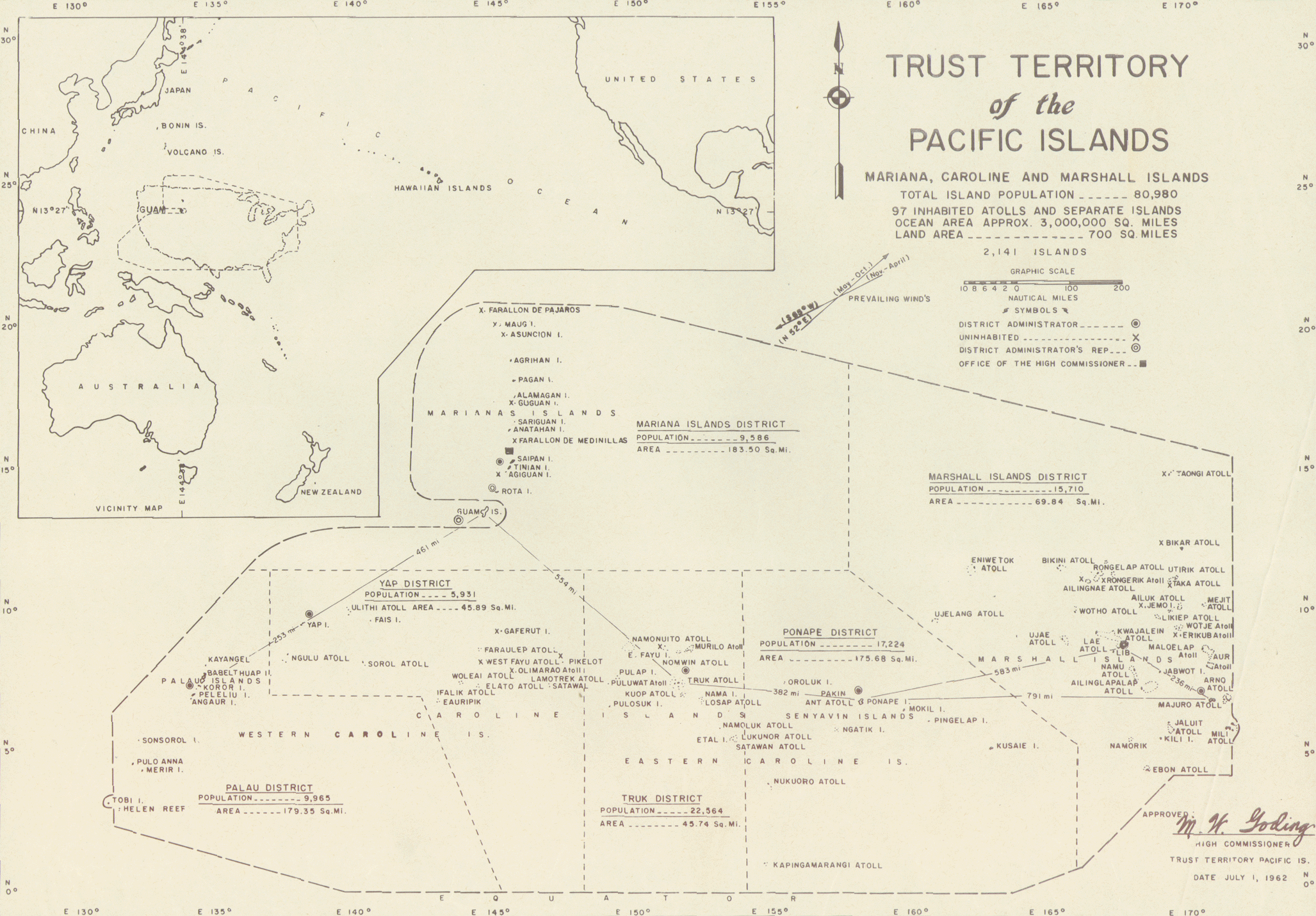
Map of the Trust Territory of the Pacific Islands (1962)

The economic provisions of the Compact for Palau, which provided $18 million in annual subsidies and grants, expired on September 30, 2009, and the renewal talk was concluded in late 2010. U.S. financial support for Palau is based on a continuing resolution passed by the U.S. Congress. The Compact Trust Fund set up to replace U.S. financial aid underperformed because of the Great Recession. The military and civil defense provisions remained until 2015.

An amended Compact, enacted December 17, 2003, as Public Law 108-188, provided financial assistance to the Marshall Islands and Micronesia through 2023. The Compact of Free Association agreement with the Republic of Palau, enshrined in US Public Law 99-658, was followed by a Compact Review Agreement signed between the U.S. and Palau in 2018, extending certain financial provisions through September 30, 2024.

=== 2023 renewal ===
Negotiations to extend the compacts became stalled in December 2020. In February 2022 the Republic of the Marshall Islands' Ambassador to the United States, Gerald Zackios, attributed the impasse to Washington's failure to appoint a negotiator empowered by the president to discuss key issues beyond economic assistance, including remuneration for the legacy of nuclear testing on the islands, the continuing presence of U.S. military bases and the ballistic missile test site at Kwajalein Atoll and climate-change mitigation. Citing "the critical nature of these complex negotiations," U.S. Secretary of State Antony Blinken announced the creation of the position of Special Presidential Envoy for Compact Negotiations on March 22, 2022, President Joe Biden named Ambassador Joseph Yun as the envoy to take over negotiation for amendment and continuation of COFA.

Between March 2022 and October 2023, negotiations led by Ambassador Yun were held with the Compact states, and with the bipartisan support of the US Congress, the framework of the amendments were agreed to, with Yun soon after resigning from his position.

Palau Finance Minister Kaleb Udui Jr. and U.S. Ambassador Yun signed Palau's COFA extension on May 22, 2023, with the island government previously requesting to advance their date more in line with the other two countries. On May 23, 2023, FSM negotiator Leo Falcam, Jr. and a State Department representative signed Micronesia's extension at the U.S. embassy in Pohnpei. Marshall Islands' Minister of Foreign Affairs and Trade Jack Ading, alongside Ambassador Yun, signed the RMI's agreement on October 16, 2023. Total funding for all three agreements is $7.1B paid over 20 years ($889M to Palau; $3.3B to the FSM; $2.3B to the RMI; and $634M for the U.S. Postal Service to offset continuing domestic rate mail service). Approval by each legislature, to include a funding mechanism in Congress, is the final step to bring each agreement into force. On March 8, 2024, the renewed Compacts of Free Association (COFA) were officially signed into law as part of the Consolidated Appropriations Act.

== Potential associated states ==
The former government of the United States unincorporated territory of Guam, led by Governor Eddie Calvo, campaigned for a plebiscite on Guam's future political status, with free association following the model of the Marshall Islands, Micronesia, and Palau as one of the possible options.

In Puerto Rico, the soberanista movement advocates for the territory to be granted a freely associated status. The 2017 status referendum presented "Independence/Free Association" as an option; if the majority of voters had chosen it, a second round of voting would have been held to choose between free association and full independence. In 2022, the U.S. Congress considered a bill entitled the Puerto Rico Status Act, which would have held a federally-sponsored referendum on the territory's status, with a free association status expected as one of the options; while the bill passed in the House, it died in the Senate.

Former U.S. diplomat Richard K. Pruett suggested in 2020 that other possible CFA states could include Kiribati and the Philippines. The number of CFA states so far has been limited, because it is reserved for only the closest allies of the U.S. Although the CFA is very expensive, support for the alliances has been popular in the U.S. and considered mutually beneficial, with the small island nations warning the U.S. of dangers in the Pacific regions, such as global warming and the encroaching influences of foreign powers.

Greenland has also been listed as a potential CFA state, following the 2024 U.S. presidential election. Rasmus Leander Nielsen of the University of Greenland said that Greenlanders have discussed since the 1980s creating a compact of free association with Denmark after independence, and that some have suggested a COFA with the United States instead. Barry Scott Zellen, a scholar of Arctic strategy at the United States Coast Guard Academy, suggested Greenland could become an organized and unincorporated territory of the United States but with a clear pathway to eventual admission as a constituent state "not unlike that which Alaska followed". According to Zellen, "Greenlandic Inuit, who suffer from a long legacy of neglect and whose colonial experience, despite recent gains in autonomy, has not been entirely positive, may indeed stand to benefit in many ways" from this arrangement.

However, the majority of Greenlanders do not want to be part of the United States. In a survey conducted by Verian in Denmark for Berlingske and Sermitsiaq in January 2025, Greenlanders were asked: "Do you want Greenland to leave Denmark and become part of the United States?" The results show that 85% of Greenlanders do not want to leave the Realm and become part of the United States, while 6% want to leave and become part of the U.S., and 9% are undecided.

== U.S. fulfillment of commitments ==
The United States' administration of the former trust territories now covered under the Compacts of Free Association has been subject to ongoing criticism over the past several decades. A 1961 United Nations mission report initially noted deficiencies in "American administration in almost every area: poor transportation, failure to settle war damage claims; failure to adequately compensate for land taken for military purposes; poor living conditions[;] inadequate economic development; inadequate education programs; and almost nonexistent medical care." In 1971, congresswoman Patsy Mink further noted that "[A]fter winning the right to control Micronesia, [the U.S.] proceeded to allow the islands to stagnate and decay through indifference and lack of assistance. . . . [T]he people are still largely impoverished and lacking in all of the basic amenities which we consider essential – adequate education, housing, good health standards, modern sanitation facilities."

After the compacts, criticism was also received by the United States House Foreign Affairs Subcommittee on Asia and the Pacific regarding the unfulfilled commitments of the United States to address the impacts of U.S. nuclear testing in the Marshall Islands, which were included as part of the Pacific Proving Grounds. Speakers noted that while section 177 of the Compact of Free Association recognized the United States' responsibility "to address past, present and future consequences of the nuclear testing claims," less than $4 million was awarded out of a $2.2 billion judgment rendered by a Nuclear Claims Tribunal created under the RMI Compact, and the United States Court of Claims had dismissed two lawsuits to enforce the judgment. With respect to these unaddressed claims, medical practitioners also noted the potential widespread impacts of nuclear testing within the Pacific Proving Grounds, indicated by the prevalence of both radiogenic diseases, as well as heart disease, diabetes, and obesity associated with "[a] forced change in dietary patterns and lifestyle" resulting from U.S. administration after the testing. In 2011, lawmakers further noted that the U.S. Congress had continuously failed to cover the costs of promised medical care and services to displaced compact citizens who migrate to the United States for health care, education, and employment opportunities, particularly since the passage of the Personal Responsibility and Work Opportunity Act.

Questions regarding U.S. responsibility have also been raised regarding the issue of numerous derelict war ships and oil tankers abandoned or destroyed by the U.S. military in atolls and islands throughout the compact area.

== Healthcare issues ==
In 2009, the state of Hawaii, under the administration of Governor Linda Lingle, attempted to restrict health care access for Compact citizens by eliminating all Compact residents of Hawaii from Med-QUEST, the state's comprehensive Medicaid coverage plan. COFA residents were instead subject to Basic Health Hawaii, a limited health care plan under which "transportation services are excluded and patients can receive no more than ten days of medically necessary inpatient hospital care per year, twelve outpatient visits per year, and a maximum of four medication prescriptions per calendar month. . . . BHH covers dialysis treatments as an emergency medical service only, and the approximate ten to twelve prescription medications dialysis patients take per month are not fully covered. BHH . . . caus[es] cancer patients to exhaust their allotted doctors' visits within two to three months".

Noting that such a policy likely constituted unlawful discrimination in violation of the Equal Protection Clause, federal District Court Judge John Michael Seabright issued a preliminary injunction against the implementation of Basic Health Hawaii. In finding a high likelihood of irreparable harm, Judge Seabright took note of the "compelling evidence that BHH's limited coverage ... is causing COFA Residents to forego much needed treatment because they cannot otherwise afford it". Lingle's successor, Governor Neil Abercrombie continued the state's appeal of the injunction to the United States Court of Appeals for the Ninth Circuit, which ruled in favor of the state. When the United States Supreme Court refused to hear the case, the Abercrombie administration removed most COFA residents from Med-QUEST and transferred them onto Affordable Care Act plans. In other states, notably Arkansas, which has a significant population of Marshallese, COFA residents have not been eligible for Medicaid. In 2020, the United States Congress restored Medicaid eligibility for COFA residents with the Consolidated Appropriations Act.

In 2024, access to COFA members to many federal programs was restored, such as Supplemental Nutrition Assistance Program, Temporary Assistance for Needy Families, and Supplemental Security Income after it had been dropped in the 1990s after a welfare reform bill. Medicaid had already been restored in 2020.

== See also ==
- Associated state
- Proposed United States acquisition of Greenland
- Protectorate
- Sovereigntism (Puerto Rico)
- Territories of the United States
