= Marshallese passport =

Passport issued to citizens of the Marshall Islands

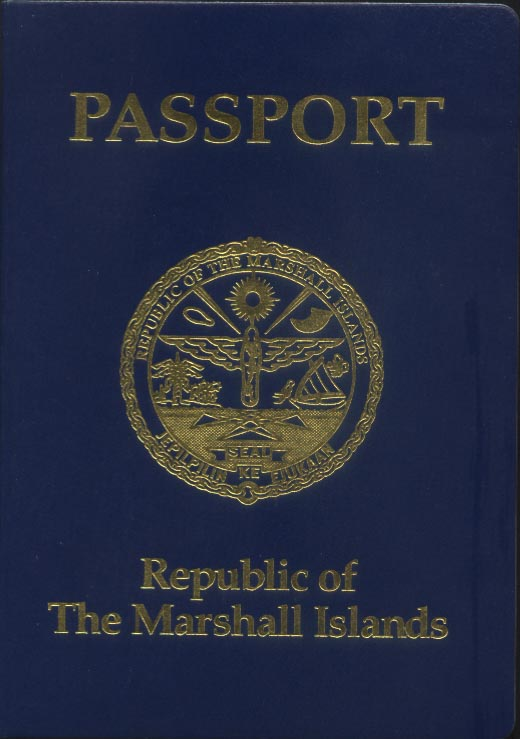
- The front cover of a contemporary Marshallese passport.
- Type: Passport
- Issued by: Marshall Islands
- Purpose: Identification
- Eligibility: Marshallese citizenship

The Marshallese passport is an international travel document that is issued to Marshallese citizens.

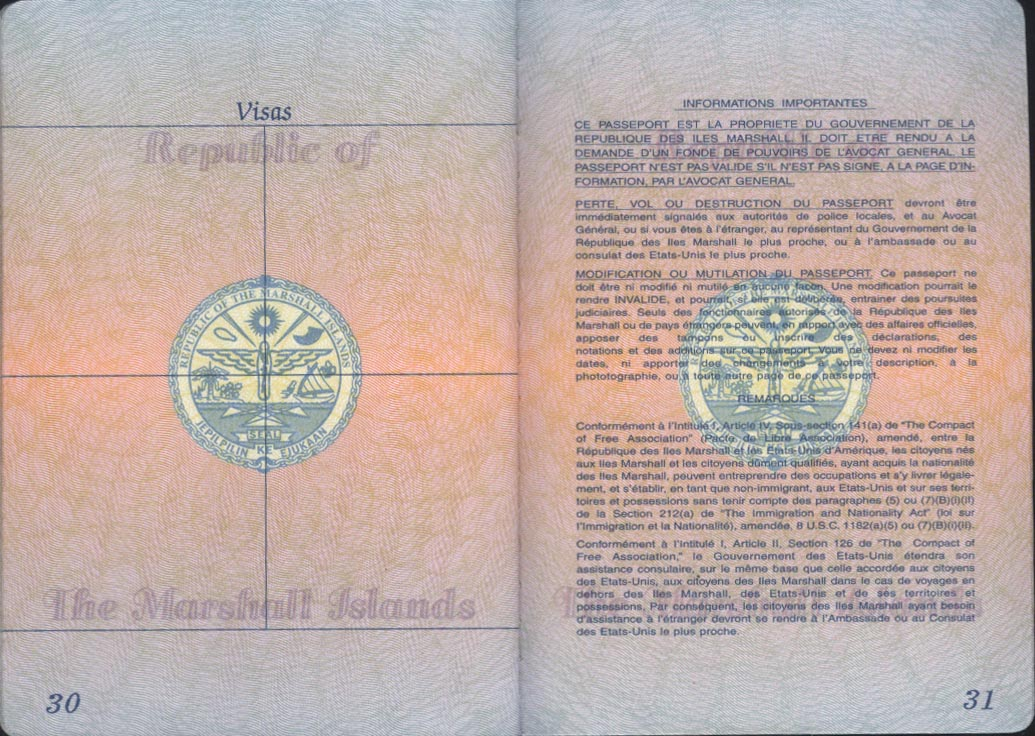
Visa page and Information page of a Marshallese passport.

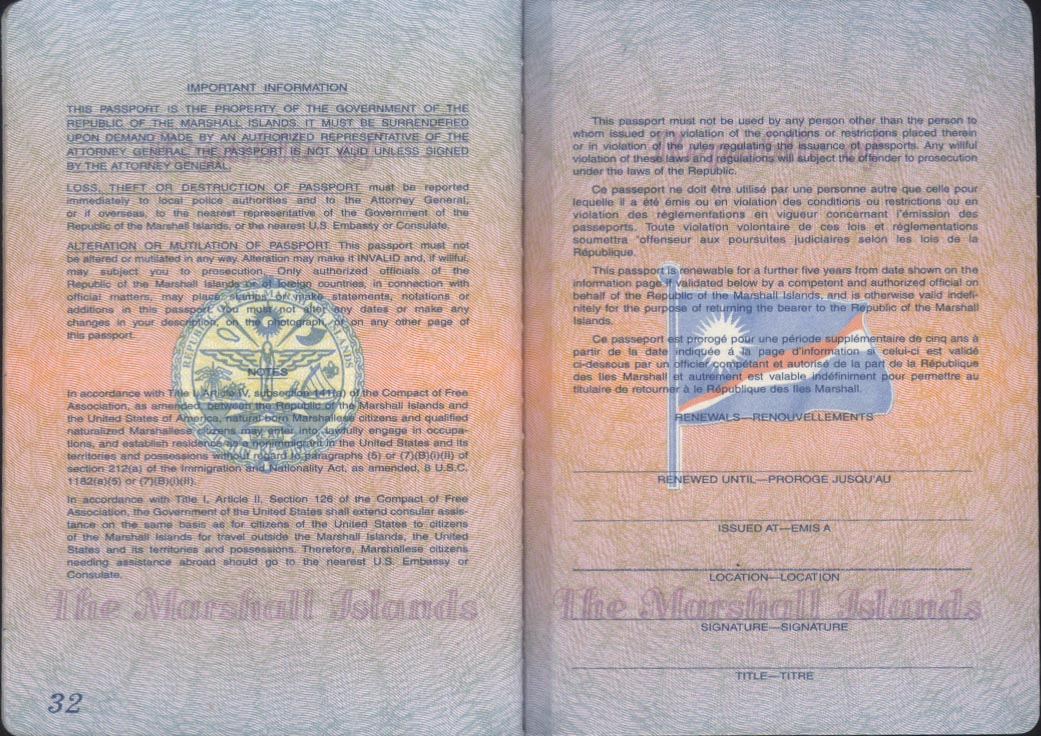
Information page of a Marshallese passport.

== Physical appearance ==
- The Marshall Islands passport includes the following data:
- Photo of passport holder
- Code of issuing state (MHL)
- Passport number
- Name of the holder
- Name of the issuing state (Republic of the Marshall Islands)
- Date of birth of the passport holder
- Sex
- Place of Birth
- Date of issue
- Date of expiry
- Issuing authority

== Visa requirements ==
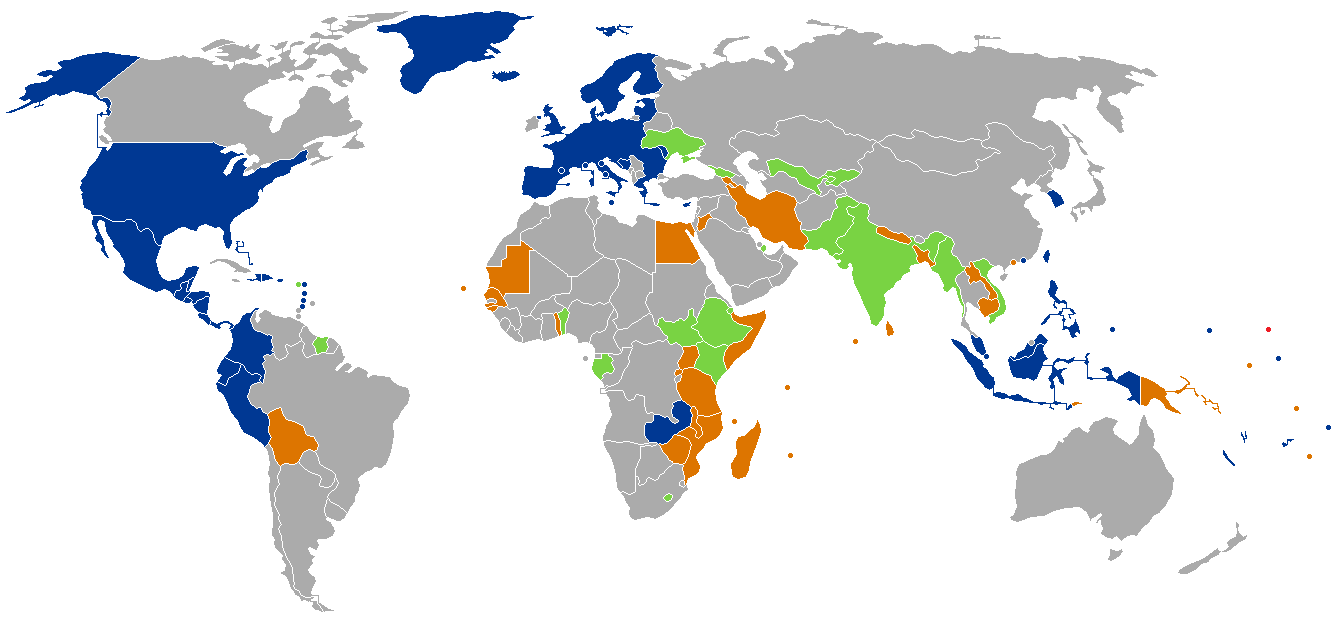
Visa requirements for Marshall Islands citizens Marshall Islands Visa-free Visa on arrival eVisa

As of March 2023, Marshallese citizens had visa-free or visa on arrival access to 123 countries and territories, ranking the Marshallese passport 87th in terms of travel freedom (tied with the Colombian, Macedonian and Tuvaluan) according to the Henley visa restrictions index.

Marshall Islands signed a mutual visa waiver agreement with Schengen Area countries on 28 June 2016.

== See also ==
- Visa requirements for Marshallese citizens
