= Visa requirements for Colombian citizens =

Administrative entry restrictions

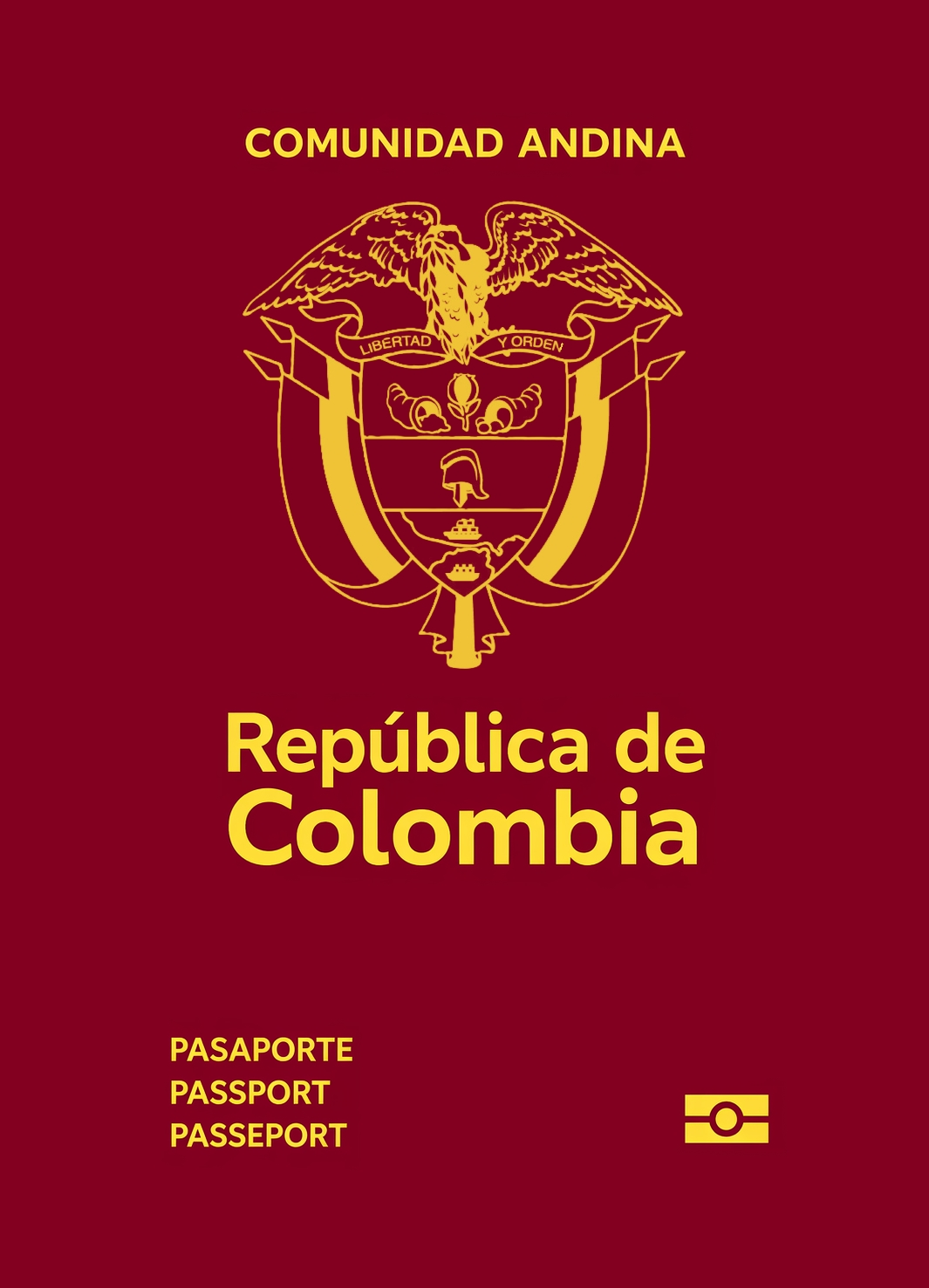
A Colombian passport

Visa requirements for Colombian citizens are administrative entry restrictions by the authorities of other states placed on citizens of Colombia.

As of 2026, Colombian citizens had visa-free or visa on arrival access to 130 countries and territories, ranking the Colombian passport 34th in the world according to the Henley Passport Index.

Citizens of Colombia do not need a passport when travelling to Argentina, Bolivia, Brazil, Chile, Ecuador, Paraguay, Peru, and Uruguay. For these countries, they may use just their national identification cards.

== Visa requirements map ==
Visa requirements for Colombian citizens holding ordinary passports.

Colombia Freedom of movement / ID card valid Visa not required Visa on arrival eVisa Visa available both on arrival or online Visa required

== Visa requirements ==
Visa requirements for holders of ordinary passports travelling for tourism purposes:

Colombia is an associated member of Mercosur. As such, its citizens enjoy unlimited access to any of the full members (Argentina, Brazil, Paraguay and Uruguay) and other associated members (Bolivia, Ecuador and Peru) with the right to residence and work, with no requirement other than nationality. Citizens of these eight countries (including Colombia) may apply for the grant of "temporary residence" for up to two years in another country of the bloc. Then, they may apply for "permanent residence" just before the term of their "temporary residence" expires.

The case of Chile, however, is different. Colombian citizens can enter Chile with just the ID card, but they need to hold a visa prior to travel if they want to reside and work in Chile.

| Country | Visa requirement | Allowed stay | Notes (excluding departure fees) |
|---|---|---|---|
| Afghanistan | eVisa | 30 days | e-Visa : Visitors must arrive at Kabul International (KBL). |
| Albania | Visa not required | 90 days | |
| Algeria | Visa required | | Visitors on tours organized to some southern regions by an approved travel agency may obtain a visa on arrival for up to 30 days. |
| Andorra | Visa not required | 90 days | |
| Angola | eVisa | | |
| Antigua and Barbuda | Visa not required | 90 days | |
| Argentina | Freedom of Movement | 90 days | Entry is allowed with a valid Colombian identity card.; Colombians can live and work legally in Argentina under the Mercosur (and Associated Members) immigration agreement with no requirement other than being a citizen at birth or a naturalized citizen for over 5 years, and passing a background check. |
| Armenia | eVisa | 120 days | May apply for a visa on arrival only if holding a valid visa or valid permanent resident permit (resident card) issued by Australia, Belarus, Canada, Gulf Cooperation Council countries, Japan, New Zealand, Russia, Singapore, South Korea, European Union / Schengen Area member states, United Kingdom or United States |
| Australia | Visa required | | May apply online (Online Visitor e600 visa). |
| Austria | Visa not required | 90 days | 90 days within any 180 day period in the Schengen Area. |
| Azerbaijan | eVisa | 30 days | Visa on Arrival for holders of a valid GCC state residence permit |
| Bahamas | Visa not required | 3 months | |
| Bahrain | eVisa / Visa on arrival | 14 days | |
| Bangladesh | Visa on arrival | 30 days | Only Available if traveling from a country where there is no Bangladeshi Embassy / High Commission / Consulate. |
| Barbados | Visa not required | 90 days | |
| Belarus | Visa not required / eVisa | 90 days / 30 days | |
| Belgium | Visa not required | 90 days | 90 days within any 180 day period in the Schengen Area. |
| Belize | Visa not required | 90 days | |
| Benin | eVisa | 30 days | Must have an international vaccination certificate.; Three types of electronic visa are offered: the e-Visa valid for 30 days for a single entry (50 EUR), the e-Visa valid for 30 days for several (multiple) entries (75 EUR), and the e-Visa valid for 90 days to make several (multiple) entries (100 EUR). |
| Bhutan | eVisa | 90 days | Visa fee is 40 USD per person and visa application may be processed within 5 business days with duration of stay of 90 days.; The Sustainable Development Fee (SDF) of 200 USD per person, per night for almost all visitors to Bhutan. Additionally, if payment is made in US dollars from September 1, 2023 to August 31, 2027, the SDF is 100 USD. |
| Bolivia | Freedom of Movement | 90 days | |
| Bosnia and Herzegovina | Visa not required | 90 days | |
| Botswana | eVisa | 3 months | |
| Brazil | Freedom of Movement | 90 days | Entry is allowed with a valid Colombian identity card.; Colombians can live and work legally in Brazil under the Mercosur (and Associated Members) immigration agreement with no requirement other than being a citizen at birth or a naturalized citizen for over 5 years, and passing a background check. |
| Brunei | Visa required | | |
| Bulgaria | Visa not required | 90 days | 90 days within any 180 day period in the Schengen Area. |
| Burkina Faso | eVisa | | |
| Burundi | Online Visa / Visa on arrival | 1 month | |
| Cambodia | eVisa / Visa on arrival | 30 days | |
| Cameroon | eVisa | | |
| Canada | Visa required | | Visa not required if holding a Green Card from the U.S. |
| Cape Verde | Visa required | | |
| Central African Republic | Visa required | | |
| Chad | eVisa | | |
| Chile | Visa not required | 90 days | Entry is allowed with a valid Colombian identity card, although Colombians need to hold a visa prior to travel if they want to reside and work in Chile. |
| China | Visa required | | 24-hour visa-free transit is available at most international airports for travellers in transit to a third country or region (including Hong Kong, Macau, and Taiwan) within 24 hours, if they do not leave the airport.; Travellers who need to leave the airport may obtain a temporary entry permit from immigration.; 5-day Visa on Arrival (port visa) for Shenzhen if arriving at designated ports of entry from Hong Kong by land or sea, for stays within Shenzhen.; 3-day Visa on Arrival (port visa) if arriving in Zhuhai or Xiamen at designated ports of entry, for stays within the respective city.; 15-day visa-free entry for cruise ship passengers in tour groups, if arriving at any cruise port along China's coastline, including but not limited to Tianjin; Dalian; Shanghai; Lianyungang; Wenzhou; Zhoushan; Xiamen; Qingdao; Guangzhou; Shenzhen; Beihai; Haikou; Sanya. May further travel inland to all regions of coastal provinces (and equivalents) and Beijing.; May apply for a port visa on arrival if travelling for an urgent, qualified reason. Prior clearance for port visa is highly recommended or may be denied boarding by airlines. |
| Comoros | Visa on arrival | 45 days | |
| Republic of the Congo | Visa required | | |
| Democratic Republic of the Congo | eVisa | 7 days | |
| Costa Rica | Visa required | | No visa required if holding a Multiple Entry Visa for the United States, Canada.; May transit without visa if transit is through San José Airport and for no longer than 12 hours. |
| Côte d'Ivoire | eVisa | 3 months | e-Visa holders must arrive via Port Bouet Airport. |
| Croatia | Visa not required | 90 days | 90 days within any 180 day period in the Schengen Area. |
| Cuba | eVisa | 90 days | |
| Cyprus | Visa not required | 90 days | 90 days within any 180 day period. |
| Czech Republic | Visa not required | 90 days | 90 days within any 180 day period in the Schengen Area. |
| Denmark | Visa not required | 90 days | 90 days within any 180 day period in the Schengen Area. |
| Djibouti | eVisa | 90 days | |
| Dominica | Visa not required | 21 days | |
| Dominican Republic | Visa not required | 30 days | Extendable up to 120 days. |
| Ecuador | Freedom of Movement | 90 days | Entry is allowed with a valid Colombian identity card.; Colombians can live and work legally in Ecuador under the Mercosur (and Associated Members) immigration agreement with no requirement other than being a citizen at birth or a naturalized citizen for over 5 years, and passing a background check. |
| Egypt | eVisa / Visa on arrival | 30 days | Visa on arrival costs 30 USD for Single entry visa (Tourism). |
| El Salvador | Visa not required | 3 months | |
| Equatorial Guinea | eVisa | | |
| Eritrea | Visa required | | |
| Estonia | Visa not required | 90 days | 90 days within any 180 day period in the Schengen Area. |
| Eswatini | Visa required | | |
| Ethiopia | eVisa | 90 days | Visa on arrival is obtainable only at Addis Ababa Bole International Airport.; e-Visa holders must arrive via Addis Ababa Bole International Airport.; e-Visa is available for 30 or 90 days. |
| Fiji | Visa not required | 4 months | |
| Finland | Visa not required | 90 days | 90 days within any 180 day period in the Schengen Area. |
| France | Visa not required | 90 days | 90 days within any 180 day period in the Schengen Area. |
| Gabon | eVisa | 90 days | e-Visa holders must arrive via Libreville International Airport. |
| Gambia | Visa required | | An entry clearance must be obtained from the Gambian Immigration prior to travel. |
| Georgia | Visa not required | 1 year | |
| Germany | Visa not required | 90 days | 90 days within any 180 day period in the Schengen Area. |
| Ghana | Visa required | | |
| Greece | Visa not required | 90 days | 90 days within any 180 day period in the Schengen Area. |
| Grenada | Visa required | | |
| Guatemala | Visa not required | 90 days | |
| Guinea | eVisa | 90 days | |
| Guinea-Bissau | Visa on arrival | 90 days | |
| Guyana | Visa not required | 90 days | |
| Haiti | Visa required | | No visa required if holding a United States Visa. |
| Honduras | Visa not required | 3 months | |
| Hungary | Visa not required | 90 days | 90 days within any 180 day period in the Schengen Area. |
| Iceland | Visa not required | 90 days | 90 days within any 180 day period in the Schengen Area. |
| India | eVisa | 30 days | e-Visa holders must arrive via 32 designated airports (Note: Ahmedabad; Amritsar; Bagdogra; Bengaluru; Bhubaneswar; Chandigarh; Chennai; Coimbatore; Delhi; Gaya; Goa-Dabolim; Goa-Manohar; Guwahati; Hyderabad; Indore; Jaipur; Kannur; Kochi; Kolkata; Kozhikode; Lucknow; Madurai; Mangaluru; Mumbai; Nagpur; Port Blair; Pune; Surat; Thiruvananthapuram; Tiruchirappalli; Varanasi; Visakhapatnam) or 5 designated seaports. (Note: Chennai; Cochin; Mormugao (Goa); Mumbai; Mangalore); An Indian e-Tourist Visa may only be obtained twice within 1 calendar year.; Foreigners of Pakistani origin or who hold a Pakistani Passport are not eligible for an e-Visa. Foreigners who are not Pakistani nationals, but whose parents or grandparents (either paternal or maternal) were born in, or were permanent residents in Pakistan, are also not eligible for an e-Visa. |
| Indonesia | Visa not required / e-VOA | 30 days | |
| Iran | Visa required | | Passengers can obtain an e-visa before departure. A printed confirmation is required. Applications with status waiting for verification are not accepted. A hard copy of the grant notice must be presented at the visa-on-arrival counter. |
| Iraq | eVisa | 30 days | |
| Ireland | Visa required | | Visa exemption for holders of a valid short-stay visa issued by the United Kingdom, provided they have first entered the United Kingdom, travel directly to Ireland, and have been granted a stay of 180 days in the United Kingdom; permitted stay is up to 90 days or until the end of the United Kingdom stay, whichever is shorter. |
| Israel | Electronic Travel Authorization | 90 days | |
| Italy | Visa not required | 90 days | 90 days within any 180 day period in the Schengen Area. |
| Jamaica | Visa not required | 30 days | |
| Japan | Visa required | | Visa requirement effective on 1 February 2004.; Holders of a residence permit in Australia, Brazil, Cambodia, Canada, India, Saudi Arabia, Singapore, South Africa, Taiwan, United Arab Emirates, United Kingdom, United States. can apply for a single entry e-visa individually. The duration of stay for these jurisdictions is up to 90 days (unless otherwise noted). e-Visa holder must arrive in Japan by air. |
| Jordan | eVisa / Visa on arrival | | Visa can be obtained upon arrival, it will cost a total of 40 JOD, obtainable at most international ports of entry and land border crossings. (except King Hussein/Allenby Bridge) |
| Kazakhstan | Visa not required | 30 days | |
| Kenya | Electronic Travel Authorisation | 90 days | Applications can be submitted up to 90 days prior to travel and must be submitted at least 3 days in advance.; eTA fee is 32.50 USD.; Proof of reservation at the hotel where visitors plan to stay is required (if staying with friends, an invitation letter is also acceptable).; Yellow fever vaccination certificate is required if coming from endemic countries. |
| Kiribati | Visa not required | 90 days | 90 days within any 12-month period. |
| North Korea | Visa required | | |
| South Korea | Electronic Travel Authorization | 90 days | The validity period of a K-ETA is 3 years from the date of approval. |
| Kuwait | Visa required | | e-Visa available via official portal. A printed confirmation is required and can be verified using the Kuwait Visa app. |
| Kyrgyzstan | eVisa | 30 days | e-Visa holders must arrive via Manas International Airport or Osh Airport or through land crossings with China (at Irkeshtam and Torugart), Kazakhstan (at Ak-jol, Ak-Tilek, Chaldybar, Chon-Kapka), Tajikistan (at Bor-Dobo, Kulundu, Kyzyl-Bel) and Uzbekistan (at Dostuk). |
| Laos | eVisa / Visa on arrival | 30 days | 18 (Note: Savannakhet Airport; Lanetoui - Mengkang (China); Meuangmom - Wan Pong (Myanmar); Banvang - Ban Khok Phai (Thailand); Namngeun - Huay Kon (Thailand); Paksan - Bueng Kan (Thailand); Paktaphan - Pak Saeng (Thailand); Pangmon - Ban Huak (Thailand); Phoudou (Thailand); Dak ta ock - Nam Giang (Vietnam); La Lai (Vietnam); Namkan (Vietnam); Namphao - Cau Treo (Vietnam); Namsoy - Na Meo (Vietnam); Naphao - Cha Lo (Vietnam); Pahang - Long Sap (Vietnam); Panghok - Tây Trang (Vietnam); Phoukeua - Bo Y (Vietnam)) of the 33 border crossings are only open to regular visa holders.; e-Visa may be used to enter Laos through the Luang Prabang, Pakse and Vientiane international airports, 3 Thai-Lao Friendship Bridges (Note: Vientiane (Friendship Bridge 1); Savannakhet (Friendship Bridge 2); Bokeo (Friendship Bridge 4)), in Boten (road and railroad), and in Vientiane (at Khamsavath railway station).; Visa on arrival is available at the Luang Prabang, Pakse and Vientiane international airports, 4 Thai-Lao Friendship Bridges (Note: Vientiane (Friendship Bridge 1); Savannakhet (Friendship Bridge 2); Khammouane (Friendship Bridge 3); Bokeo (Friendship Bridge 4)) and 7 border crossings. (Note: Nongnokkheane - Trapeang Kriel (Cambodia); Boten - Bo han (China); Golden Triangle/Samliemkham (Thailand); Khamsavath railway station (Thailand); Namheuang - Ban Na Kraseng (Thailand); Vang tao - Chongmek (Thailand); Dansavan - Lao Bảo (Vietnam)) |
| Latvia | Visa not required | 90 days | 90 days within any 180 day period in the Schengen Area. |
| Lebanon | Visa required | | |
| Lesotho | Visa required | | |
| Liberia | e-VOA | 3 months | |
| Libya | eVisa | | |
| Liechtenstein | Visa not required | 90 days | 90 days within any 180 day period in the Schengen Area. |
| Lithuania | Visa not required | 90 days | 90 days within any 180 day period in the Schengen Area. |
| Luxembourg | Visa not required | 90 days | 90 days within any 180 day period in the Schengen Area. |
| Madagascar | eVisa / Visa on arrival | 90 days | For stays of 61 to 90 days, the visa fee is 59 USD. |
| Malawi | eVisa | 30 days | |
| Malaysia | eVisa | 14 days | Extension not allowed. |
| Maldives | Free visa on arrival | 30 days | |
| Mali | Visa required | | |
| Malta | Visa not required | 90 days | 90 days within any 180 day period in the Schengen Area. |
| Marshall Islands | Visa on arrival | 90 days | |
| Mauritania | eVisa | 30 days | Available at Nouakchott–Oumtounsy International Airport. |
| Mauritius | Visa on arrival | 60 days | |
| Mexico | Visa not required | 180 days | |
| Micronesia | Visa not required | 30 days | |
| Moldova | Visa not required | 90 days | 90 days within any 180 day period. |
| Monaco | Visa not required | 90 days | |
| Mongolia | Visa not required | 90 days | |
| Montenegro | Visa not required | 90 days | |
| Morocco | Visa not required | 90 days | |
| Mozambique | eVisa / Visa on arrival | 30 days | |
| Myanmar | eVisa | 28 days | e-Visa holders must arrive via Yangon, Nay Pyi Taw or Mandalay airports or via land border crossings with Thailand — Tachileik, Myawaddy and Kawthaung or India — Rih Khaw Dar and Tamu.; e-Visa is available for tourism only. |
| Namibia | eVisa | 3 months | |
| Nauru | Visa required | | |
| Nepal | Online Visa / Visa on arrival | 90 days | |
| Netherlands | Visa not required | 90 days | 90 days within any 180 day period in the Schengen Area. |
| New Zealand | Visa required | | May transit without visa if transit is through Auckland Airport and for no longer than 24 hours, subject to meeting character requirements and obtaining an Electronic Travel Authority prior to departure.; Holders of an Australian Permanent Resident Visa or Resident Return Visa may be granted a New Zealand Resident Visa on arrival permitting indefinite stay (pursuant to the Trans-Tasman Travel Arrangement), subject to meeting character requirements and obtaining an Electronic Travel Authority prior to departure. |
| Nicaragua | Visa required | | Visa exemption for nationals born in the Raizal territories of the Archipelago of San Andrés, Providencia and Santa Catalina, for stays of up to 90 days.; Visa exemption for passengers whose place of birth is listed as El Salvador. |
| Niger | Visa required | | |
| Nigeria | eVisa | 30 days | |
| North Macedonia | Visa not required | 90 days | |
| Norway | Visa not required | 90 days | 90 days within any 180 day period in the Schengen Area. |
| Oman | Visa not required / eVisa | 14 days / 30 days | |
| Pakistan | eVisa | 3 months | |
| Palau | Free visa on arrival | 30 days | |
| Panama | Visa not required | 90 days | |
| Papua New Guinea | eVisa | 60 days | Visitors may apply for a visa online under the "Tourist - Own Itinerary" category. |
| Paraguay | Freedom of Movement | 90 days | Entry is allowed with a valid Colombian identity card.; Colombians can live and work legally in Paraguay under the Mercosur (and Associated Members) immigration agreement with no requirement other than being a citizen at birth or a naturalized citizen for over 5 years, and passing a background check. |
| Peru | Freedom of Movement | 183 days | Entry is allowed with a valid Colombian identity card.; Colombians can live and work legally in Peru under the Mercosur (and Associated Members) immigration agreement with no requirement other than being a citizen at birth or a naturalized citizen for over 5 years, and passing a background check. |
| Philippines | Visa not required | 30 days | |
| Poland | Visa not required | 90 days | 90 days within any 180 day period in the Schengen Area. |
| Portugal | Visa not required | 90 days | 90 days within any 180 day period in the Schengen Area. |
| Qatar | Visa not required | 30 days | |
| Romania | Visa not required | 90 days | 90 days within any 180 day period in the Schengen Area. |
| Russia | Visa not required | 90 days | 90 days within any 180 day period. |
| Rwanda | eVisa / Visa on arrival | 30 days | |
| Saint Kitts and Nevis | Electronic Travel Authorisation | 3 months | |
| Saint Lucia | Visa required | | |
| Saint Vincent and the Grenadines | Visa not required | 3 months | |
| Samoa | Entry permit on arrival | 90 days | |
| San Marino | Visa not required | 90 days | |
| São Tomé and Príncipe | eVisa | | |
| Saudi Arabia | Visa required | | Visa on arrival available for holders of a valid visa issued by the United States, the United Kingdom, or a Schengen Member State, for stays of up to 90 days within a 12-month period, provided the visa has been used at least once and bears an entry stamp of the issuing country. |
| Senegal | Visa required | | |
| Serbia | Visa not required | 30 days | 30 days within any 1-year period. |
| Seychelles | Electronic Border System | 3 months | Application can be submitted up to 30 days before travel.; Visitors must upload a reservation confirmation(s) for each visitor's location of stay in Seychelles.; Yellow fever vaccination certificate is required if coming from endemic countries.; Payment of the fee (EUR 10) by credit or debit card.; Valid for one journey only and it expires once exit the country. |
| Sierra Leone | eVisa | 3 months | |
| Singapore | Visa not required | 30 days | Arrival Card is required. |
| Slovakia | Visa not required | 90 days | 90 days within any 180 day period in the Schengen Area. |
| Slovenia | Visa not required | 90 days | 90 days within any 180 day period in the Schengen Area. |
| Solomon Islands | Visa required | | |
| Somalia | eVisa | 30 days | |
| South Africa | Visa required | | |
| South Sudan | eVisa | | Obtainable online.; Printed visa authorization must be presented at the time of travel. |
| Spain | Visa not required | 90 days | 90 days within any 180 day period in the Schengen Area. |
| Sri Lanka | ETA / Visa on arrival | 30 days | |
| Sudan | Visa required | | |
| Suriname | Visa not required | 90 days | An entrance fee of USD 50 or EUR 50 must be paid online prior to arrival.; Multiple entry e-Visa is also available. |
| Sweden | Visa not required | 90 days | 90 days within any 180 day period in the Schengen Area. |
| Switzerland | Visa not required | 90 days | 90 days within any 180 day period in the Schengen Area. |
| Syria | eVisa | | |
| Tajikistan | eVisa | 60 days | |
| Tanzania | eVisa / Visa on arrival | 90 days | |
| Thailand | Visa not required | 60 days | |
| Timor-Leste | Visa on arrival | 30 days | |
| Togo | eVisa | 15 days | |
| Tonga | Visa required | | |
| Trinidad and Tobago | Visa not required | 90 days | |
| Tunisia | Visa required | | |
| Turkey | Visa not required | 90 days | |
| Turkmenistan | Visa required | | When transiting between two non-bordering countries, visitors can obtain a Turkmenistan transit visa for a five-day stay. This must be applied for in advance at the Turkmenistan Embassy. Visitors must also submit copies of the visas for the country of entry into Turkmenistan and the country of departure from Turkmenistan. Visa fee is 20 USD. |
| Tuvalu | Visa on arrival | 1 month | |
| Uganda | eVisa | 3 months | Determined at the port of entry. |
| Ukraine | Visa not required | 90 days | |
| United Arab Emirates | Visa not required | 90 days | |
| United Kingdom | Visa required | | |
| United States | Visa required | | Certain Colombian Government officials may be denied entry. Colombian citizens with valid U.S. visas may enter the United States with enhanced scrutiny. |
| Uruguay | Freedom of Movement | 90 days | Entry is allowed with a valid Colombian identity card.; Colombians can live and work legally in Uruguay under the Mercosur (and Associated Members) immigration agreement with no requirement other than being a citizen at birth or a naturalized citizen for over 5 years, and passing a background check. |
| Uzbekistan | eVisa | 30 days | |
| Vanuatu | eVisa | 120 days | |
| Vatican City | Visa not required | 90 days | |
| Venezuela | Visa not required | 90 days | |
| Vietnam | eVisa | | e-Visa is valid for 90 days and multiple entry. |
| Yemen | Visa required | | Yemen introduced an e-Visa system for visitors who meet certain eligibility requirements (group travel of 10 or more people, business trips, and transit etc.). |
| Zambia | eVisa / Visa on arrival | 90 days | |
| Zimbabwe | eVisa | 1 month | |

== Unrecognized or partially recognized countries ==
| Countries | Conditions of access | Notes |
|---|---|---|
| Abkhazia | Visa required | Tourists from all countries (except Georgia) can visit Abkhazia for a period not exceeding 24 hours as part of an organized tourist group. |
| Kosovo | Visa not required | |
| Northern Cyprus | Visa not required | |
| Palestine | Visa not required | |
| Somaliland | Visa required | |
| South Ossetia | Visa required | To enter South Ossetia, visitors must have a multiple-entry visa for Russia and register their stay with the Migration Service of the Ministry of Internal Affairs within 3 days. |
| Taiwan | Visa required | May apply for an e-Visa only if holding a valid visa or resident certificate issued by a Schengen country, or a valid resident certificate or visa valid for more than 180 days issued by the United States. |
| Transnistria | Visa not required | |

== Dependent and autonomous territories ==
| Countries | Conditions of access | Notes |
China
| Hong Kong | Visa not required | 90 days |
| Macau | Visa on arrival | 30 days |
Denmark
| Faroe Islands | Visa not required | |
| Greenland | Visa not required | |
France
| French Guiana | Visa not required | 90 days |
| French Polynesia | Visa not required | 90 days |
| (France) French West Indies | Visa not required | 90 days includes overseas departments of Guadeloupe and Martinique. |
| (France) Saint Martin and Saint Barthélemy | Visa not required | 90 days |
| Mayotte | Visa not required | 90 days |
| New Caledonia | Visa not required | 90 days |
| Réunion | Visa not required | 90 days |
| Saint Pierre and Miquelon | Visa not required | 90 days |
| Wallis and Futuna | Visa not required | 90 days |
Netherlands
| Aruba | Visa not required | 90 days |
| Caribbean Netherlands | Visa not required | 90 days (includes Bonaire, Sint Eustatius and Saba) |
| Curaçao | Visa not required | 90 days |
| Sint Maarten | Visa not required | 90 days |
New Zealand
| Cook Islands | Visa not required | 31 days |
| Niue | Visa not required | 30 days |
| Tokelau | Visa required | |
United Kingdom
| Akrotiri and Dhekelia | Visa not required | Part of the Schengen area. |
| Anguilla | Visa not required | |
| Ascension Island | eVisa | Valid for 3 months within 1 year. |
| Bermuda | Visa required | |
| British Virgin Islands | Visa required | No visa required if holding a United Kingdom, United States or Canadian multiple entry visa |
| Cayman Islands | Visa required | Visa not required if holding a Green Card from the U.S. Or a Permanent resident Card from Canada and you arrive directly from that country; and you produce on arrival a return or round trip ticket to the United States or Canada. |
| Falkland Islands | Visa required | |
| Gibraltar | Visa not required | De facto part of the Schengen area. |
| Guernsey | Visa required | |
| Isle of Man | Visa required | |
| Jersey | Visa required | |
| Montserrat | eVisa | |
| Saint Helena | eVisa | |
| Turks and Caicos | Visa not required | |
United States
| American Samoa | Visa required | |
| Guam | Visa required | |
| Northern Mariana Islands | Visa required | |
| U.S. Virgin Islands | Visa required | |
| Puerto Rico | Visa required | |

== Non-visa restrictions ==
=== Blank passport pages ===
Many countries require a minimum number of blank pages to be available in the passport being presented, typically one or two pages. Endorsement pages, which often appear after the visa pages, are not counted as being valid or available.

=== Vaccination ===
Cover of the new International Certificate of Vaccination issued by the Bureau of Quarantine in the Philippines since 2021

The African countries of Angola, Benin, Burkina Faso, Burundi, Cameroon, Central African Republic, Democratic Republic of the Congo, Republic of the Congo, Côte d'Ivoire, Gabon, Ghana, Guinea-Bissau, Mali, Niger, Sierra Leone and Togo, South Sudan and Uganda, along with French Guiana in South America, require all incoming passengers older than nine months to one year, to have a current International Certificate of Vaccination or Prophylaxis.

Some other countries require vaccination only if the passenger is coming from an infected area or has visited one recently or has transited for 12 hours in those countries: Algeria, Botswana, Cabo Verde, Chad, Djibouti, Egypt, Eswatini, Ethiopia, Gambia, Ghana, Guinea, Lesotho, Libya, Equatorial Guinea, Eritrea, Madagascar, Malawi, Mauritania, Mauritius, Mozambique, Namibia, Nigeria, Papua New Guinea, Seychelles, Somalia, South Africa, Sudan, Tunisia, Uganda, Tanzania, Zambia and Zimbabwe.

=== Passport validity length ===
Very few countries, such as Paraguay, just require a valid passport on arrival.

However many countries and groupings now require only an identity card – especially from their neighbours. Other countries may have special bilateral arrangements that depart from the generality of their passport validity length policies to shorten the period of passport validity required for each other's citizens or even accept passports that have already expired (but not been cancelled).

Some countries, such as Japan, Ireland and the United Kingdom, require a passport valid throughout the period of the intended stay.

In the absence of specific bilateral agreements, countries requiring passports to be valid for at least 6 more months on arrival include Afghanistan, Algeria, Anguilla, Bahrain, Bhutan, Botswana, British Virgin Islands, Brunei, Cambodia, Cameroon, Cape Verde, Cayman Islands, Central African Republic, Chad, Comoros, Costa Rica, Côte d'Ivoire, Curaçao, Ecuador, Egypt, El Salvador, Equatorial Guinea, Fiji, Gabon, Guinea Bissau, Guyana, Haiti, India, Indonesia, Iran, Iraq, Israel, Jordan, Kenya, Kiribati, Kuwait, Laos, Madagascar, Malaysia, Marshall Islands, Mongolia, Myanmar, Namibia, Nepal, Nicaragua, Nigeria, Oman, Palau, Papua New Guinea, Peru, Philippines, Qatar, Rwanda, Samoa, Saudi Arabia, Singapore, Solomon Islands, Somalia, Sri Lanka, Sudan, Suriname, Tanzania, Thailand, Timor-Leste, Tokelau, Tonga, Turkey, Tuvalu, Uganda, United Arab Emirates, Vanuatu, Venezuela, and Vietnam.

Countries requiring passports valid for at least 4 months on arrival include Micronesia and Zambia.

Countries requiring passports with a validity of at least 3 months beyond the date of intended departure include Azerbaijan, Bosnia and Herzegovina, Honduras, Montenegro, Nauru, Moldova and New Zealand. Similarly, the EEA countries of Iceland, Liechtenstein, Norway, all European Union countries (except Ireland) together with Switzerland also require 3 months validity beyond the date of the bearer's intended departure unless the bearer is an EEA or Swiss national.

Countries requiring passports valid for at least 3 months on arrival include Albania, North Macedonia, Panama, and Senegal.

Bermuda requires passports to be valid for at least 45 days upon entry.

Countries that require a passport validity of at least one month beyond the date of intended departure include Eritrea, Hong Kong, Lebanon, Macau, the Maldives and South Africa.

==== Maximum passport age ====
Countries of the Schengen area require non-EU passports to be less than 10 years old upon entry.

=== Criminal record ===
Some countries, including Australia, Canada, Fiji, New Zealand and the United States, routinely deny entry to non-citizens who have a criminal record, while others impose restrictions depending on the type of conviction and the length of the sentence.

=== Persona non grata ===
The government of a country can declare a diplomat persona non grata, banning them from entering the country or expelling them if they have already entered. In non-diplomatic use, the authorities of a country may also declare a foreigner persona non grata permanently or temporarily, usually because of unlawful activity.

=== Israeli stamps ===
Kuwait, Lebanon, Libya, and Yemen do not allow entry to people with passport stamps from Israel or whose passports have either a used or an unused Israeli visa, or where there is evidence of previous travel to Israel such as entry or exit stamps from neighbouring border posts in transit countries such as Jordan and Egypt.

To circumvent this Arab League boycott of Israel, the Israeli immigration services have now mostly ceased to stamp foreign nationals' passports on either entry to or exit from Israel (unless the entry is for some work-related purposes). Since 15 January 2013, Israel no longer stamps foreign passports at Ben Gurion Airport. Passports are still (as of 22 June 2017) stamped at Erez when passing into and out of Gaza.

Iran refuses admission to holders of passports containing an Israeli visa or stamp that is less than 12 months old.

=== Biometrics ===
Several countries mandate that all travellers, or all foreign travellers, be fingerprinted on arrival and will refuse admission to or even arrest travellers who refuse to comply. In some countries, such as the United States, this may apply even to transit passengers who merely wish to change planes rather than go landside.

Fingerprinting countries/regions include Afghanistan, Argentina, Brunei, Cambodia, China, Ethiopia, Ghana, Guinea, India, Japan, Kenya (both fingerprints and a photo are taken), Malaysia upon entry and departure, Mongolia, Saudi Arabia, the Schengen Area, Singapore, South Korea, Taiwan, Thailand, Uganda, the United Arab Emirates and the United States.

Many countries also require a photo be taken of people entering the country. The United States, which does not fully implement exit control formalities at its land frontiers (although long mandated by its own legislation), intends to implement facial recognition for passengers departing from international airports to identify people who overstay their visa.

Together with fingerprint and face recognition, iris scanning is one of three biometric identification technologies internationally standardised since 2006 by the International Civil Aviation Organization (ICAO) for use in e-passports and the United Arab Emirates conducts iris scanning on visitors who need to apply for a visa. The United States Department of Homeland Security has announced plans to greatly increase the biometric data it collects at US borders. In 2018, Singapore began trials of iris scanning at three land and maritime immigration checkpoints.

== Statistics ==
The top destination of colombian citizens going abroad are the following:

| Country | 2024* |
|---|---|
| United States | 2,900,215 |
| Spain | 1,275,439 |
| Mexico | 959,073 |
| Panama | 954,624 |
| Dominican Republic | 579,830 |
| Ecuador | 356,196 |
| Chile | 337,737 |
| Peru | 319,803 |
| Brazil | 196,750 |
| Venezuela | 178,488 |
| Canada | 178,186 |
| Argentina | 144,616 |
| Aruba | 137,487 |
| France | 127,465 |
| Total | 9,714,283 |
*Up to november 2024 according to Migración Colombia.

== See also ==
- Visa policy of Colombia
- Colombian passport
