= Colombian identity card =

Colombian identification document

Citizenship Card Cédula de Ciudadanía (Spanish)
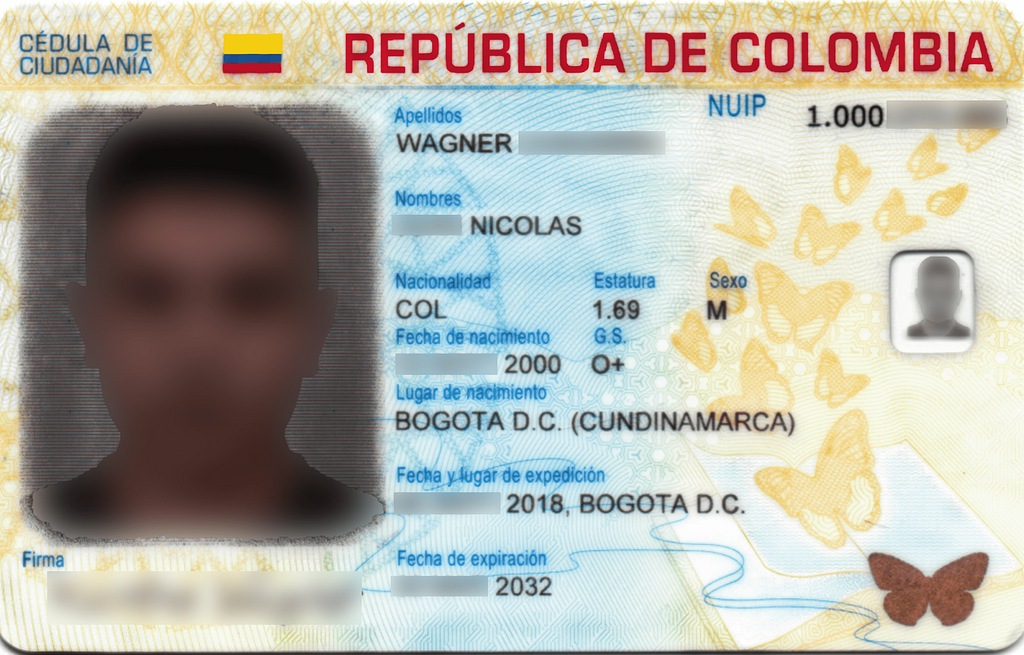
- Specimen of the credit-card sized Colombian identity card issued since 1 December 2020.
- Type: Identity card, optional replacement for passport in the listed countries
- Issued by: Colombia
- First issued: Biometric card: December 1, 2020; 5 years ago; Previous generation: January 1, 2000; 26 years ago
- Valid in: Colombia; Andean Community; Mercosur (except Guyana and Suriname)
- Expiration: 10 years (biometric); None (previous generation)
- Cost: First time - Free (everybody); Duplicate – $63 050 COP / $63.13 USD / €58.52 EUR
- Size: Length (5.5 cm); Width (8.8 cm)

The Colombian Identity Card (Spanish: Documento de Identidad Colombiano, pronounced [dokuˈmento ðejðentiˈðað kolomˈbjano], also known as Cédula de Ciudadanía) is the identity document issued by local registry offices in Colombia and by diplomatic missions abroad to every Colombian citizen over 18 years of age. Minors are issued an identity card or "Tarjeta de Identidad”. It is the only valid identification document for all civil, political, administrative, and judicial acts, as mandated by Colombian Law 39 of 1961. The cards are produced and issued by the National Civil Registry.

== History ==
On November 24, 1952, the first Citizenship Certificate was issued to the then-President of the Republic, Laureano Gómez Castro with the serial number 1.

Later, in 1954, women gained the right to vote and to stand for election. The first female identity card was issued on May 25, 1956, to Doña Carola Correa de Rojas Pinilla, wife of then- President of Colombia, Gustavo Rojas Pinilla, with the serial number 20,000,001. This document was known as the "Blanca Laminada" or White Laminated Card.

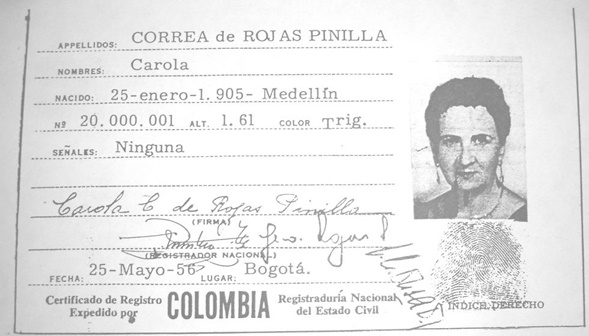
First female identity document.

In 1993, a brown plastic identification card was introduced, omitting previous details like skin color and distinguishing marks, and adding new information, including blood type, gender, and a barcode. Since May 2000, the updated identity document, known as "Amarilla con hologramas" (Yellow with Holograms), has been issued, incorporating AFIS (Automated Fingerprint Identification System) technology. During this transition, both the earlier white and brown formats remained valid and were recognized as legitimate forms of citizen identification.

In 2003, the format of the Personal Identification Number (PIN) was updated. Previously, individuals received an identity card number as minors and were assigned a different number upon turning 18. Starting that year, an alphabetical prefix was introduced to the identity card number. Then, in 2004, the PIN system was replaced by the NUIP (Unique Personal Identity Number), which assigns each citizen a lifelong, unique identifier. The new NUIP numbering began at 1,000,000,000. Citizens who had been issued an identity card before 2003 retained their original number.

In 2005, following a series of bureaucratic and technical challenges, the National Registry of Civil Status of Colombia issued a decree establishing that, as of January 1, 2010, only identity documents issued since 2000—the yellow card with holograms—would be considered valid. This deadline was subsequently extended to July 31, 2010.

In 2020, a new electronic identity document was announced, which began to be issued on December 1 of the same year. The document allows citizens to identify themselves and carry out procedures without the need for a physical document. The electronic document can be stored on any smartphone device through the National Civil Registry's app, available on Android and iOS devices.

== Obtaining a citizen card ==
Colombian citizens can obtain a citizenship card by visiting a Colombian registry or consular office with a prior form of identification, such as a birth certificate, naturalization letter, registration resolution (if Colombian by adoption), or the "tarjeta de identidad," which is issued to minors.

Applicants must be at least 18 years old. Additional requirements include three color photographs (4 cm x 5 cm) against a white background, though some registry offices within Colombia may not require these. Applicants must also provide their blood type and RH factor. For individuals with light-colored hair or bald heads, photos must be taken against a blue background. The service is free for first-time applicants. However, those requesting a duplicate due to theft, incorrect information, loss, or damage must provide the same documentation and pay a fee of COP $55,750.

This document is mandatory for all Colombian citizens over the age of 18 residing in Colombia and for those seeking consular assistance abroad. Upon completing the application process, a provisional document called the “contraseña” (English: password) is issued. This temporary document includes the citizen's photo, fingerprint, name, and NUIP (Unique Personal Identification Number). Delivery times for the official citizenship card vary, typically ranging from one to three months, depending on the office where the application was submitted.

Military and police authorities may request the document. According to Article 35, clause 3 of the National Police Code: "The following behaviors negatively impact relations between citizens and authorities and therefore should be avoided. Engaging in such behaviors will result in corrective measures: (...) Obstructing, hindering, or resisting identification or individualization procedures by police authorities.".

A general fine of type 4 may be imposed, along with participation in a community program or an educational activity focused on coexistence. However, failure to carry the document is not considered a criminal offense.

== International travel ==
Holders of a Colombian identification document can enter without a passport in all member countries of the Union of South American Nations with the exception of Suriname, Guyana and Venezuela. This includes:

Andean Community (CAN):

- Peru
- Bolivia
- Ecuador

Mercosur (Southern Common Market) Member and associated states:

- Argentina
- Brazil
- Chile
- Paraguay
- Uruguay

== Current identity card for adults ==
=== Electronic identity document (2020-present) ===
The electronic identity card has been issued since December 2020, replacing the previous iteration which was yellow with holograms. It expires every 10 years.

This new form of identification can also be stored on any smartphone that runs on Android or iOS operating systems using the Registry's app. It has the same validity as its physical counterpart.

==== Characteristics ====
- Material: Polycarbonate
- Length: 5.5 cm
- Width: 8.8 cm

==== Front ====
The header consists of the inscriptions "CÉDULA DE CIUDADANÍA" and "REPÚBLICA DE COLOMBIA,” a small Colombian flag, in the lower right corner there is a butterfly that changes color gold/green.

The background, mainly yellow and sky blue, consists of geometric patterns with relief, curves, a book and thirteen butterflies. The following information is found.

- Photo of the person
- NUIP (Número Único de Identidad Personal / Unique Personal Identification Number)
- Last name(s)
- First name(s)
- Nationality
- Height
- Sex
- Photo window
- Date of birth
- Blood type and RH
- Place of birth
- Date and place of issue
- Signature
- Expiration date

==== Back ====
The header consists of the inscription ".CO” which is the domain name of the country. The background, mostly yellow and sky blue, consists of geometric patterns, curves, and the Iglesia de San Pedro Claver, Cartagena. On the back is the following information.

- Serial number
- Signature of the National Registry
- Biometric QR code
- Three-line data machine-readable zone with identification document number

==== Security measures ====
Unlike the yellow with holograms card, this format does not include printing of the right index. However, in order to be issued to Colombian citizens, fingerprints and biometric data are taken and stored.

The QR code uses ABIS (Automated Biometric Identification System - Sistema automático de identificación por biometrías) technology that allows government entities to verify the identity of the bearer of the document by accessing the citizen's biometric database.

== Formats of previous identity documents ==
=== Yellow with holograms identity card (2000-2020) ===
The yellow with holograms card was issued in May 2000, replacing all previous iterations of the document. Despite no longer being issued as of 2020, it is still considered a valid document. Unlike the electronic card, the yellow with holograms card has no expiration date.

==== Characteristics ====
- Material: Plastic
- Length: 5.5 cm
- Width: 8.8 cm

==== Front ====
The header consists of the inscriptions "REPÚBLICA DE COLOMBIA,” "IDENTIFICACIÓN PERSONAL" and "CÉDULA DE CIUDADANÍA.” The background, mostly yellow, with gray and pink, consists of curved patterns and the country's coat of arms inscribed in a circle; it has holograms that show the emblem of the registry and the phrase "REPÚBLICA DE COLOMBIA.” On the front face you will find the following information.

- Photo of the person
- NUIP (Número Único de Identidad Personal / Unique Personal Identification Number)
- Last name(s)
- First name(s)
- Electronic signature

==== Back ====
It has no header. The background, mostly yellow and pink, consists of curved patterns, and the Registrar's emblem inscribed in a white circle. On the back is the following information.

- Fingerprint of the right index finger
- Date of birth
- Place of birth
- Height
- Blood type and RH
- Sex
- Date and place of issue
- Signature of the National Registry
- Bar matrix with citizen information

==== Biometrics ====
This format includes printing of the right index. However, in order to be issued to Colombian citizens, fingerprints and biometric data are taken and stored.

The matrix uses AFIS (Automated Fingerprint Identification System) technology that allows government entities to verify the identity of the bearer of the card by comparing the citizen's fingerprints.

=== Brown laminated identity card (1993-2000) ===
The brown laminated identity card, which was first issued since 1993, stopped being produced in 2000 when the yellow with holograms card was introduced. The brown laminated card has not been valid since August 1, 2010.

==== Characteristics ====
- Material: Plastic
- Length: 5.5 cm
- Width: 8.8 cm

==== Front ====
The header consists of the inscriptions "REPÚBLICA DE COLOMBIA,” "IDENTIFICACIÓN PERSONAL" and "CÉDULA DE CIUDADANÍA.” The background is white and consists of brown patterns and the coat of arms of the country with ornaments. It obtains the following information:

- Black and white photo of the person
- NUIP (Número Único de Identidad Personal / Unique Personal Identification Number)
- Last name(s)
- First name(s)
- Signature of cardholder

==== Back ====
It has no header. The background is white and consists of a brown pattern, and the emblem of the Registrar's Office is inscribed in a white circle. On the back is the following information.

- Ink print of the right index finger
- Date of birth
- Place of birth
- Height
- Blood type and RH
- Sex
- Date and place of expedition
- Signature of the National Registry
- Barcode with citizen information

==== Biometrics ====
This format includes printing of the right index fingerprint in ink.

=== White laminated identity card (1952-1993) ===
The white laminated card was used from 1952 to 1993, when the brown laminated one was introduced. It has not been valid since August 2010.

==== Characteristics ====
- Material: Paper
- Length: 5.5 cm
- Width: 8.8 cm

==== Front ====
The header consists of the inscriptions "REPÚBLICA DE COLOMBIA" and "CEDULA DE CIUDADANÍA.” The background is white and has the country's coat of arms printed in green ink. On the front face you will find the following information.

- Black and white photo of the person
- Personal identification number
- Place of issue
- Last name(s)
- First name(s)
- Date and place of birth
- Height
- Skin color
- Signals
- Signature of cardholder
- Signature of the National Registry
- Ink print of the right index finger

==== Biometrics ====
This format includes printing of the right index.

=== Electoral Certificate ===
The "electoral certificate" was issued to people over 21 years of age from February 1, 1935. It is mandatory to present this document for electoral purposes, according to Law 31 of 1929, in all those civil and political acts in which that personal identification was necessary.

== Identity card for minors ==
=== Sky blue identity card (2014-present) ===
This is an identity card issued to minors (those under the age of 18), which can be obtained from age 7. It is only valid for identification purposes and cannot be used to vote, unlike the adult identity card. This is the current format.

==== Characteristics ====
- Material: Plastic
- Length: 5.5 cm
- Width: 8.8 cm

==== Front ====
The header consists of the inscriptions "REPÚBLICA DE COLOMBIA,” "IDENTIFICACIÓN PERSONAL" and "TARJETA DE IDENTIDAD.” The background, sky blue with orange, consists of curved patterns; has a green/yellow color shift image. On the front face you will find the following information.

- Photo of the person
- NUIP (Número único de identidad personal / Unique Personal Identification Number)
- Last name(s)
- First name(s)
- Electronic signature

==== Back ====
It has no header. The background, the same color as the front, consists of curved patterns, and the emblem of the Registry's Office inscribed in a gray circle. On the back is the following information.

- Digital printing of the right index finger
- Date of birth
- Place of birth
- Blood type and RH
- Sex
- Date and place of issue
- Signature of the National Registrar
- Bar matrix with citizen information

==== Biometrics ====
This format includes digital printing of the right index.

=== Pink Identity Card (?-2014) ===
This version of the identity card for minors was issued until 2014.

==== Characteristics ====
- Material: Paper
- Length: 5 cm
- Width: 9 cm

==== Front ====
The header consists of the inscriptions "REPÚBLICA DE COLOMBIA" and "TARJETA DE IDENTIDAD.” The pink background, consists of patterns of curves. On the front face you will find the following information.

- NUIP (Número único de identidad personal / Unique Personal Identification Number)
- Last name(s)
- First name(s)
- Sex
- Date and place of birth
- Blood type and RH
- Date and place of issue

==== Back ====
The heading consists of the inscription "REGISTRADURÍA NACIONAL DEL ESTADO CIVIL.” The background is white. On the back is the following information.

- Signature of the Municipal Registrar
- Color photograph of the person
- Ink impression of the right index finger

==== Biometrics ====
This format includes printing of the right index.

== Identity card for foreigners ==
The identity document (cédula de ciudadanía) and the identity card are exclusively for Colombian citizens. There is an identity document for foreigners with long-term visas, the foreigner identity document (cédula de extranjería) issued by Colombia Migration as an identification document. This document allows the exercise of the rights to which the foreigner is entitled on Colombian soil, which are the same as the Colombian citizen, except to vote in elections and to run for government positions, and if the foreigner in question holds a resident visa, they are able to exercise their vote in municipal, district and council elections.

=== Foreign Identity Document (documento de identidad de extranjería/cédula de extranjería) ===
The foreign identity document is issued by Colombia Migration to foreigners who will reside in the country for more than 90 days or have a migrant or resident visa. In specific cases it may be issued to foreigners with a visitor's visa. This document can be issued to minors from age 7. In this case, the foreign identity document will have the annotation “menores de edad” under the cardholder's photo. The numbering of the document is sometimes similar to those with citizenship cards and sometimes there are cases in which they have the same identification numbers, which can cause problems due to the duplication of information on Colombian databases.

This document does not provide information regarding place of birth and place of issue. Unlike the citizenship card, the date of issue changes every time the foreign identity card is renewed or when turning 18. The identification number on a foreign identity cards is assigned based on the Biographical Archive of Foreign Migration Colombia and is assigned as a “historial de extranjero” (foreign record) at the time of issuing a safe-conduct or starting any administrative process, or at the time of the individual's first visa registration by the Foreign Ministry.

==== Characteristics ====
- Material: Polycarbonate
- Length: 5.5 cm
- Width: 8.8 cm

==== Front ====
The header consists of the inscription "COL" (Colombia's acronym for ICAO), "REPÚBLICA DE COLOMBIA" and "Cédula de Extranjería.” The purple background with soft shades of yellow and white consists of circle patterns, and on the right side it shows the facade of the Casa de Nariño. It has a round hologram in the middle of the document, with the coat of arms of Colombia and the logo of Colombia Migration. On the front face it has the following information:

- Photo of the person
- Type of visa (visitor, migrant or resident)
- Foreigner Identity Document Number
- Last name(s)
- First name(s)
- Nationality (In ICAO acronym)
- Date of birth (In YYYY/MM/DD format)
- Sex
- Blood type y RH
- Issue date (changes with each update) and expiration date
- If the cardholder is a minor, an inscription that says “menor de edad” will be displayed under the photo
- Electronic signature
- Right index

==== Back ====
- Bar Matrix with holder information (it does not have the same structure as that of an identity document with holograms, so it is incompatible in most of the applications that are used)
- Lateral barcode with number for internal use
- Legend in Spanish and English regarding the duty of the holder to notify Colombian Migration of any change in status or immigration information
- Signature of the Director of Migration Colombia
- [www.migracioncolombia.gov.co Official website of Colombian Migration]
- Machine-readable zone

== See also ==
- Identity document
- Colombian passport
- Electronic identification
- German identity card
- Documento Nacional de Identidad (Spain)
- Electronic signature
- Digital signature
