= Visa requirements for Marshall Islands citizens =

Administrative entry restrictions

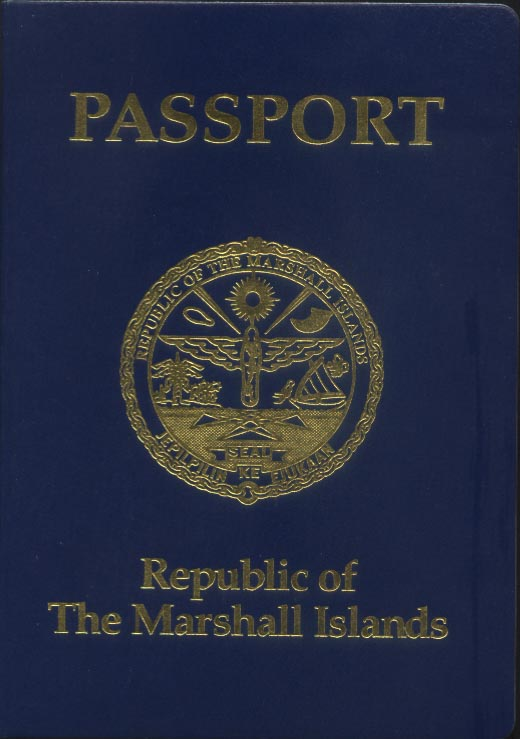
A Marshallese passport

Visa requirements for Marshall Islands citizens are administrative entry restrictions by the authorities of other states placed on citizens of Marshall Islands. As of 2026, Marshallese citizens had visa-free or visa on arrival access to 127 countries and territories, ranking the Marshallese passport 36th in terms of travel freedom according to the Henley Passport Index.

Marshall Islands signed a mutual visa waiver agreement with Schengen Area countries on 28 June 2016.

== Visa requirements map ==
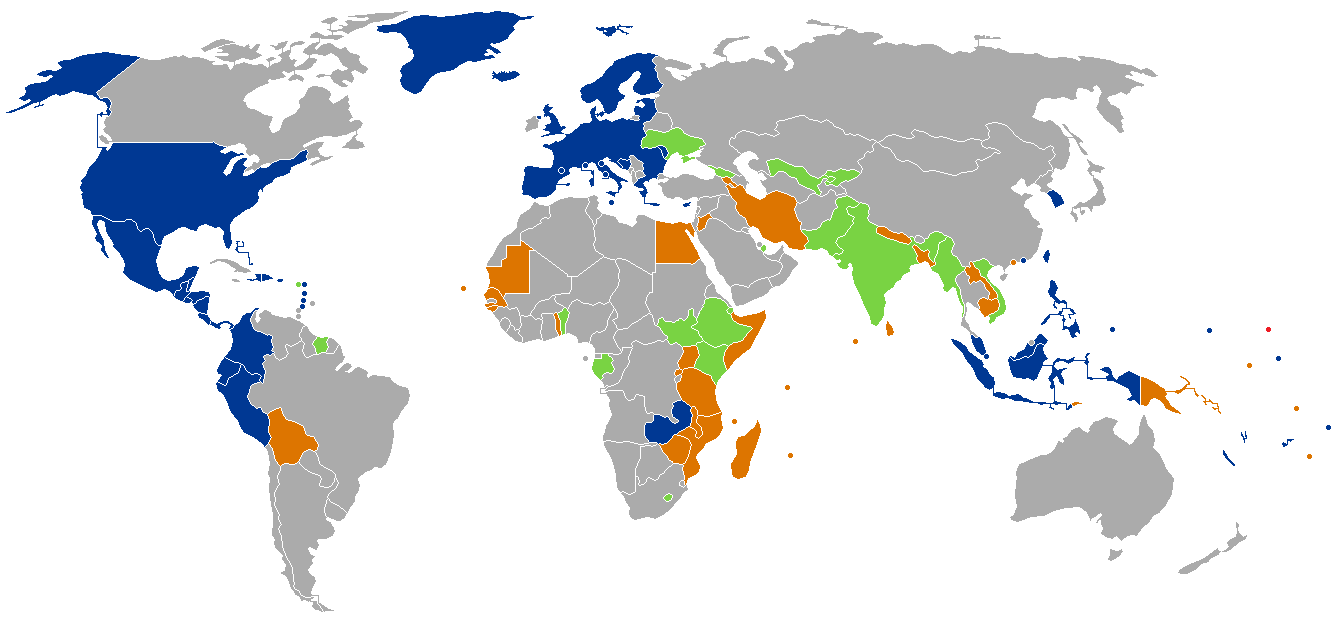
Visa requirements for Marshall Islands citizens Marshall Islands Visa-free Visa on arrival eVisa Visa required

== Visa requirements ==
Country	Visa requirement	Allowed stay	Notes (excluding departure fees)
Afghanistan	eVisa	30 days	Visa is not required in case born in Afghanistan or can proof that one of their parents is a national of Afghanistan or born in Afghanistan.; e-Visa : Visitors must arrive at Kabul International (KBL).
Albania	eVisa		90 days visa free if hold a valid, multiple-entry and previously used visa or a residence permit issued by a Schengen area country, United States, Cyprus, Ireland or the United Kingdom
Algeria	Visa required		
Andorra	Visa not required	90 days	Although no visa requirements exist, apply the relevant regulations of France or Spain, whichever must be transited to reach Andorra
Angola	Visa not required	30 days	Maximum 3 entries per calendar year
Antigua and Barbuda	Visa not required	180 days	
Argentina	Visa required		The AVE (High Speed Travel) is open to Marshall Islands citizens holding valid, current ordinary passports traveling to Argentina for tourism. To do so, they must hold a valid category B2/J/B1/O/P (P1-P2-P3)/E/H-1B visa issued by the United States of America.
Armenia	eVisa	120 days	120 days visa on arrival if hold a valid visa or valid permanent resident permit (resident card) issued by Australia, Belarus, Canada, Gulf Cooperation Council countries, Japan, New Zealand, Russia, Singapore, South Korea, European Union / Schengen Area member states, United Kingdom or United States
Australia and territories	Visa required		May apply online (Online Visitor e600 visa).; Transit visa is not required.
Austria	Visa not required	90 days	90 days within any 180 day period in the Schengen Area
Azerbaijan	Visa required		
Bahamas	Visa not required	3 months	
Bahrain	eVisa / Visa on arrival	2 weeks	
Bangladesh	Visa on arrival	30 days	
Barbados	Visa not required	90 days	
Belarus	Visa required		
Belgium	Visa not required	90 days	90 days within any 180 day period in the Schengen Area
Belize	Visa not required		
Benin	eVisa	30 days	Must have an international vaccination certificate.
Bhutan	eVisa	90 days	Must pay Sustainable Development Fee
Bolivia	eVisa / Visa on arrival	90 days	
Bosnia and Herzegovina	Visa not required	90 days	
Botswana	eVisa		
Brazil	Visa required		
Brunei	Visa required		
Bulgaria	Visa not required	90 days	90 days within any 180 day period in the Schengen Area
Burkina Faso	eVisa		
Burundi	Visa on arrival	30 days	May Apply online
Cambodia	Visa on arrival /eVisa	30 days	
Cameroon	eVisa		
Canada	Visa required		
Cape Verde	Visa on arrival		Requirement to register online 5 days before arrival
Central African Republic	Visa required		
Chad	eVisa	90 days	
Chile	Visa required		
China	Visa required		
Colombia	Visa not required	180 days	90 days – extendable up to 180-days stay within a one-year period
Comoros	Visa on arrival	45 days	
Republic of the Congo	Visa required		
Democratic Republic of the Congo	eVisa	7 days	
Costa Rica	Visa not required	30 days	
Côte d'Ivoire	eVisa	90 days	
Croatia	Visa not required	90 days	90 days within any 180 day period in the Schengen Area
Cuba	eVisa	90 days	
Cyprus	Visa not required	90 days	90 days within any 180 day period
Czech Republic	Visa not required	90 days	90 days within any 180 day period in the Schengen Area
Denmark	Visa not required	90 days	90 days within any 180 day period in the Schengen Area
Djibouti	eVisa	31 days	
Dominica	Visa not required	21 days	
Dominican Republic	Visa not required	30 days	
Ecuador	Visa not required	90 days	
Egypt	Visa on arrival	30 days	
El Salvador	Visa not required	90 days	
Equatorial Guinea	eVisa		Must arrive via Malabo International Airport, processing fee 75 USD
Eritrea	Visa required		
Estonia	Visa not required	90 days	90 days within any 180 day period in the Schengen Area
Eswatini	Visa required		
Ethiopia	eVisa	up to 90 days	eVisa holders must arrive via Addis Ababa Bole International Airport
Fiji	Visa not required	4 months	
Finland	Visa not required	90 days	90 days within any 180 day period in the Schengen Area
France	Visa not required	90 days	90 days within any 180 day period in the Schengen Area
Gabon	eVisa		Must arrive via Libreville International Airport in Libreville
Gambia	Visa required		
Georgia	eVisa	90 days	
Germany	Visa not required	90 days	90 days within any 180 day period in the Schengen Area
Ghana	Visa required		
Greece	Visa not required	90 days	90 days within any 180 day period in the Schengen Area
Grenada	Visa required		
Guatemala	Visa not required	90 days	
Guinea	eVisa	90 days	
Guinea-Bissau	Visa on arrival	90 days	
Guyana	Visa required		
Haiti	Visa not required	90 days	
Honduras	Visa not required	90 days	
Hungary	Visa not required	90 days	90 days within any 180 day period in the Schengen Area
Iceland	Visa not required	90 days	90 days within any 180 day period in the Schengen Area
India	e-Visa	30 days	e-Visa holders must arrive via 32 designated airports (Note: Ahmedabad; Amritsar; Bagdogra; Bengaluru; Bhubaneswar; Chandigarh; Chennai; Coimbatore; Delhi; Gaya; Goa-Dabolim; Goa-Manohar; Guwahati; Hyderabad; Indore; Jaipur; Kannur; Kochi; Kolkata; Kozhikode; Lucknow; Madurai; Mangaluru; Mumbai; Nagpur; Port Blair; Pune; Surat; Thiruvananthapuram; Tiruchirappalli; Varanasi; Visakhapatnam) or 5 designated seaports. (Note: Chennai; Cochin; Mormugao (Goa); Mumbai; Mangalore); An Indian e-Tourist Visa may only be obtained twice within 1 calendar year.; Foreigners of Pakistani origin or who hold a Pakistani Passport are not eligible for an e-Visa. Foreigners who are not Pakistani nationals, but whose parents or grandparents (either paternal or maternal) were born in, or were permanent residents in Pakistan, are also not eligible for an e-Visa.
Indonesia	Visa required		
Iran	eVisa / Visa on arrival	30 days	
Iraq	eVisa		
Ireland	Visa required		Travel between Ireland and Northern Ireland is technically possible
Israel	Electronic Travel Authorization	90 days	
Italy	Visa not required	90 days	90 days within any 180 day period in the Schengen Area
Jamaica	Visa required		
Japan	Visa required		Eligible for an e-Visa if residing in one these countries Australia, Brazil, Cambodia, Canada, India, Saudi Arabia, Singapore, South Africa, Taiwan, United Arab Emirates, United Kingdom, United States.; May apply online
Jordan	eVisa / Visa on arrival	30 days	* Visa can be obtained upon arrival, it will cost a total of 40 JOD, obtainable at most international ports of entry and land border crossings (except King Hussein/Allenby Bridge).
Kazakhstan	eVisa		
Kenya	Electronic Travel Authorization	3 months	Applications can be submitted up to 90 days prior to travel and must be submitted at least 3 days in advance.; eTA fee is USD 32.50.; eTA is good for single entry, but visitors who leave Kenya to other EAC countries may re-enter provided that their eTA is still valid; Proof of reservation at the hotel where visitors plan to stay is required (if staying with friends, an invitation letter is also acceptable).; Yellow fever vaccination certificate is required if coming from endemic countries.; Can also be entered on an East Africa tourist visa issued by Rwanda or Uganda.
Kiribati	Visa not required	90 days	90 days during calendar year
North Korea	Visa required		
South Korea	Visa not required	30 days	
Kuwait	Visa required		e-Visa can be obtained for holders of a Residence Permit issued by a GCC member state under the following conditions: To be 18 years old and over.; The residence permit for a GCC state must be valid for at least another 3 months.; To be accompanied by the sponsor of the residence permit if the sponsor is an individual.; Does not apply to holders of a GCC Student Visa and Non-Skilled Worker Visa
Kyrgyzstan	eVisa	60 days	
Laos	eVisa / Visa on arrival	30 days	18 (Note: Savannakhet Airport; Lanetoui - Mengkang (China); Meuangmom - Wan Pong (Myanmar); Banvang - Ban Khok Phai (Thailand); Namngeun - Huay Kon (Thailand); Paksan - Bueng Kan (Thailand); Paktaphan - Pak Saeng (Thailand); Pangmon - Ban Huak (Thailand); Phoudou (Thailand); Dak ta ock - Nam Giang (Vietnam); La Lai (Vietnam); Namkan (Vietnam); Namphao - Cau Treo (Vietnam); Namsoy - Na Meo (Vietnam); Naphao - Cha Lo (Vietnam); Pahang - Long Sap (Vietnam); Panghok - Tây Trang (Vietnam); Phoukeua - Bo Y (Vietnam)) of the 33 border crossings are only open to regular visa holders.; e-Visa may be used to enter Laos through the Luang Prabang, Pakse and Vientiane international airports, 3 Thai-Lao Friendship Bridges (Note: Vientiane (Friendship Bridge 1); Savannakhet (Friendship Bridge 2); Bokeo (Friendship Bridge 4)), in Boten (road and railroad), and in Vientiane (at Khamsavath railway station).; Visa on arrival is available at the Luang Prabang, Pakse and Vientiane international airports, 4 Thai-Lao Friendship Bridges (Note: Vientiane (Friendship Bridge 1); Savannakhet (Friendship Bridge 2); Khammouane (Friendship Bridge 3); Bokeo (Friendship Bridge 4)) and 7 border crossings. (Note: Nongnokkheane - Trapeang Kriel (Cambodia); Boten - Bo han (China); Golden Triangle/Samliemkham (Thailand); Khamsavath railway station (Thailand); Namheuang - Ban Na Kraseng (Thailand); Vang tao - Chongmek (Thailand); Dansavan - Lao Bảo (Vietnam))
Latvia	Visa not required	90 days	90 days within any 180 day period in the Schengen Area
Lebanon	Visa required		
Lesotho	eVisa	44 days	
Liberia	eVisa		
Libya	eVisa	30 days	
Liechtenstein	Visa not required	90 days	90 days within any 180 day period in the Schengen Area
Lithuania	Visa not required	90 days	90 days within any 180 day period in the Schengen Area
Luxembourg	Visa not required	90 days	90 days within any 180 day period in the Schengen Area
Madagascar	eVisa / Visa on arrival	90 days	
Malawi	eVisa / Visa on arrival	30 days	
Malaysia	Visa not required	30 days	
Maldives	Visa on arrival	30 days	
Mali	Visa required		
Malta	Visa not required	90 days	90 days within any 180 day period in the Schengen Area
Mauritania	eVisa		
Mauritius	Visa on arrival	60 days	
Mexico	Visa not required	180 days	
Micronesia	Visa not required	1 year	
Moldova	Visa not required	90 days	90 days within any 180 day period
Monaco	Visa not required		
Mongolia	eVisa		
Montenegro	Visa not required	90 days	
Morocco	Visa required		May apply for an e-Visa if holding a valid visa or a residency document issued by one of the following countries: Schengen Area, Australia, Canada, Ireland, New Zealand, United Kingdom, United States a residency document issued by Cyprus, Japan, United Arab Emirates.
Mozambique	Visa on arrival /eVisa	30 days	
Myanmar	eVisa	28 days	
Namibia	eVisa		
Nauru	Free visa on arrival		
Nepal	Visa on arrival /eVisa	90 days	
Netherlands	Visa not required	90 days	90 days within any 180 day period in the Schengen Area
New Zealand	Visa required		International Visitor Conservation and Tourism Levy not required.; May transit without visa if transit is through Auckland Airport and for no longer than 24 hours, subject to meeting character requirements and obtaining an Electronic Travel Authority prior to departure.; Holders of an Australian Permanent Resident Visa or Resident Return Visa may be granted a New Zealand Resident Visa on arrival permitting indefinite stay (pursuant to the Trans-Tasman Travel Arrangement), subject to meeting character requirements and obtaining an Electronic Travel Authority prior to departure.
Nicaragua	Visa not required	90 days	
Niger	Visa required		
Nigeria	eVisa		
North Macedonia	Visa required		Visa is not required for stays upto 15 days if holding a valid multiple entry visa of Canada, the United States, United Kingdom, Schengen Area member state, or residence permit of Schengen Area member state.
Norway	Visa not required	90 days	90 days within any 180 day period in the Schengen Area
Oman	Visa required		
Pakistan	Online Visa		
Palau	Visa not required	1 year	
Panama	Visa not required	90 days	
Papua New Guinea	eVisa / Free visa on arrival	60 days	
Paraguay	Visa required		
Peru	Visa not required	90 days	
Philippines	Visa not required	30 days	
Poland	Visa not required	90 days	90 days within any 180 day period in the Schengen Area
Portugal	Visa not required	90 days	90 days within any 180 day period in the Schengen Area
Qatar	eVisa		
Romania	Visa not required	90 days	90 days within any 180 day period in the Schengen Area
Russia	Visa required		
Rwanda	eVisa / Visa on arrival	30 days	May apply online.; Can also be entered on an East Africa tourist visa issued by Kenya or Uganda
Saint Kitts and Nevis	Electronic Travel Authorisation	3 months	
Saint Lucia	Visa not required	6 weeks	
Saint Vincent and the Grenadines	Visa not required	3 months	
Samoa	Visa not required	60 days	
San Marino	Visa not required		
São Tomé and Príncipe	eVisa	15 days	
Saudi Arabia	Visa required		Tourist visa on arrival for holders of a valid multiple entry visa from US, UK or Schengen area, under the condition that the multiple entry visa has been used at least once, proving that by showing the entry and exit stamps of the country of issuance.
Senegal	Visa on arrival	1 month	
Serbia	Visa required		90 days visa free if hold a valid visa issued by Ireland or permanent residence of the Cyprus, Ireland, Schengen Area member states, United Kingdom or the United States
Seychelles	Visitor's Permit on arrival	90 days	
Sierra Leone	eVisa		
Singapore	Visa not required	30 days	
Slovakia	Visa not required	90 days	90 days within any 180 day period in the Schengen Area
Slovenia	Visa not required	90 days	90 days within any 180 day period in the Schengen Area
Solomon Islands	Free visa on arrival	3 months	3 months within any calendar year period, free of charge
Somalia	eVisa	30 days	
South Africa	Visa required		
South Sudan	eVisa		Obtainable online; Printed visa authorization must be presented at the time of travel
Spain	Visa not required	90 days	90 days within any 180 day period in the Schengen Area
Sri Lanka	ETA/ Visa on arrival	30 days	The standard visitor visa allows a stay of 60 days within any 6-month period.; Visa fees (for Standard visitor visa): SAARC - USD 35; Non SAARC - USD 75; e-Visa categories will be charged an additional USD 18.50 service fee.; If transiting from any of the Sri Lankan airports, An e-Visa is exempted (2 day transit period).
Sudan	Visa required		
Suriname	Visa not required	90 days	However, an entry fee of USD 50 or 50 euro is required to be paid online prior to arrival
Sweden	Visa not required	90 days	90 days within any 180 day period in the Schengen Area
Switzerland	Visa not required	90 days	90 days within any 180 day period in the Schengen Area
Syria	eVisa		
Tajikistan	Visa not required	30 days	60 days eVisa also available.
Tanzania	eVisa / Visa on arrival		
Thailand	eVisa		
Timor-Leste	Visa on arrival	30 days	At Presidente Nicolau Lobato International Airport or the Dili Sea Port only.
Togo	eVisa	15 days	
Tonga	Visa on arrival	31 days	
Trinidad and Tobago	Visa required		
Tunisia	Visa required		
Turkey	Visa required		
Turkmenistan	Visa required		
Tuvalu	Visa on arrival	1 month	
Uganda	Visa on arrival / eVisa	3 months	
Ukraine	eVisa		
United Arab Emirates	eVisa		Visitors may obtain a visa online through an airline if they are arriving on Air Arabia, Air Astana, Emirates, Etihad Airways (and Air Baltic, Air Serbia, flydubai, Turkish Airlines and IndiGo; May apply online.; May apply also using 'Smart service'.
United Kingdom and Crown dependencies	Electronic Travel Authorisation	6 months	
United States and territories	Visa not required		Under the Compact of Free Association visa exemption applies to citizens by birth, former citizens of the Trust Territory of the Pacific Islands who were citizens in 1986, naturalized spouses, children and naturalized citizens who are residents for at least 5 years and does not apply to those who obtained passports through investment or passport sale.
Uruguay	Visa required		
Uzbekistan	eVisa	30 days	
Vanuatu	Visa not required	90 days	
Vatican City	Visa not required		
Venezuela	Visa required		Introduction of Electronic Visa System for Tourist and Business Travelers.
Vietnam	eVisa	90 days	30 days visa free when visit Phu Quoc Island
Yemen	Visa required		
Zambia	Visa not required	90 days	90 days as tourists or 30 days for business
Zimbabwe	eVisa / Visa on arrival	3 months	

== Dependent, Disputed, or Restricted territories ==
Unrecognized or partially recognized countries

Territory	Conditions of access	Notes
Abkhazia	Visa required	
Kosovo	Visa not required	90 days
Northern Cyprus	Visa not required	
Palestine	Visa not required	Arrival by sea to Gaza Strip not allowed.
Sahrawi Arab Democratic Republic		Undefined visa regime in the Western Sahara controlled territory.
Somaliland	Visa on arrival	30 days for 30 US dollars, payable on arrival.
South Ossetia	Visa not required	Multiple entry visa to Russia and three day prior notification are required to enter South Ossetia.
Taiwan	Visa not required	90 days from 19 November 2018; Visa exemption applies for persons who acquired Marshallese citizenship at birth only.
Transnistria	Visa not required	Registration required after 24h.

Dependent and autonomous territories

Territory	Conditions of access	Notes
China
Hong Kong	Visa not required	14 days
Macau	Visa on arrival	30 days
Denmark
Faroe Islands	Visa not required	
Greenland	Visa not required	
France
French Guiana	Visa required	
French Polynesia	Visa not required	
(France) French West Indies	Visa required	Includes overseas departments of Guadeloupe and Martinique and overseas collectivities of Saint Barthélemy and Saint Martin.
Mayotte	Visa required	
New Caledonia	Visa not required	
Réunion	Visa required	
Saint Pierre and Miquelon	Visa required	
Wallis and Futuna	Visa not required	
Netherlands
Aruba	Visa required	
Caribbean Netherlands	Visa required	Includes Bonaire, Sint Eustatius and Saba.
Curaçao	Visa required	
Sint Maarten	Visa required	
New Zealand
Cook Islands	Visa not required	31 days
Niue	Visa not required	30 days
Tokelau	Visa required	
United Kingdom
Akrotiri and Dhekelia	Visa not required	Stays longer than 28 days per 12-month period require a permit.
Anguilla	Visa not required	3 months
Bermuda	Visa not required	6 months
British Indian Ocean Territory	Special permit required	Special permit required.
British Virgin Islands	Visa not required	1 month
Cayman Islands	Visa required	
Falkland Islands	Visa required	
Gibraltar	Visa not required	6 months
Montserrat	Visa not required	6 months
Pitcairn Islands	Visa not required	14 days visa free and landing fee US$35 or tax of US$5 if not going ashore.
Ascension Island	eVisa	3 months within any year period
Saint Helena	Visitor's Pass required	Visitor's Pass granted on arrival valid for 4/10/21/60/90 days for 12/14/16/20/25 pound sterling.
Tristan da Cunha	Permission required	Permission to land required for 15/30 pounds sterling (yacht/ship passenger) for Tristan da Cunha Island or 20 pounds sterling for Gough Island, Inaccessible Island or Nightingale Islands.
South Georgia and the South Sandwich Islands	Permit required	Pre-arrival permit from the Commissioner required (72 hours/1 month for 110/160 pounds sterling).
Turks and Caicos Islands	Visa required	Holders of a valid visa issued by Canada, United Kingdom or the USA do not required a visa for a maximum stay of 90 days.
United States
American Samoa	Electronic authorization	
Guam	Visa not required	
Northern Mariana Islands	Visa not required	
Puerto Rico	Visa not required	
U.S. Virgin Islands	Visa not required	
Antarctica and adjacent islands
Special permits required for Bouvet Island, British Antarctic Territory, French Southern and Antarctic Lands, Argentine Antarctica, (Australia) Australian Antarctic Territory, (Antártica Chilena Province) Chilean Antarctic Territory, (Australia) Heard Island and McDonald Islands, (Norway) Peter I Island, (Norway) Queen Maud Land, (New Zealand) Ross Dependency.

== See also ==
- Visa policy of Marshall Islands
- Marshallese passport
