= Visa policy of Colombia =

Policy on permits required to enter Colombia

Visitors to Colombia must obtain an Online Visa unless they are citizens from one of the visa-exempt countries.

== Visa policy map ==
Visa policy of Colombia Colombia Visa not required - may enter with an ID card (90 days) Visa not required (90 days) Online Visa

== Visa exemption ==
=== Ordinary passports ===
Citizens of the following countries and territories may enter Colombia without a visa for stays up to the duration listed below. The stay may be extended for up to 180 days within a calendar year.

90 days

- All European Union member states

- Albania
- Andorra
- Antigua and Barbuda
- Argentina^{ID}
- Australia
- Azerbaijan
- Bahamas
- Barbados
- Belarus
- Belize
- Bhutan
- Bolivia^{ID}
- Bosnia and Herzegovina
- Brunei
- Brazil^{ID}
- Canada^{1}
- Chile^{ID}
- Costa Rica
- Dominica
- Dominican Republic
- Ecuador^{ID}
- El Salvador
- Fiji
- Georgia
- Grenada
- Guatemala
- Guyana
- Honduras
- Hong Kong
- Iceland
- Indonesia
- Jamaica
- Japan
- Kazakhstan
- Liechtenstein
- Marshall Islands
- Mexico
- Moldova
- Monaco
- Mongolia
- Montenegro
- Morocco
- Micronesia
- New Zealand
- North Macedonia
- Norway
- Palau
- Panama
- Papua New Guinea
- Paraguay^{ID}
- Peru^{ID}
- Philippines
- Qatar
- Russia
- Saint Kitts and Nevis
- Saint Lucia
- Saint Vincent and the Grenadines
- Samoa
- San Marino
- Serbia
- Singapore
- Solomon Islands
- South Korea
- Suriname
- Switzerland
- Trinidad and Tobago
- Turkey
- Ukraine
- United Arab Emirates
- United Kingdom
- United States
- Uruguay^{ID}
- Vatican City
- Venezuela^{ID}

90 days within any 180 days

- Israel

_{ID - May also enter with an ID card.}
_{1 - Canadian citizens must pay an entry fee of 256,000 Colombian Pesos (equivalent to CAD$85) upon arrival. This does not apply for passengers aged below 14 years or above 79 years.}

Date of visa changes

Dates of entry into force of visa-free agreements or unilateral visa waiver concessions

- 1 March 1958: Austria
- 23 November 1959: Finland
- 25 June 1961: United Kingdom
- 3 August 1962: Luxembourg
- 27 September 1962: Belgium
- 12 September 1963: Portugal
- 3 June 1965: Italy
- 10 October 1966: Israel (resumed)
- 8 November 1966: El Salvador
- 31 July 1968: Ireland
- 27 March 1969: Argentina
- 26 August 1969: Brazil
- 7 May 1971: Barbados
- 12 July 1972: Costa Rica
- 25 December 1981: South Korea
- 7 February 1986: Peru (resumed)
- 19 October 1990: Canada
- 4 December 1990: Mexico
- 7 December 1992: Paraguay
- 18 March 1993: Guatemala
- 12 September 2007: Honduras
- 20 April 2009: Russia
- 1 December 2012: Turkey
- 22 October 2013: Azerbaijan
- 2014: Kazakhstan
- 18 September 2017: Montenegro
- 14 February 2018: Bosnia and Herzegovina, Qatar, Serbia
- 3 August 2018: Albania, North Macedonia, Moldova
- 17 April 2020: Ukraine
- 5 April 2021: Morocco
- 19 December 2025: Belarus
- 26 January 2026: Mongolia

Cancelled:

- Peru: 23 January 1970 (was resumed in 1986)
- South Africa: 18 September 2017
- Malaysia: 28 December 2018
- Taiwan: 2 June 2023
- Israel: 5 June 2025 (was resumed in 2026)

Citizens of Nicaragua who are residents of North Caribbean Coast Autonomous Region and South Caribbean Coast Autonomous Region may enter Colombia without a visa.

- Visitors over the age of 6 arriving at San Andrés and Leticia must purchase tourist cards on arrival at a cost of 105,000 pesos and 30,000 pesos respectively.

=== Non-ordinary passports ===
In addition to countries whose citizens are visa-exempt, holders of diplomatic and official passports of the following countries may enter Colombia without a visa for up to 30 days (unless otherwise noted):

- Cambodia
- China
- Cuba
- Egypt
- India^{1}
- Indonesia
- Iran
- Lebanon
- Morocco^{1}
- Myanmar^{1}
- Oman
- Philippines
- Singapore^{1}
- Thailand^{1}
- Vietnam^{1}

_{1 - 90 days}

=== Substitute visa ===
Holders of permanent resident card issued by member nations of the Pacific Alliance (Chile, Mexico and Peru); of any nationality, are granted visa-free access for tourism up to 180 days.

Holders of passports issued by the following countries or territories are granted visa-free access for a maximum of 90 days (unless otherwise noted) if they hold visas or residence permits issued by the United States or a Schengen Area country:

- Cambodia
- China
- India
- Myanmar
- Nicaragua
- Taiwan
- Thailand
- Vietnam

The visa exemption also applies to Green Card holders, but does not apply to holders of C1 visas issued by the U.S. Holders of U.S. or Schengen visas must ensure their visa is valid for at least 180 days from their arrival date.

== Online Visa ==
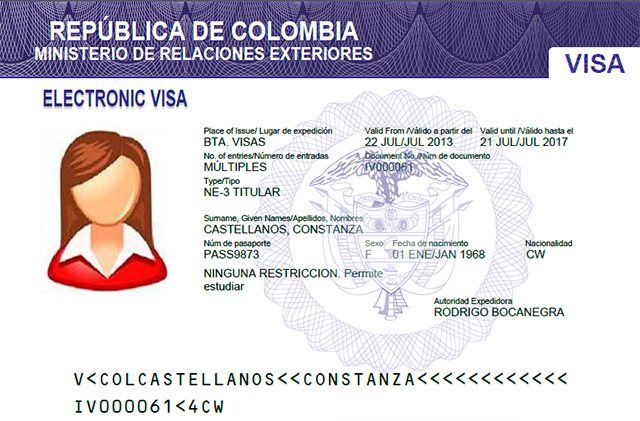
Sample of Colombian online visa

Citizens of other countries who require a visa may apply online.

== Transit without a visa ==
Most passengers can transit without a visa for a maximum of 24 hours, provided that their connecting flight must be booked on the same ticket. However, this does not apply to citizens of the following countries who must obtain a transit visa:

- Afghanistan
- Angola
- Bangladesh
- Burkina Faso
- Cameroon
- Côte d'Ivoire
- Egypt
- Eritrea
- Ethiopia
- Gambia
- Ghana
- Haiti
- India
- Iran
- Kenya
- Lebanon
- Mali
- Nepal
- Nigeria
- Pakistan
- Sierra Leone
- Somalia
- Sri Lanka
- Sudan
- Syria
- Tajikistan
- Uzbekistan

== Visitor statistics ==
Most visitors arriving to Colombia were from the following countries of nationality:

Country	2024*	2017	2016	2015	2014
United States	2,199,734	529,013	498,960	428,927	376,566
Venezuela	966,174	767,347	352,392	344,543	272,807
Mexico	676,437	171,841	158,975	144,618	110,172
Ecuador	633,130	168,998	167,121	149,593	126,743
Peru	384,571	140,905	140,055	132,514	122,342
Costa Rica	344,278	-	-	-	-
Chile	339,299	138,647	127,271	109,994	102,696
Panama	327,472	110,629	103,014	66,580	46,171
Spain	320,453	112,637	104,623	100,087	95,325
Brazil	301,117	209,138	181,852	136,917	124,718
Dominican Republic	245,476	-	-	-	-
Argentina	210,931	185,891	135,151	123,621	118,368
Canada	182,344	-	-	-	-
France	169,936	-	-	-	-
Netherlands	157,330	-	-	-	-
Germany	135,166	-	-	-	-
Guatemala	113,461	-	-	-	-
Italy	110,680	-	-	-	-
United Kingdom	108,901	-	-	-	-
Total	8,716,290	3,233,162	2,593,057	2,288,342	1,967,814
*Up to november 2024 according to Migración Colombia.

== See also ==
- Visa requirements for Colombian citizens
