= Visa policy of the Marshall Islands =

Policy on permits required to enter the Marshall Islands

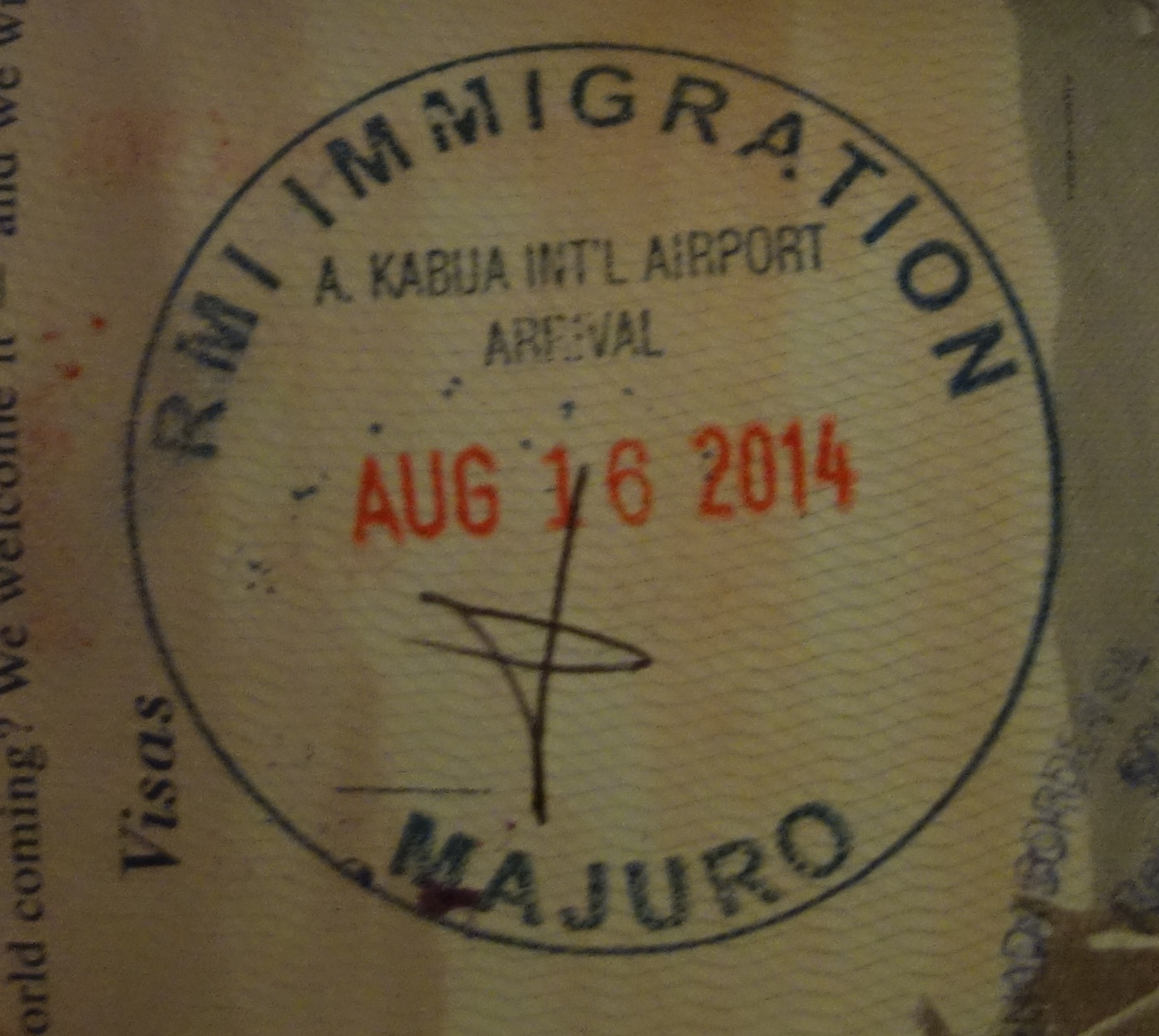
Entry stamp

Visitors to the Marshall Islands must obtain a visa unless they are citizens from one of the visa-exempt countries or citizens who may obtain a visa on arrival.

All visitors must have a passport valid for at least 6 months.

== Visa policy map ==
Visa policy of the Marshall Islands The Marshall Islands Visa not required (unlimited period) Visa not required (90 days) Free visa on arrival Visa required

== Visa exemption ==
=== Ordinary passports ===
Citizens of the following countries and territories may enter the Marshall Islands without a visa for the following period:

Unlimited period

- Micronesia
- Palau
- United States

90 days

- Taiwan

90 days within any 180 days

- All European Union member states
- United Kingdom

=== Non-ordinary passports ===
In addition, holders of diplomatic or official passports of India and Japan may enter the Marshall Islands without a visa.

=== Future changes ===
The Marshall Islands has signed visa exemption agreements with the following countries, but they have not yet been ratified:

Country	Passports	Agreement signed on
Ukraine	All	28 November 2019
Saint Kitts and Nevis	All	29 October 2019

== Visa on arrival ==
=== Free visa on arrival ===
Citizens of the following countries and territories may obtain a free visa on arrival for 90 days:

- Andorra
- Algeria
- Argentina
- Australia
- Azerbaijan
- Barbados
- Belize
- Bosnia and Herzegovina
- Brazil
- Brunei
- Cambodia
- Canada
- Cape Verde
- Chile
- Colombia
- Cook Islands
- Costa Rica
- Cuba
- Dominican Republic
- Ecuador
- Egypt
- El Salvador
- Eswatini
- Fiji
- French Polynesia
- Georgia
- Guatemala
- Honduras
- Iceland
- India
- Indonesia
- Israel
- Japan
- Kazakhstan
- Kiribati
- Kosovo
- Kuwait
- Kyrgyzstan
- Lebanon
- Liechtenstein
- Malaysia
- Maldives
- Mauritius
- Mexico
- Monaco
- Mongolia
- Morocco
- Myanmar
- Nauru
- New Caledonia
- New Zealand
- Nicaragua
- North Macedonia
- Papua New Guinea
- Paraguay
- Peru
- Philippines
- Russia
- Saint Kitts and Nevis
- Saint Lucia
- Saint Vincent and the Grenadines
- Samoa
- Seychelles
- Singapore
- Solomon Islands
- South Africa
- South Korea
- Sovereign Military Order of Malta
- Switzerland
- Tajikistan
- Thailand
- Timor-Leste
- Tonga
- Turkey
- Turkmenistan
- Tuvalu
- Ukraine
- United Arab Emirates
- Uruguay
- Vanuatu
- Vatican City
- Vietnam

Citizens of these countries are not exempted from providing Immigration with required documents to support their visa which include a recent police record and health clearance (proof of being free from HIV/AIDS and TB), they only provide these documents on arrival.

According to Timatic, visitors wishing to travel to Kwajalein are required to hold an Entry Authorization issued by the United States Military, which can be obtained on arrival. However, visitors will need to travel to Ebeye at their own expense if the Entry Authorization is not ready for collection.

== See also ==
- Visa requirements for Marshall Islands citizens
