= Marshallese nationality law =

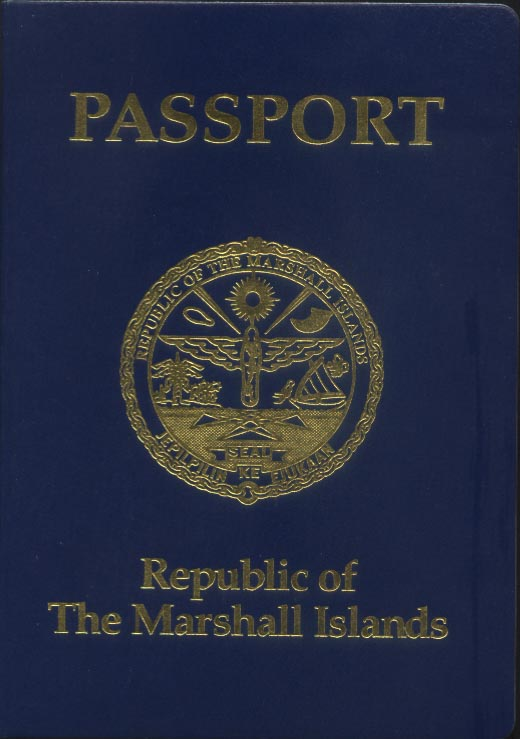
Marshallese Passport cover

Marshallese nationality law is regulated by the Marshallese Constitution of 1979, as amended; the 1984 Citizenship Act of the Marshall Islands, and its revisions; and international agreements entered into by the Marshallese government. These laws determine who is, or is eligible to be, a national of the Marshall Islands. The legal means to acquire nationality, formal membership in a nation, differ from the domestic relationship of rights and obligations between a national and the nation, known as citizenship. Marshallese nationality is typically obtained either on the principle of jus soli, i.e. by birth in the Marshall Islands or under the rules of jus sanguinis, i.e. by birth abroad to parents with Marshallese nationality. It can be granted to persons with an affiliation to the country, or to a permanent resident who has lived in the country for a given period of time through naturalization.

== Acquiring Marshallese nationality ==
Nationality in the Marshall Islands is acquired at birth, or later in life by registration or naturalization.

=== By birth ===
Birthright nationality applies to:

- Persons born in the Marshall Islands to at least one parent who is Marshallese;
- Persons born in the territory who have no entitlement to other nationality and would otherwise be stateless; or
- Persons born abroad to at least one parent who is a national of the Marshall Islands.

=== By registration ===
Nationality by registration includes those who have familial or historic relationship affiliations with the Marshall Islands. Persons who acquire nationality by registration include:

- Persons who under customary law or traditional practices are entitled to land rights in the territory;
- Persons who have lawfully resided in the territory for three years and have a child who is a Marshallese national;
- Minor children who were adopted by a Marshallese national, who have resided in the territory for a minimum of five years; or
- Persons who descend from a person with Marshallese heritage, at the discretion of the High Court of the Marshall Islands.

=== By naturalization ===
Regular naturalization in the Marshall Islands is acquired by submitting an application to the Cabinet member or Minister with the responsibility for the administration of immigration. Applicants must provide evidence that they are of good character, have familiarity with the language and customs of the Marshall Islands, have passed a civics examination, are self-supporting, and have resided within the territory for ten years. If the application is approved, the applicant must renounce other nationality and take a Loyalty Oath. A special naturalization process for persons who have performed distinguished service to the public or nation is permitted.

== Loss of nationality ==
Marshallese nationals may renounce their nationality provided they have legal majority and capacity and have obtained other nationality. In times of war, renunciation may not be allowed because of national security concerns. Denaturalization may occur if a person obtained nationality through fraud, false representation, or concealment; if they have committed acts of treason or disloyalty to the nation; or if they have obtained dual nationality outside of the permitted exceptions.

== Dual nationality ==
The constitution does not expressly prohibit dual citizenship, except if when citizenship is gained by registration, then "the Nitijela may by Act provide for the disqualification of any class of persons who would otherwise be entitled to be registered as citizens pursuant to this Section [citizenship by registration], but who have not already been so registered". This exception does not apply to people who are citizens by birthright, such as a person born in a foreign nation from at least one parent who is a Marshallese citizen.

== History ==
=== Spanish period (1568–1885) ===
In 1526, Spanish explorer Toribio Alonso de Salazar, who commanded the ship Santa Maria de la Victoria of the Loaísa Expedition, sighted an island in the Marshalls at 14°2" N that he named San Bartolomé, probably Taongi. He was unable to land on the island because of the currents. (Note: Though some accounts give Portuguese navigator Ferdinand Magellan as the first European to spot the islands, computer analysis of Magellan's route and evaluation by historians such as Andrew Sharp, confirm that during his Pacific voyage, Magellan did not encounter the Marshall Islands.) The following year Álvaro de Saavedra sailed through the Pacific Islands and sighted the Taka and Utirik Atolls. He made landfall in the Marshalls in 1528, on the Ailinginae and Rongelap Atolls and in 1529 sighted Ujelang Atoll before landing on Enewetak Atoll later that year.

Social hierarchy in the Marshall Islands was based on matrilineal clans (Bwij), and consisted of three classes — chiefs, elites and common laborers. Though status was inherited through women, men traditionally held chieftainships. The high chief was an autocratic ruler with the inherited responsibility for administrating society. He was assisted by elites who led battle and sailing expeditions, distributed land and food, and provided leadership. Laborers worked the land and sea to pay tribute to the chief and elites. A century of neglect followed before Spain formally annexed the Marshall Islands in 1686. Despite the annexation, Spanish activity in the region focused on exploiting the resources of and bringing Christianity to the Mariana and Philippine Islands. Merchant vessels on the way to trade with China passed through the area during Spanish rule, and in 1788, two sailors of the British East India Company, named the Gilbert and Marshall Islands after themselves.

In the 1850s, the American Board of Commissioners for Foreign Missions sent missionaries to work in the Pacific. They established the first mission in the Marshalls on Ebon Atoll in 1857. The founding of churches led to European settlers establishing themselves in the islands. The first of these were traders and by the 1870s, numerous firms operated by Americans, British, Germans, and New Zealanders were based in the territory. In 1878, the German navy negotiated a treaty with the local chief, which offered privileged trading in the Ralik Chain. In the early 1880s, Spain tried to revive its claim over the area, and assigned the territory to the Captaincy General of the Philippines. Under the terms of the Spanish Constitution of 1876, which was extended to the colonies, anyone born in Spanish territory was considered to be Spanish, but did not necessarily have the same rights as those persons born in Spain. In 1885, Germany was allowed by Spain to annex the Marshall Islands and in exchange for abandoning claims to the Caroline Islands were granted trade concessions and naval stations there.

=== German colony (1885–1920) ===
German policy was to avoid financial expenditure on complex colonial administration. In the Marshall Islands, they established a charter to govern various districts and then handed over authority to the trading firm Jaluit Gesellschaft to administrate and finance the protectorate. Under the terms of the Colonial Act of 1888, German colonies were not part of the federal union, but they were also not considered foreign. Thus, laws that were extended to the colonies sometimes treated residents as nationals and other times as foreigners. Native subjects in the colonies were not considered to be German, but were allowed to naturalize. Naturalization required ten years residence in the territory and proof of self-employment. It was automatically bestowed upon all members of a family, meaning children and wives derived the nationality of the husband.

In 1906, the Marshall Islands were placed under the supervision of the Governor of Rabaul, ending the financial responsibility of the Jaluit Gesellschaft for the territory. The Nationality Law of 1913 changed the basis for acquiring German nationality from domicile to patrilineality, but did not alter derivative nationality. With the outbreak of World War I, Japan joined the Allies and began an offensive to capture the German possessions in the Pacific. In 1914, Japanese troops captured the Marshall Islands and established a naval administration to take charge of civil affairs. At the end of the war, under terms of the Treaty of Versailles, Japan was granted the South Seas Mandate in 1919, which included the Caroline, Mariana, Marshall, and Palau islands. Terms of the mandate specified that islanders were not to be militarized and that social and economic development in the territory was to be of benefit to the local inhabitants.

=== Japanese colony (1920–1947) ===
Between 1921 and 1922, administration for the Japanese Pacific colonies passed from the navy to civil authorities of the South Seas Bureau (Japanese: Nan'yō Chō). The native inhabitants of the islands were not equal to Japanese imperial subjects and were accorded different status. They were considered aliens, though if they met requirements of the 1899 Nationality Law, islanders could naturalize. It was doubtful that any Marshallese would qualify under the law which was designed to prevent foreigners from becoming Japanese nationals. Japanese nationality was based upon family identity and descent. Lacking specific lineage from a Japanese parent or extraordinary service to Japan, the interior minister denied almost every request for naturalization for fifty years after the 1899 law was passed. Under the system of family identity, when a woman married she was removed from her registered family (Japanese: koseki) and added to the registry of her husband's family. Provisions required that women who married foreigners lost their nationality and foreign women who married Japanese men gained nationality. In the case that a registered family had no male heirs, a foreign husband could be adopted (Japanese: mukoyōshi), deriving the nationality of his wife to carry on the family line.

Under Japan's colonial governance systems, law could be promulgated in Japan or in the colony. There was no uniform system of determining which law was applicable in different jurisdictions, but in general Orders of the Privy Council (Japanese: chokurei) enacted by the National Diet were not enforced by the South Seas Bureau. On the other hand, organic laws (Japanese: kansei) were written specifically to define the relationship between all institutions and the Colonial Office, as well as the local and national governments. The administrative ability of the colonial governor in the South Seas Bureau was highly regulated by the imperial government. Despite the League of Nations' mandate for Japan to treat the colonies as integral parts of the nation, Japan chose not to extend the constitution to Marshall Islanders or their other Pacific colonies. By 1935, the Japanese population in the Pacific exceeded the indigenous population of the islands, and much of the land had been bought from the native owners with the approval of the Japanese government.

By the mid-1930s the Japanese government abandoned the pretense of developing the Pacific islands for the benefit of the inhabitants and began building a series of fortifications in the region, planning for expansion in Southeast Asia. The substantial number of garrisons erected prolonged the conflicts during World War II (1939–1945), as the allied forces opted for a strategy of retaking island possessions rather than a direct strike on Japan. The Gilbert and Marshall Islands campaign began in 1943 and by early 1944, the Marshall Islands had been captured by US forces. At the end of the war, the United States proposed to retain control over the former Japanese-mandated islands for security purposes. In 1947, a trust agreement was drawn with the United Nations and the United States to establish the Trust Territory of the Pacific Islands.

=== United States trust territory (1947–1979) ===
Upon taking control of the region, the United States Navy decreed the removal of Japanese immigrants. The Trust Territory was managed by the navy until 1951, at which time administration was passed to the United States Department of the Interior. The following year, the Code of the Trust Territory was introduced. It defined nationals as persons born in the territory prior to 22 December 1952 who had not acquired other nationality, or those born after that date in the territory. It also confirmed that children born abroad to parents who were nationals of the Trust Territory derived their parents' nationality until the age of twenty-one. Foreigners over the age of eighteen were allowed to naturalize in the Trust Territories. Trust Territories nationals were not considered to be US nationals but were allowed to naturalize as would any other foreigner in the United States.

From 1969, the United States and representatives of the Trust Territory began negotiations to develop systems to terminate the trusteeship and provide pathways to independence. Because of the diversity of the districts of the territory, it was divided into four areas — Federated States of Micronesia, the Marshall Islands, the Northern Mariana Islands, and Palau — as it was deemed that a single set of documents would not adequately serve the political needs for the region. After developing a system of governance which combined Marshallese customary and traditional law, a British-style parliamentary cabinet system, and a US-based constitution, the Marshall Islands declared their independence in 1979.

=== Post-Independence (1979–present) ===
Under the Marshallese Constitution, ratified in 1979, persons born before 21 December 1978 and who were nationals of the Trust Territory on that date automatically became nationals of the Republic of the Marshall Islands if they or their parents had land rights in the territory. Thereafter, those born in the territory to parents who were Marshallese became nationals. The Marshallese and United States governments began negotiations to establish a Free Association, to resolve US concerns about strategic security and Marshallese concerns for economic development. In 1982 the parties signed a Compact of Free Association, which established the relationship between the two nations, specifying the United States' responsibility to provide for the defense of the Marshall Islands and use of the territory for military purposes, as well as the islands' sovereignty over their territory. A plebiscite was held in 1983, wherein Marshallese inhabitants accepted the compact, which would go into force, terminating the trustee relationship, in 1986.

In 1984, the Marshall Islands propagated a Citizenship Act which granted women the same rights as men for acquiring, changing, or retaining their nationality. One of the provisions to grant equality was that women who were automatically bestowed their husband's nationality upon marriage would not lose their Marshallese status even if they became dual nationals. In general, marriage does not impact Marshallese nationality and there are no special provisions for a spouse to derive nationality from their spouse in the Marshall Islands. Under the terms of the original Compact of Free Association, Marshallese nations had no restrictions of requirements for visa to enter and reside in the United States. In 2003, visa restrictions were implemented only for undocumented Marshallese children who were adopted by US-national parents and for persons who purchased Marshallese passports.
