= Colombian passport =

Passport issued to nationals of Colombia

Colombian passport; Pasaporte colombiano
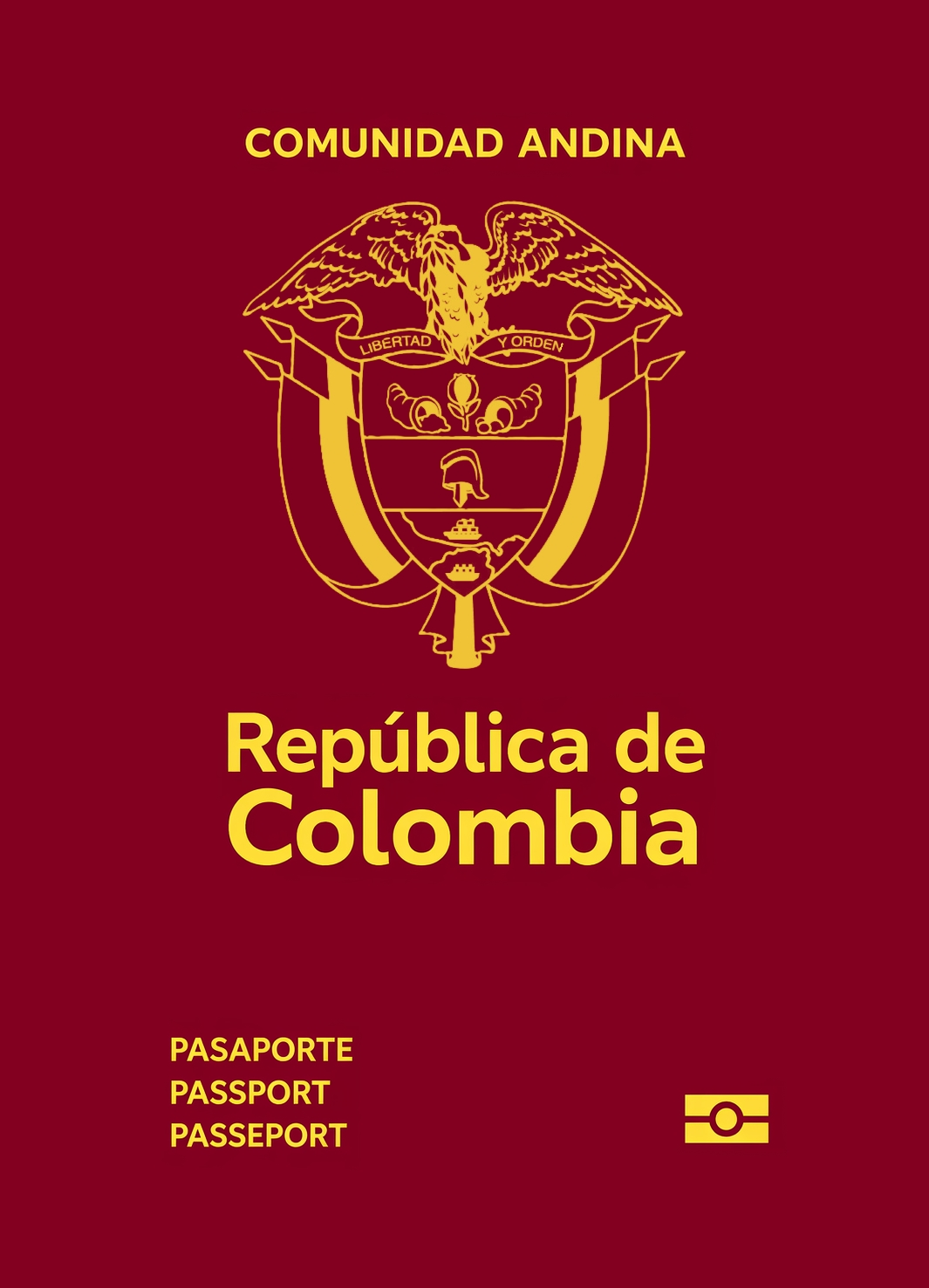
- The front cover of an ordinary Colombian passport since 2026.

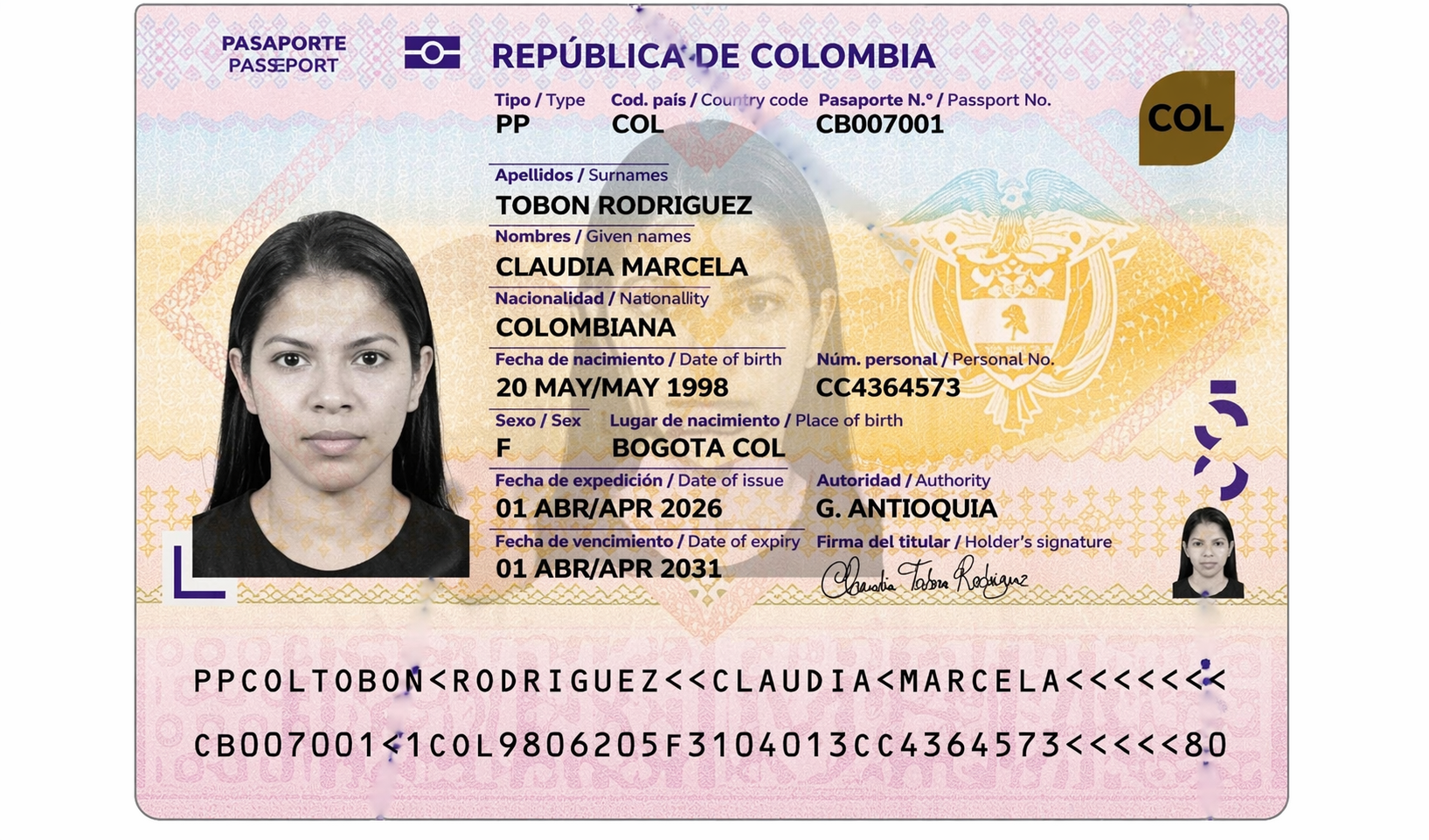
- The information page of an ordinary Colombian passport since 2026.
- Type: Passport
- Issued by: Colombia
- First issued: Current version: April 2026, 01; 5 months ago
- Purpose: International travel
- Eligibility: Colombian nationality
- Expiration: 10 years after issuance or upon changing name and/or sex marker
- Cost: Ordinary passport: Col$116,600 (Bogotá); Col$195,600 + departmental taxes (rest of Colombia); €63.00 (European Union and Cuba); US$86.00 (rest of the world); Executive passport: Col$256.400 (Bogotá); Col$335.400 + departmental taxes (rest of Colombia); €126.00 (European Union and Cuba); US$175.00 (rest of the world); Emergency passport: Col$201.700 (Bogotá); Col$201.700 + departmental taxes (rest of Colombia); €90.00 (European Union and Cuba); US$129.00 (rest of the world)

The Colombian passport (Spanish: pasaporte colombiano) is a travel document issued by Colombia to its nationals for the purpose of international travel. Since September 2015, Colombia has issued biometric passports.

Colombian citizens do not need a passport when traveling to Argentina, Bolivia, Brazil, Chile, Ecuador, Paraguay, Peru, Uruguay, and Venezuela. For these countries, they may use just their domestic identification cards called Cédula de Ciudadanía.

Several drivers resulted in the issuing of the document:

- The International Civil Aviation Organization (ICAO) issued Resolution No. A36-15 in which it urged its 190 member countries to issue machine-readable passports from 2010. The intent of this resolution was to ensure the security and integrity of travel documents worldwide.
- Increased safety: The new book has special design features and print materials that correspond to three levels of security.
- Allowing quick migration processes: the machine-readable zone facilitates the process of recognition and registration of the passenger when entering or leaving a country, because a machine automatically interprets the information encoded in their passport, which reduces approximately 50% on-call time by immigration agents.

== Application ==
The Colombian passport can be issued in any of the Passport Offices of the Colombian Ministry of Foreign Affairs, in 27 governorates of the country, and in the Colombian consulates abroad. The presentation of the citizenship card (yellow with holograms) and the attendance of the applicant are mandatory because the photograph, signature and fingerprints are taken at the time of application. Passports are currently delivered within 24 hours in Bogotá. 48 working hours in the governorates and 48 hours to 5 working days in embassies and consulates, depending on the distance.

== Current passport design ==
As of 1 September 2015, the Colombian passport includes biometric technology. It uses the same machine-readable system, but with an integrated chip where information such as fingerprints, photos and data of the document holder is stored. On 16 June 2010, the Colombian Foreign Ministry officially announced that the new passport design had been made official by the provisions of the International Civil Aviation Organisation, which required the country to conform to the regulations currently in force in the European Union, or at least to the standard used by 173 countries. From 15 July 2010, this document could be applied for in Bogotá and from 5 August 2010 at passport offices in the governorates of the rest of the country and consulates abroad. The biometric photograph of the passport must identify the person and for this reason, has requirements: it must be 4 x 5 cm in size, the background must be clear and uniform, the face visible, taken recently.

This document can be machine-readable, as the data is laser-engraved. In addition, the barcode facilitates migration processes because the data of each citizen is uploaded directly to the migration servers at the airports. The document contains embossed and fluorescent holograms, which makes it almost impossible to forge and has the highest security standards.

In September 2018, the Colombian passport was recognized as the safest passport in the world during the first eID Forum.

== Visa requirements map ==
Visa requirements for Colombian citizens Colombia Freedom of Movement and ID card travel Partial Freedom of Movement and ID card travel Visa not required Visa on arrival eVisa Visa available both on arrival or online Visa required

As of 2025, Colombian citizens had visa-free or visa on arrival access to 132 countries and territories, ranking the Colombian passport 39th in the world according to the Henley Passport Index.

== See also ==
- Colombian identity card
- Colombian nationality law
- Visa requirements for Colombian citizens

== External sources ==
- Colombia.com, Guia para los colombianos en el exterior
- pasaportes.gov.co, current Colombian Passport
