= Colombian nationality law =

Colombian Citizenship Act

Parliament of Colombia
- Long title: An Act relating to Colombian citizenship
- Territorial extent: Colombia
- Enacted by: Government of Colombia

Related legislation
- Constitution of Colombia
- Status: Current legislation

Colombian nationality is typically obtained by birth in Colombia when one of the parents is either a Colombian national or a Colombian legal resident, by birth abroad when at least one parent is a Colombian national, or by naturalization, as defined by Article 96 of the Constitution of Colombia and the Law 43-1993 as modified by Legislative Act 1 of 2002. Colombian law differentiates between nationality and citizenship. Nationality is the attribute of the person in international law that describes their relationship to the State, whereas citizenship is given to those nationals (i.e. those that hold Colombian nationality) that have certain rights and responsibilities to the State. Article 98 of the Colombian constitution establishes that Colombian citizens are those nationals that are 18 years of age or older. Colombian citizens are entitled to vote in elections and exercise the public actions provided in the constitution.

== Nationality by birth ==
Colombia does not grant automatic birthright citizenship. To obtain Colombian nationality at birth, a person must have at least one parent who is a national or legal resident of Colombia.

A child born outside Colombia who has at least one Colombian parent can be registered as a Colombian national by birth, either upon returning to Colombia (for residents) or at a consulate abroad (for non-residents).

== Nationality by naturalization ==
A person who has lived in Colombia as a legal permanent resident (i.e. on a Resident (R) visa) for five years may apply for naturalization with the Ministry for Foreign Affairs. There are exceptions to the usual residence requirements in some cases, including:

- one year of residence for nationals by birth of a Latin American or a Caribbean country;
- two years' residence for nationals by birth of Spain;
- two years' residence for a person married to a Colombian national or parent of child holding, or eligible for, Colombian nationality;
- five years' residence for foreigners who are not Latin American, Caribbean or Spanish nationals.

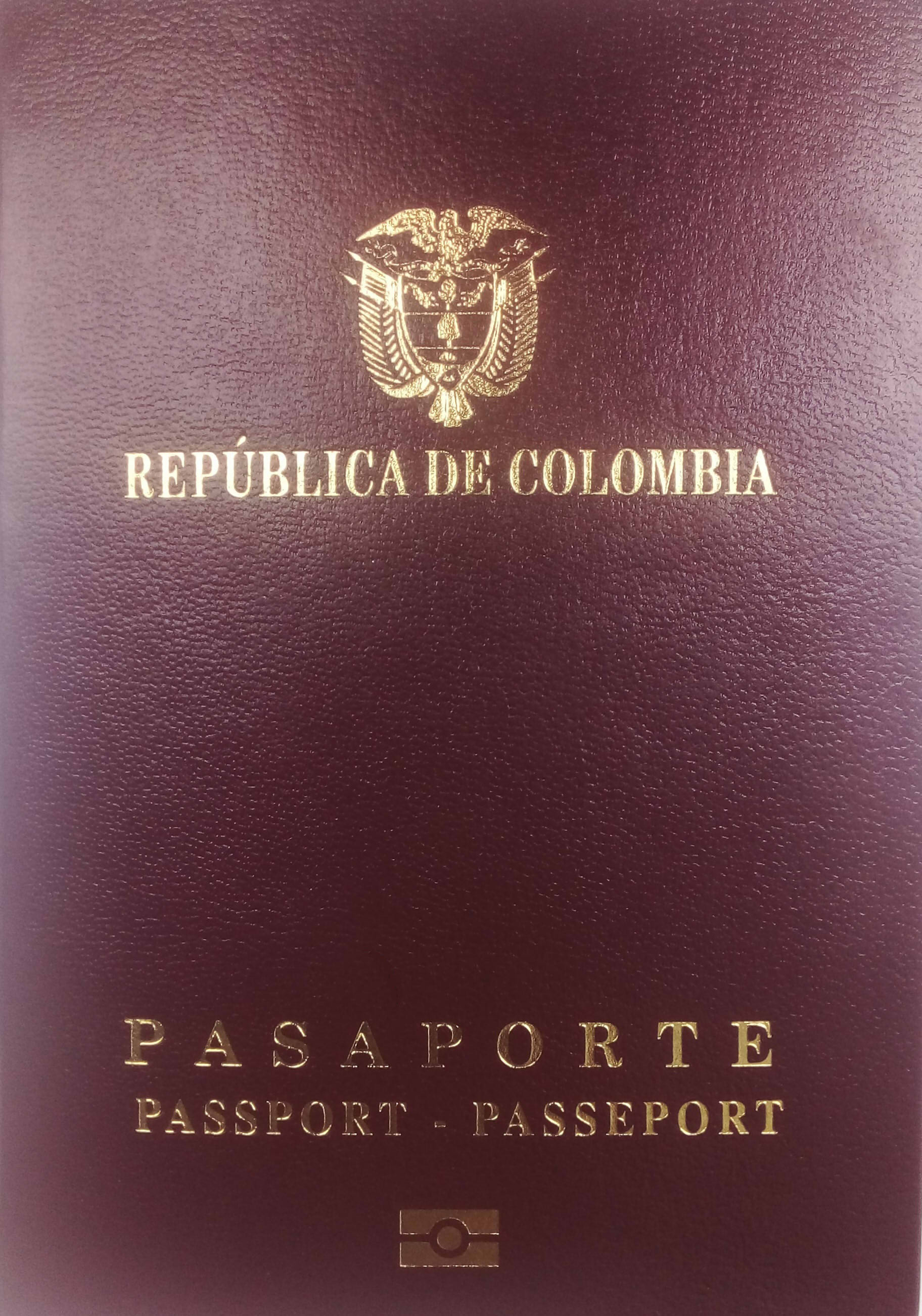
Colombian nationality confers the right to acquire a Colombian passport.

=== Tests ===
Applicants for naturalization must also pass a test on Colombia's history, geography and constitution. A Spanish-language aptitude test is also required for people who are not native Spanish-speakers.

Those who have a bachelor's degree from a Colombian university or are over 65 years old are exempt from the tests.

== Multiple nationality ==
Colombian nationality law acknowledges that a Colombian by birth or by naturalization can also have other nationalities.

Colombians who acquired Colombian nationality by birth cannot be deprived of it under any circumstances, so acquiring another nationality does not in itself result in the loss of Colombian nationality. A person who renounced Colombian nationality may recover it later.

Nevertheless, certain government positions are barred for those with dual nationality. For example, career diplomats may not hold dual nationality as per Colombian law; an individual with dual nationality may be appointed to a diplomatic position, but cannot acquire career rights.

== Renunciation of nationality ==
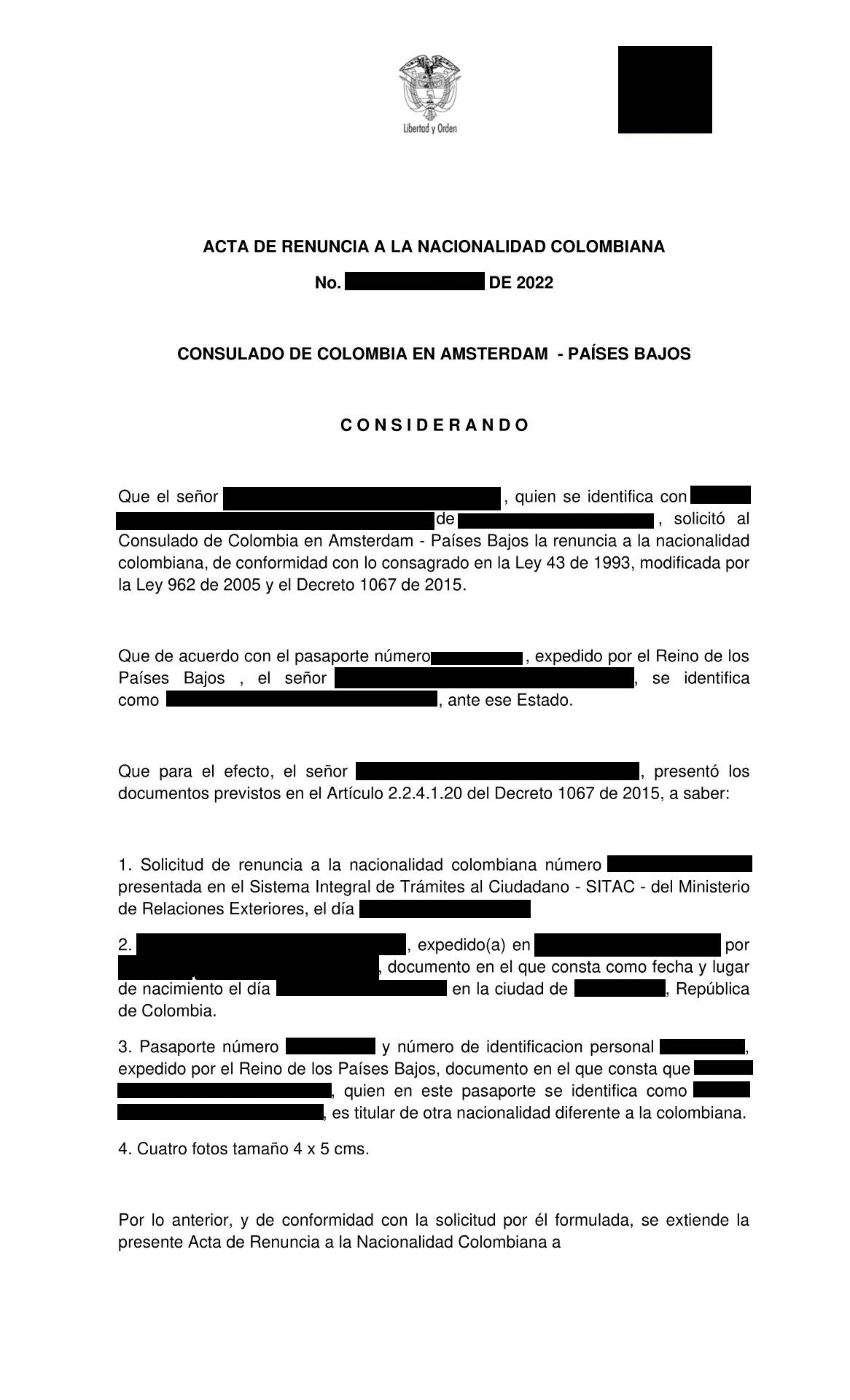
Certificate of renunciation of Colombian nationality, issued by the Colombian consulate in Amsterdam, the Netherlands in 2022

Colombian citizens can renounce their nationality. The process of renunciation requires the citizen to appear at a Colombian embassy or consulate if the petitioner lives outside of Colombia, or at the Ministry for Foreign Affairs if the petitioner resides in Colombia. To start the process of renouncing Colombian nationality, the petitioner must hold a nationality from a different country.

== History ==
The founding document of Gran Colombia, which included parts of modern-day Ecuador, Colombia, Panama, and Venezuela, was the Colombian Constitution of 1821. It defined as nationals free persons, born in the territory along with their descendants, residents of the country who were faithful to independence, and naturalized foreigners who had been born abroad. According to women's scholar, Charity Coker-Gonzalez, it did not specify the gender of birthright nationals "because it was inconceivable that such a distinction might be necessary". The Constitution of 1830, provided that either fathers or mothers could transmit nationality to offspring, but that to have nationality, a person had to reside in the territory. It also granted nationality to freedmen. At the time Gran Colombia was partitioned into the Republic of New Granada, Ecuador, and Venezuela in 1832, the new constitution granted birthright nationality to those born in the territory and descended of nationals of the country. Children born in New Grenada to foreigners or children born abroad to New Grenadian nationals, or former Gran Colombian nationals, were entitled to derived nationality if they were domiciled in the country. The 1832 Constitution also granted nationality to the children of slave women who were covered by the Freedom of wombs laws. By the time the 1843 Constitution was adopted the language was specific, identifying nationals as adult men who had sufficient resources. It also carried provisions that foreign women married to New Granadians were deemed to be naturalized upon marriage. (Note: Francisco Vetancourt Aristeguieta, a Venezuelan scholar of nationality in South America, stated that his belief was that because Number 3 of Article 5 in the 1843 Constitution of New Granada required foreign women to become New Granadians, it was likely that Grenadian women lost nationality by marriage with a foreigner. ["Probablemente, la reciprocidad era forzosa"]. Supreme Court cases indicate that the court heard at least two cases regarding whether nationality was lost through marriage.)

In 1851 the legislature passed a law fully abolishing slavery in the territory which became effective on 1 January 1852. To clarify that former slaves were no longer obligated to serve their former masters, a second piece of legislation was passed in April 1852. Between 1853 and 1886, states within New Granada, and later the Granadine Confederation (1858–1863) and United States of Colombia (1863–1886), had the authority to adopt their own constitutions and civil codes. Andrés Bello, a professor and legislator, had drafted the Civil Code of Chile in 1855 and at the request of Manuel Ancízar, a Colombian diplomat and politician, copies of the code were sent to Colombia. Beginning with the adoption of the Bello Code in the State of Santander in 1857, one by one the states of Colombia adopted versions of the Chilean Civil Code, modifying it to make adjustment for local custom. The 1863 Constitution granted nationality to persons born in Spanish America, as long as they resided in the confines of the nation. It made clear that nationality was lost if a Colombian established a domicile and acquired nationality in another country. The constitution did not specifically address women in any of its articles, but excluded them from the right to citizenship and any benefits or obligations derived from nationality. In 1873, the Bello Code became the basis of the national civil code of Colombia. Article 87 of the new Colombian Civil Code provided that wives were required to have the same domicile as their husbands.

The Colombian Constitution of 1886 enacted upon the country's reorganization into the Republic of Colombia reconstructed the country uniting it under the cultural influence of the Catholic faith and the Castilian language. It restricted nationality to three types of nationals. Naturals were those born in and residing in the country to either native-born or foreign parents. Nationals of origin and vicinity were legitimate children born abroad to Colombian parents who were residents of Colombia or those born in Latin America but requested to be Colombian nationals residing in a municipality of the territory. Naturalized citizens were foreigners who asked to adopt Colombian nationality. The 1886 Constitution carried the same provisions for loss of nationality as had its predecessor and remained in force, though it was amended several times, until the adoption of the Colombian Constitution of 1991.

The Naturalization Law (Ley 145) of 1888 provided that men married to Colombian women were given favorable terms for naturalization, reducing the four-year residency requirement to two years. It also clarified in Article 17 that wives and minor children (under age 21) derived the nationality of the husband. (Note: The Colombian Ministry of Foreign Affairs provided statement which was approved by Colombian Foreign Office in 1933 to the Inter-American Commission of Women, stating that legal interpretation in Colombia held that Article 17 applied only in the case that a foreign man was naturalized. Upon his naturalization, his spouse and minor children's nationality automatically changed to his.) Two rulings by the Ministry of Foreign Affairs, in the cases of Reyes Gnecco de Dugand (24 March 1888) and Emma Hulsman (1923), negated the requirement for married women to lose their nationality. Colombia passed exclusionary immigration laws beginning in 1922 which barred ethnic groups which were inconvenient for better racial development. In 1935, the country instituted a quota system for immigrants limiting who could come from various countries, and in 1936 exorbitant fees and documentation were required for Bulgarians, Chinese, Egyptians, Estonians, Greeks, Hindus, Latvians, Lebanese, Lithuanians, Moroccans, Palestinians, Poles, Romanians, Russians, Syrians, Turks and Yugoslavs, as well as any Roma person regardless of their nationality.

In 1933, Alfonso López and Raimundo Rivas, the Colombian delegates to the Pan-American Union's Montevideo conference, signed the Inter-American Convention on the Nationality of Women, which became effective in 1934, without legal reservations. Revisions to the Constitution in 1936 recognized some rights for women – access to education, limited administration of family assets, and some role in public duties – though it expressly stated only males over age 21 were citizens. It also eliminated the requirement that children had to be legitimate or legitimized to become nationals and extended the preferential naturalization processes of Spanish Americans to Brazilians. Article 5, addressed the situation when a Colombian woman lost nationality because upon marriage to a foreigner, her husband's country automatically nationalized her, providing that her marriage per international agreement could not cause a change in her nationality. Also in 1936, the Naturalization Law (Ley 22) was revised and Article 17 of the previous code, requiring unified family nationality, was repealed. In 1945, the Constitution was amended again. The new provisions included that citizenship was dependent on nationality and if lost, it could be regained by application. It also specified that all women at least 21 years old were citizens, though they could not vote nor hold elective office. The 1991 Constitution of Colombia allowed dual nationality.
