= Kathy Jetn̄il-Kijiner =

Poet from the Marshall Islands

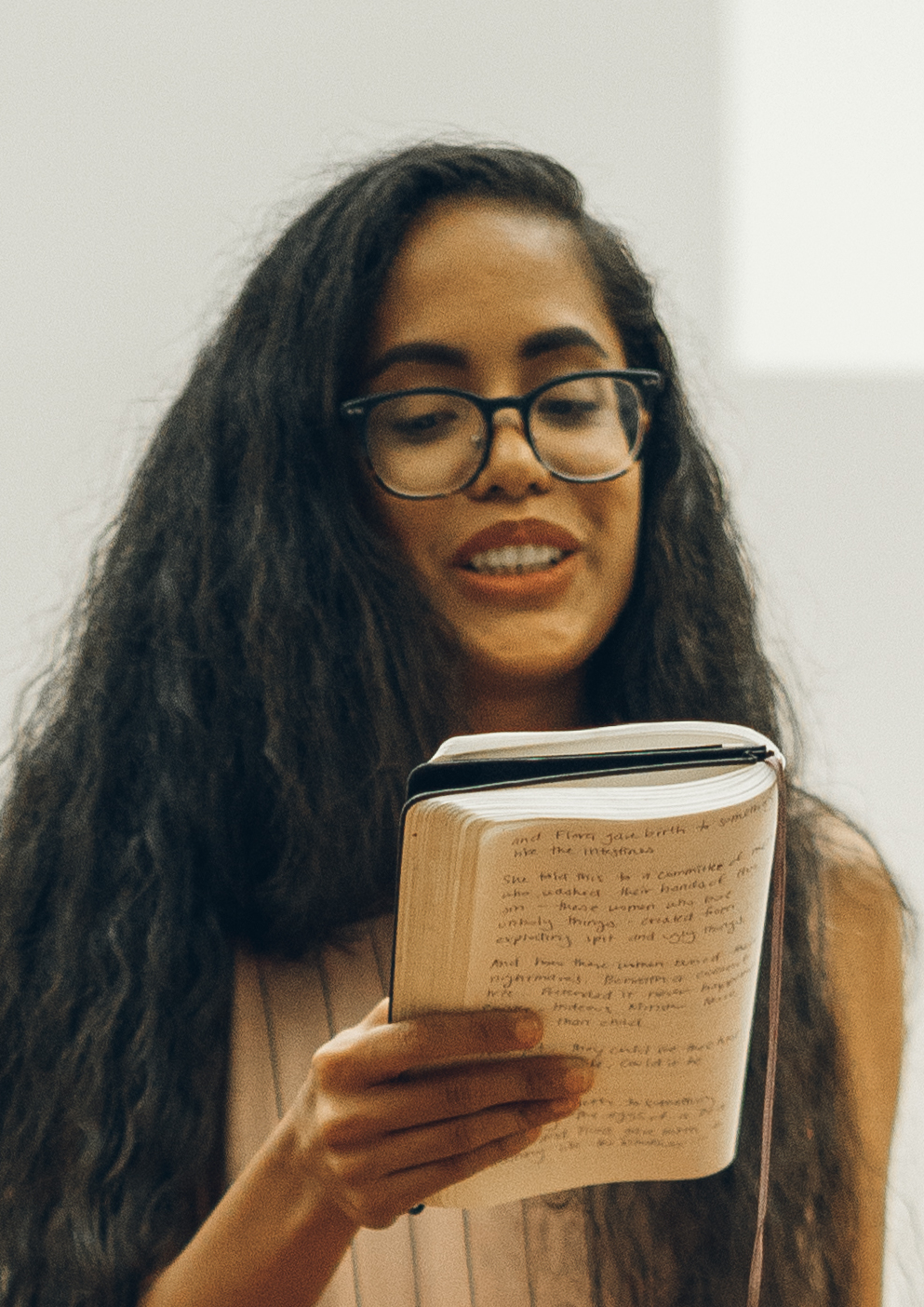
- Kathy Jetn̄il-Kijiner, in 2018
- Born: Marshall Islands
- Education: University of Hawaiʻi at Mānoa, Mills College
- Notable work: "Dear Matafele Peinem" (poem)
- Awards: Impact Hero of the Year (Earth Company)

Kathy Jetn̄il-Kijiner is a poet and climate change activist from the Marshall Islands.

== Early life ==
Jetn̄il-Kijiner was born in the Marshall Islands and raised in Hawaii. Her mother is Hilda Heine, President of the Marshall Islands. Jetn̄il-Kijiner received her B.A. from Mills College in California and her MA in Pacific Island Studies from the University of Hawaiʻi at Mānoa.

== Career ==
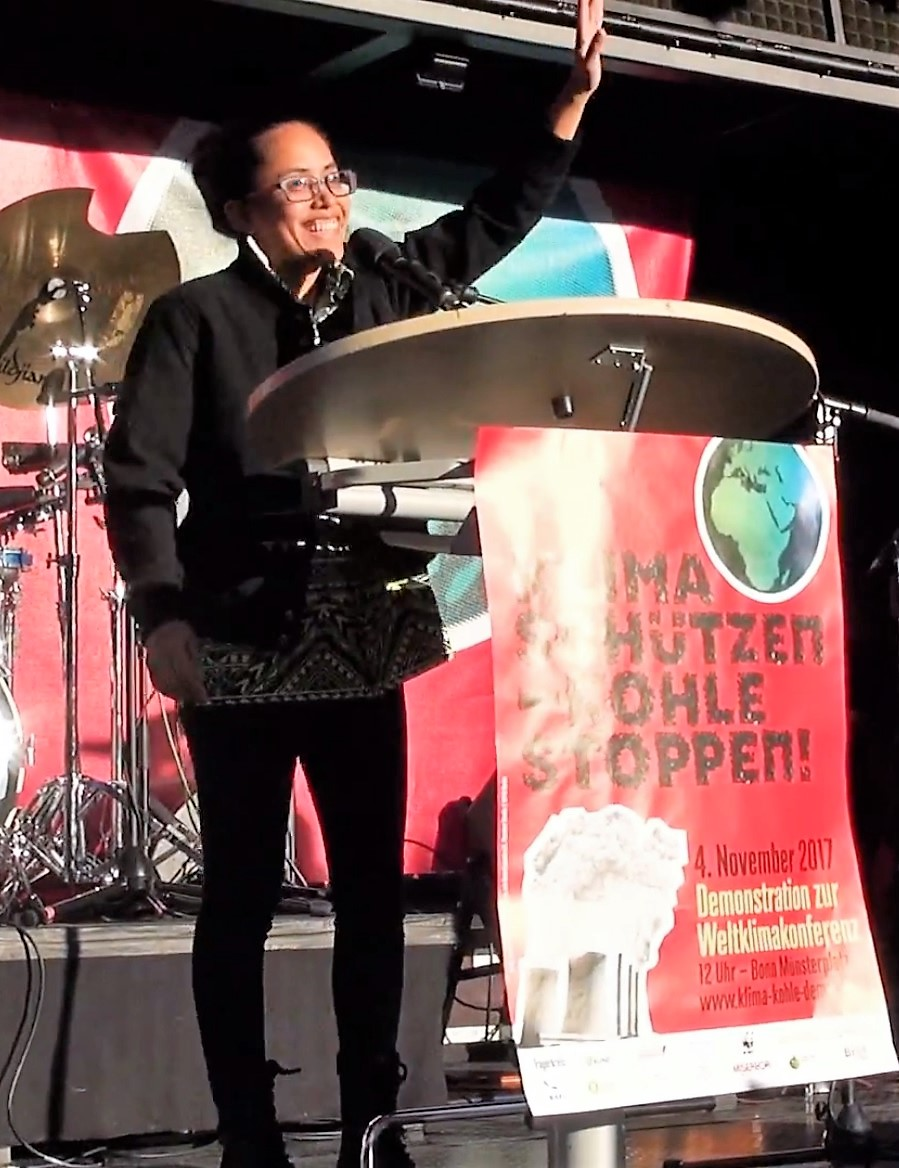
Kathy Jetnil-Kijiner at World Climate Conference COP23

Jetn̄il-Kijiner's poetry highlights issues around the environment and climate change. She also explores social injustice including colonialism, migration, and racism.

Her first collections of poetry, entitled Iep Jāltok: Poems from a Marshallese Daughter, was published in 2017 by the University of Arizona Press. It is considered the first published book of poetry written by someone from the Marshall Islands.

She is a cofounder of the environmental nonprofit organization Jo-Jikum (Jodrikdrik in Jipan ene eo e Kutok Maroro) which aims to support Marshallese youth in taking action on climate change and environmental issues that affect the Marshall Islands.

Jetn̄il-Kijiner taught at the College of the Marshall Islands as the Pacific Studies faculty instructor.

She is currently pursuing a Ph.D. in Gender, Media and Cultural Studies at the Australian National University.

Selected poetry by Jetn̄il-Kijiner was included in UPU, a curation of Pacific Island writers’ work which was first presented at the Silo Theatre as part of the Auckland Arts Festival in March 2020. UPU was remounted as part of the Kia Mau Festival in Wellington in June 2021.

== Accomplishments ==
In 2012, she represented the Marshall Islands at the Poetry Parnassus Festival in London. In 2014, Jetn̄il-Kijiner was chosen to address the United Nations Climate Summit. She performed the piece, 'Dear Matafele Peinem', at the opening ceremony in New York. In 2015 she was invited to speak at COP21 in Paris. Also in 2015, she was selected by Vogue magazine as one of 13 Climate Warriors and in 2017 named Impact Hero of the Year by Earth Company.

Her work was included in the Asia Pacific Triennial of Contemporary Art (APT9) in 2018 at Queensland Gallery of Modern Art where her work referenced the weaving process and gender roles in the form of an installation and performance. In 2019, Jetn̄il-Kijiner was selected as an Obama Asia Pacific Leader Fellow and MIT Director’s Media Lab Fellow.

Jetn̄il-Kijiner is featured in Naomi Hirahara's anthology We Are Here: 30 Inspiring Asian Americans and Pacific Islanders Who Have Shaped the United States that was published by the Smithsonian Institution and Running Press Kids in 2022.

== Notable works ==
=== Iep Jāltok: Poems from a Marshallese Daughter (2017) ===
In 2017, Jetn̄il-Kijiner made history by being the first Marshallese author to publish a book, a collection of poems entitled Iep Jaltok: Poems from a Marshallese Daughter. Her book engages with themes of the human, socioeconomic, and environmental crisis that the Marshall Islands encountered due to the United States military occupation. Her poems outline the daily lives of the Marshallese as they follow their customs and traditions while experiencing environmental problems as a result of nuclear testings, colonialism, and climate change.

=== "Rise: From One Island to Another" (2018) ===
In 2018, Jetn̄il-Kijiner collaborated with Aka Niviâna, a climate change activist poet from Greenland, to write a poem about their stories of climate change. The poem, "Rise: From One Island to Another," explains the destruction of two opposite homelands and the reality of melting icecaps and rising sea levels. In an interview with Grist Magazine, Jetn̄il-Kijiner said that "when she found herself face-to-face with a physical body that threatens to submerge her ancestral homeland, she felt reverence, not anger." The two indigenous women performed the poem on top of a glacier in Greenland. The video is six minutes long with footage of scenery from glaciers and beaches, paying homage to each women's homes.

== Bibliography ==
- Iep Jāltok: Poems from a Marshallese Daughter The University of Arizona Press, 2017. ISBN 9780816534029
- Kathy Jetn̄il-Kijiner (ed), Leora Kava (ed), Craig Santos Perez (ed), Indigenous Pacific Islander eco-literatures University of Hawaiʻi Press, Honolulu, 2022. ISBN 9780824891046
