= Effects of climate change on small island countries =

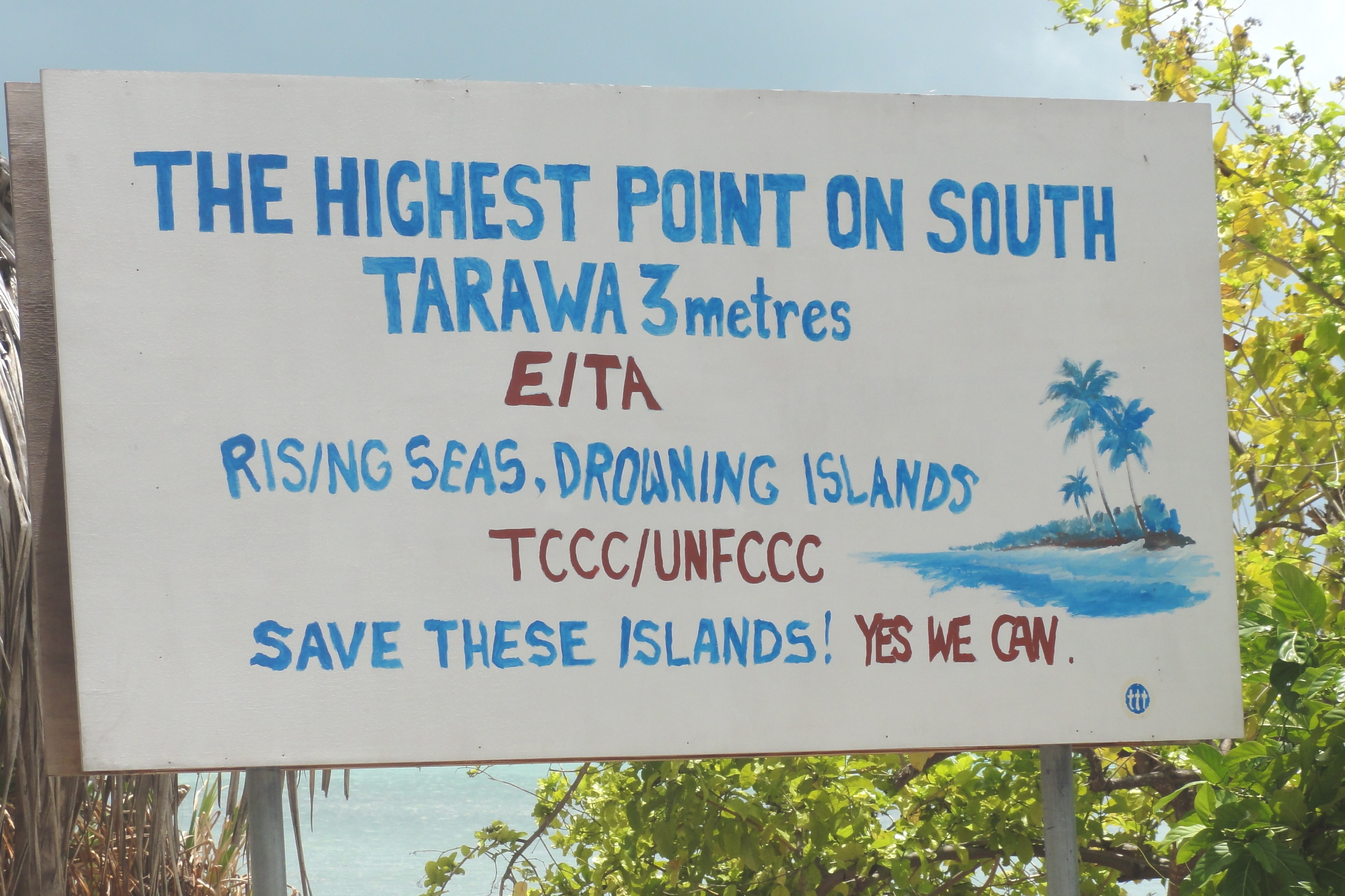
A sign on South Tarawa, Kiribati pointing out the threat of sea level rise to the island, with its highest point being only three metres above sea level.

The effects of climate change, including sea level rise, increasing heavy rain events, tropical cyclones and storm surges, threaten the existence of many island countries, their peoples and cultures. They also alter ecosystems and natural environments in those countries. Small island developing states (SIDS) are a heterogenous group of countries but many of them are particularly at risk due to climate change. Those countries have been quite vocal in calling attention to the challenges they face from climate change. In a 2025 cross-national survey of 14,710 people across 55 small-island states and territories found an 89 to nearly 100% acceptance of human-caused climate change.

However, when addressing smaller island communities, it is important to consider the empirical gap. Currently, there are issues with having adequate data that best supports these communities’ opinions, beliefs, and behavior on climate change. Geologically, it is difficult to survey these countries because of obstacles with service or low internet access. Addressing this empirical gap means that we perform essential research to better obtain perspective from these smaller countries, working together to find efficient solutions to slow climate change. For example, the Maldives and nations of the Caribbean and Pacific Islands are already experiencing considerable impacts of climate change. It is critical for them to implement climate change adaptation measures fast.

Some small and low population islands do not have the resources to protect their islands and natural resources. They experience climate hazards which impact on human health, livelihoods, and inhabitable space. This can lead to pressure to leave these islands but resources to do so are often lacking as well.

Efforts to combat these challenges are ongoing and multinational. Many of the small island developing countries have a high vulnerability to climate change, whilst having contributed very little to global greenhouse gas emissions. Therefore, some small island countries have made advocacy for global cooperation on climate change mitigation a key aspect of their foreign policy.

== Common features ==
Small island developing states (SIDS) are identified as a group of 38 United Nations (UN) Member States and 20 Non-UN Member/Associate Members that are located in three regions: the Caribbean; the Pacific; and the Atlantic, Indian Ocean, Mediterranean and South China Seas (AIMS) and are home to approximately 65 million people. These nations are far from homogeneous but they do share numerous features, including narrow resource bases, dominance of economic sectors that are reliant on the natural environment, limited industrial activity, physical remoteness, and limited economies of scale.

Due to close connections between human communities and coastal environments, SIDS are particularly exposed to hazards associated with the ocean and cryosphere, including sea level rise, extreme sea levels, tropical cyclones, marine heatwaves, and ocean acidification. A common feature of SIDS is a high ratio of coastline-to-land area, with large portions of populations, infrastructure, and assets being located along the coast.

Patterns of increasing hazards, high levels of exposure, and acute vulnerability interact to result in high risk of small island developing states (SIDS) to climate change.

Small island developing states (SIDS) have long been recognized as being particularly at risk to climate change. These nations are often described as being on the "frontlines of climate change", as "hot spots of climate change", or as being "canaries in the coalmine". The Intergovernmental Panel on Climate Change warned already in 2001 that small island countries will experience considerable economic and social consequences due to climate change.

Small island developing states make minimal contribution to global greenhouse gas emissions, with a combined total of less than 1%. However, that does not indicate that greenhouse emissions are not produced at all, and it is recorded that the annual total greenhouse gas emissions from islands could range from 292.1 to 29,096.2 [metric] tonne CO_{2}-equivalent.

== Impacts ==
The global average sea level has risen about 250 millimetres (9.8 in) since 1880.

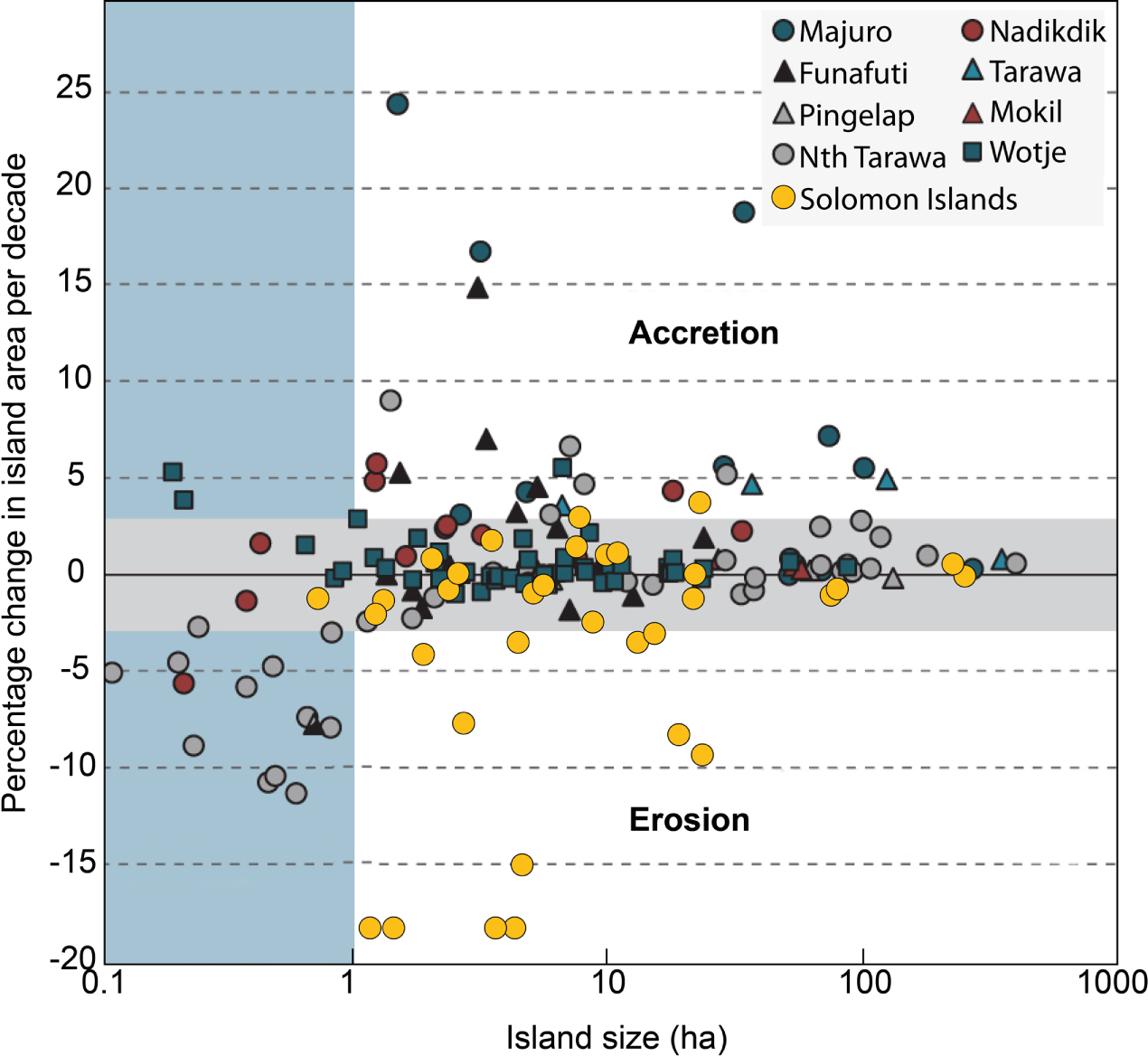
Surface area change of islands in the Central Pacific and Solomon Islands

=== Sea level rise ===
Sea level rise is especially threatening to low-lying island nations because seas are encroaching upon limited habitable land and threatening existing cultures. Stefan Rahmstorf, a professor of Ocean Physics at Potsdam University in Germany, notes "even limiting warming to 2 degrees, in my view, will still commit some island nations and coastal cities to drown."

The sea level has generally been rising since the end of the Last Glacial Maximum, which was around 20,000 years ago. Between 1901 and 2018, the global average sea level rose by 15–25 cm (6–10 in), with an increase of 2.3 mm (0.091 in) per year since the 1970s. This was faster than the sea level had ever risen over at least the past 3,000 years. The rate accelerated to 4.62 mm (0.182 in)/yr for the decade 2013–2022. Climate change due to human activities is the main cause of this persistent acceleration. Between 1993 and 2018, melting ice sheets and glaciers accounted for 44% of sea level rise, with another 42% resulting from thermal expansion of water.

Sea level rise lags behind changes in the Earth's temperature by decades, and sea level rise will therefore continue to accelerate between now and 2050 in response to warming that has already happened. What happens after that depends on future human greenhouse gas emissions. According to modelling in the early 2020s, if there are very deep cuts in emissions, sea level rise would slow down between 2050 and 2100. In that scenario, it would rise by between 30 cm (1 ft) and 1.0 m (3 1/3 ft) between the early 2020s and 2100, or by approximately 60 cm (2 ft) to 130 cm (4 1/2 ft) from the 19th century to 2100. With high emissions it would instead accelerate further, and could rise by 50 cm (1.6 ft) or even by 1.9 m (6.2 ft) by 2100. In the long run, sea level rise would amount to 2–3 m (7–10 ft) over the next 2000 years if warming stays to its current 1.5 °C (2.7 °F) over the pre-industrial past. It would be 19–22 metres (62–72 ft) if warming peaks at 5 °C (9.0 °F). The expected increase in flood hazard potential is often exceedingly large even for modest sea-level rise scenarios, ranging from 10 to 1000 for rises of 0.5 m or less.

=== Changes in temperatures and rain ===
Atmospheric temperature extremes have already increased in frequency and intensity in SIDS and are projected to continue along this trend. Heavy precipitation events in SIDS have also increased in frequency and intensity and are expected to further increase.

=== Agriculture and fisheries ===
Climate change poses a risk to food security in many Pacific Islands, impacting fisheries and agriculture. As sea level rises, island nations are at increased risk of losing coastal arable land to degradation as well as salination. Once the limited available soil on these islands becomes salinated, it becomes very difficult to produce subsistence crops such as breadfruit. This would severely impact the agricultural and commercial sector in nations such as the Marshall Islands and Kiribati.

In addition, local fisheries would also be affected by higher ocean temperatures and increased ocean acidification. As ocean temperatures rise and the pH of oceans decreases, many fish and other marine species would die out or change their habits and range. As well as this, water supplies and local ecosystems such as mangroves, are threatened by global warming.

=== Economic impacts ===
SIDS may also have reduced financial and human capital to mitigate climate change risk, as many rely on international aid to cope with disasters like severe storms. Worldwide, climate change is projected to cause an average annual loss of 0.5% GDP by 2030; in Pacific SIDS, it will be 0.75–6.5% GDP by 2030. Caribbean SIDS will have average annual losses of 5% by 2025, escalating to 20% by 2100 in projections without regional mitigation strategies. The tourism sector of many island countries is particularly threatened by increased occurrences of extreme weather events such as hurricanes and droughts.

=== Public health ===
Climate change impacts small island ecosystems in ways that have a detrimental effect on public health. In island nations, changes in sea levels, temperature, and humidity may increase the prevalence of mosquitoes and diseases carried by them such as malaria and Zika virus. Rising sea levels and severe weather such as flooding and droughts may render agricultural land unusable and contaminate freshwater drinking supplies. Flooding and rising sea levels also directly threaten populations, and in some cases may be a threat to the entire existence of the island.

=== Others ===
Other impacts on small islands include:

- deterioration in coastal conditions, such as beach erosion and coral bleaching, which will likely affect local resources such as fisheries, as well as the value of tourism destinations.
- reduction of already limited water resources to the point that they become insufficient to meet demand during low-rainfall periods by mid-century, especially on small islands (such as in the Caribbean and the Pacific Ocean)
- invasion by non-native species increasing with higher temperatures, particularly in mid- and high-latitude islands.

== Adaptation ==
Governments face a complex task when combining grey infrastructure with green infrastructure and nature-based solutions to help with disaster risk management in areas such as flood control, early warning systems, and integrated water resource management. A 2026 methodical review of 53 nature-based solutions (NbS) interventions throughout 26 small island developing (SID) countries show 72% of reported outcomes showing predominantly positive results in the diminution of climate hazard impacts.

=== Relocation and migration ===
Climate migration has been discussed in popular media as a potential adaptation approach for the populations of islands threatened by sea level rise. These depictions are often sensationalist or problematic, although migration may likely form a part of adaptation. Mobility has long been a part of life in islands, but could be used in combination with local adaptation measures.

A study that engaged the experiences of residents in atoll communities found that the cultural identities of these populations are strongly tied to these lands. Human rights activists argue that the potential loss of entire atoll countries, and consequently the loss of national sovereignty, self-determination, cultures, and indigenous lifestyles cannot be compensated for financially. Some researchers suggest that the focus of international dialogues on these issues should shift from ways to relocate entire communities to strategies that instead allow for these communities to remain on their lands.

=== Climate resilient economies ===
Many SIDS now understand the need to move towards low-carbon, climate resilient economies, as set out in the Caribbean Community (CARICOM) implementation plan for climate change-resilient development. SIDS often rely heavily on imported fossil fuels, spending an ever-larger proportion of their GDP on energy imports. Renewable technologies have the advantage of providing energy at a lower cost than fossil fuels and making SIDS more sustainable. Barbados has been successful in adopting the use of solar water heaters (SWHs). A 2012 report published by the Climate & Development Knowledge Network showed that its SWH industry now boasts over 50,000 installations. These have saved consumers as much as US$137 million since the early 1970s. The report suggested that Barbados' experience could be easily replicated in other SIDS with high fossil fuel imports and abundant sunshine.

=== International cooperation ===
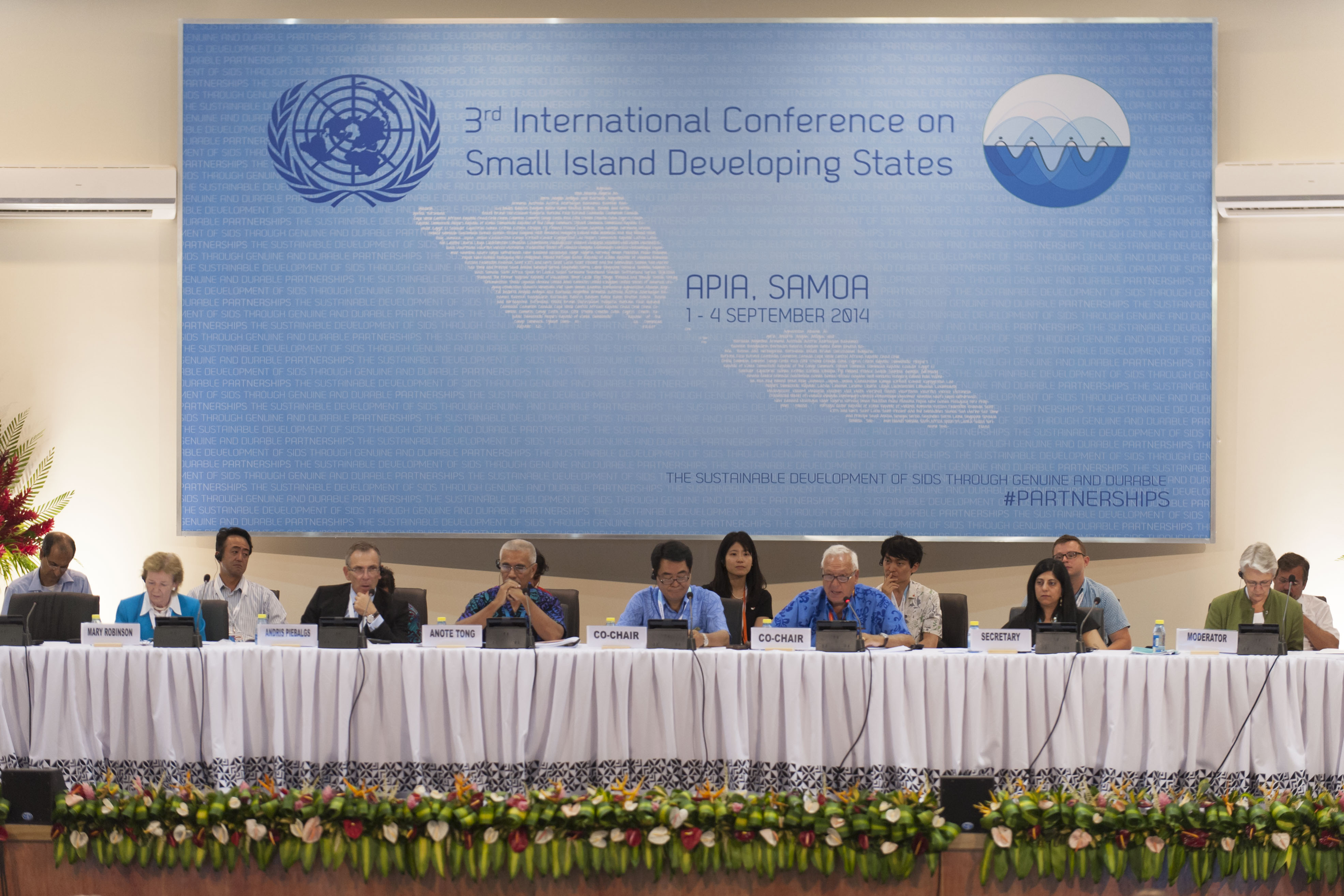
International meeting of Small Island Developing States in 2014.

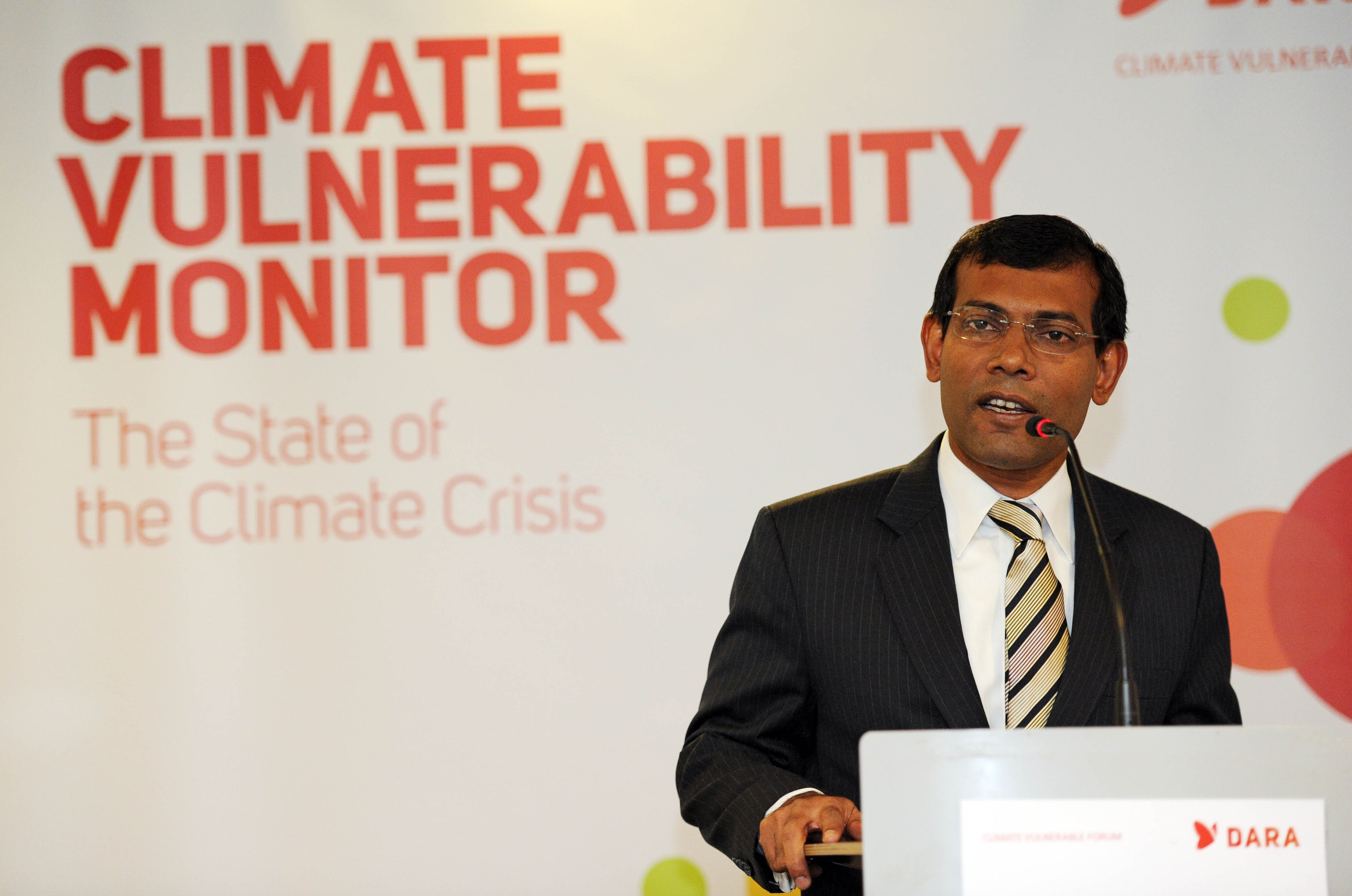
Maldives President Mohamed Nasheed speaks at the launch of the Climate Vulnerability Monitor in 2010.

The governments of several island nations have made political advocacy for greater international ambition on climate change mitigation and climate change adaptation a component of their foreign policy and international alliances.

The Alliance of Small Island States (ASIS) has been a strong negotiating group in the UNFCCC, highlighting that although they are negligible contributors to anthropogenic climate change, they are among the most vulnerable to its impacts. The 43 members of the alliance have held the position of limiting global warming to 1.5°C, and advocated for this at the 2015 United Nations Climate Change Conference, influencing the goals of the Paris Agreement. Marshall Islands Prime Minister Tony deBrum was central in forming the High Ambition Coalition at the conference. Meetings of the Pacific Islands Forum have also discussed the issue.

The Maldives and Tuvalu particularly have played a prominent role on the international stage. In 2002, Tuvalu threatened to sue the United States and Australia in the International Court of Justice for their contribution to climate change and for not ratifying the Kyoto Protocol. The governments of both of these countries have cooperated with environmental advocacy networks, non-governmental organisations and the media to draw attention to the threat of climate change to their countries. At the 2009 United Nations Climate Change Conference, Tuvalu delegate Ian Fry spearheaded an effort to halt negotiations and demand a comprehensive, legally binding agreement.

As of March 2022, the Asian Development Bank has committed $3.62 billion to help small island developing states with climate change, transport, energy, and health projects.

The Maltese sociologist Godfrey Baldacchino disagrees with how many international institutions and experts present Small Island Developing States' struggles against global warming. In his opinion, they advise residents of these states to remain resilient, in effect fostering "a condition of insecurity and threat" rather than "a different, more emancipatory kind of collective agency". They label residents as victims but not "environmental refugees" so that other countries may thwart their responsibility to help. Moreover, he adds, these institutions fasten onto the future effects of global warming while small island developing states find themselves "burdened with securing their present".

== By country and region ==
=== Caribbean ===
Climate change today encompasses not only global warming, which refers to the alarming and continuous rise in the planet's average surface temperature, but also the extensive and multifaceted impacts this phenomenon has on Earth's climate. These effects are manifested in various ways, including altered weather patterns, increased frequency and intensity of extreme weather events, melting ice caps, rising sea levels, and shifts in ecosystem dynamics. Climate change accounts for historical long-term fluctuations in Earth's climate, highlighting the natural variability of climate over millennia but underscoring the unprecedented rate of current change attributed to human activities.

Graph showing historic temperature change globally and in the Caribbean region.

Climate change presents significant risks to the Caribbean islands. Key environmental changes anticipated in the region include rising sea levels, more intense hurricanes, longer dry seasons, and shorter wet seasons. As a result, climate change is likely to impact the economy, which is heavily dependent on tourism, the environment, and the population of the Caribbean.

=== East Timor ===
East Timor, or Timor-Leste, faces numerous challenges as a result of climate change and increased global temperatures. As an island country, rising sea levels threaten its coastal areas, including the capital city Dili. The country is considered highly vulnerable and is expected to experience worsening cyclones, flooding, heatwaves, and drought. As a large percentage of the population is dependent on local agriculture, these changes are expected to impact industry in the country as well.

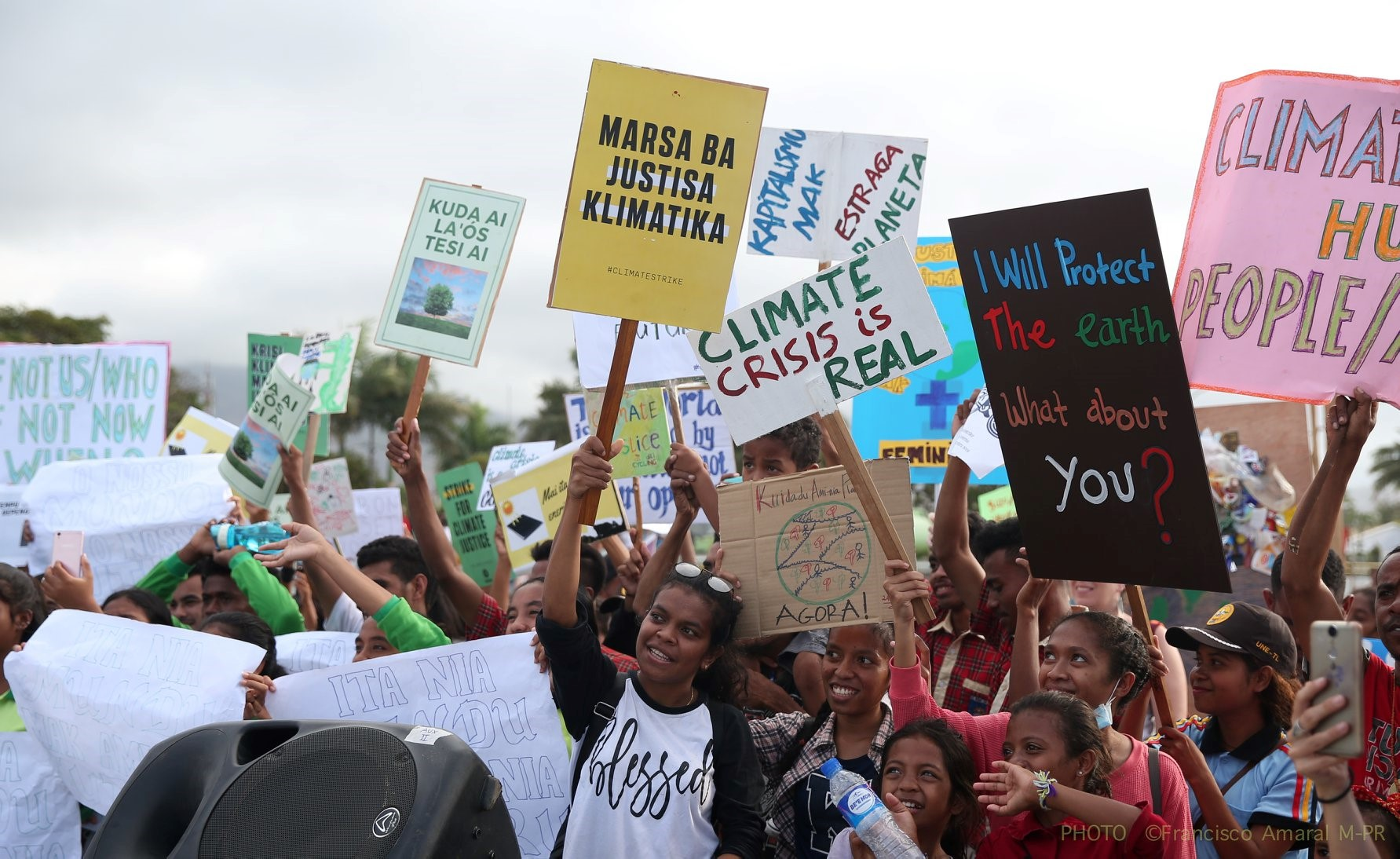
September 2019 climate strikes in Dili, East Timor.

=== Maldives ===
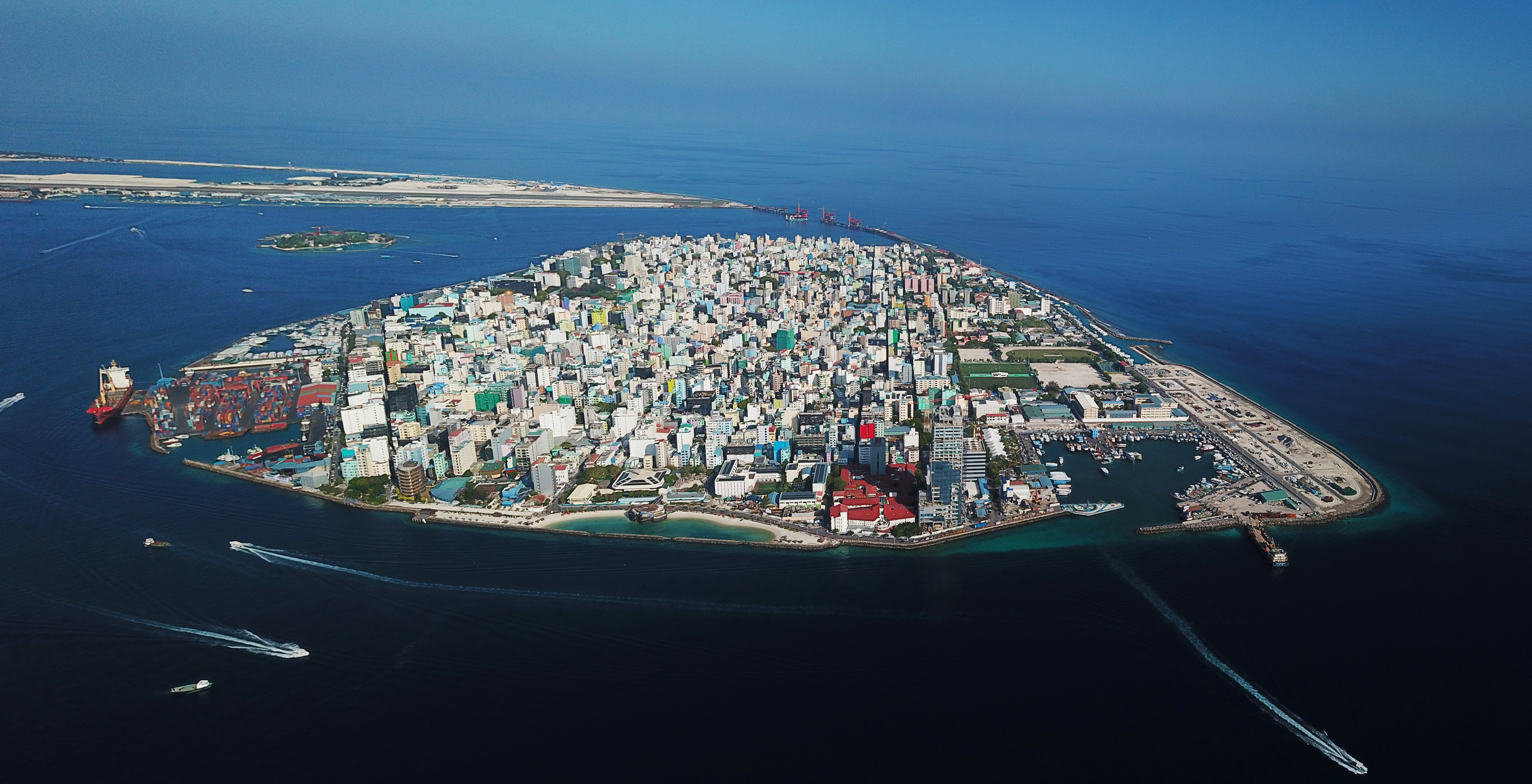
The Maldives government have adapted infrastructure in capital city Malé to the threats of climate change, including beginning to build a wall around the city.

Climate change is a major issue for the Maldives. As an archipelago of low-lying islands and atolls in the Indian Ocean, the existence of the Maldives is severely threatened by sea level rise. By 2050, 80% of the country could become uninhabitable due to global warming. According to the World Bank, with "future sea levels projected to increase in the range of 10 to 100 centimeters by the year 2100, the entire country could be submerged". The Maldives is striving to adapt to climate change, and Maldivian authorities have been prominent in international political advocacy to implement climate change mitigation.

=== Pacific islands ===
==== Fiji ====
Climate change in Fiji is an exceptionally pressing issue for the country - as an island nation, Fiji is particularly vulnerable to rising sea levels, coastal erosion and extreme weather. These changes, along with temperature rise, will displace Fijian communities and will prove disruptive to the national economy - tourism, agriculture and fisheries, the largest contributors to the nation's GDP, will be severely impacted by climate change causing increases in poverty and food insecurity. As a party to both the Kyoto Protocol and the Paris Climate Agreement, Fiji hopes to achieve net-zero emissions by 2050, which, along with national policies, will help to mitigate the impacts of climate change.

The Human Rights Measurement Initiative finds that the climate crisis has worsened human rights conditions moderately (4.6 out of 6) in Fiji.

==== Kiribati ====
The existence of the nation of Kiribati is imperilled by rising sea levels, with the country losing land every year. Many of its islands are currently or becoming uninhabitable due to their shrinking size. Thus, the majority of the country's population resides in only a handful of islands, with more than half of its residents living on one island alone, Tarawa. This leads to other issues such as severe overcrowding in such a small area. In 1999, the uninhabited islands of Tebua Tarawa and Abanuea both disappeared underwater. The government's Kiribati Adaptation Program was launched in 2003 to mitigate the country's vulnerability to the issue. In 2008, fresh water supplies began being encroached by seawater, prompting President Anote Tong to request international assistance to begin relocating the country's population elsewhere.

==== Marshall Islands ====
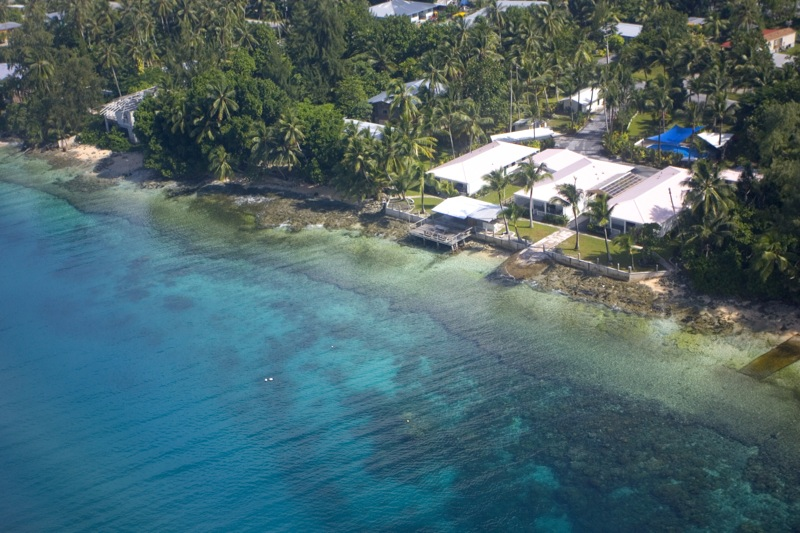
Image of Majuro, Marshall Islands

Climate change in the Marshall Islands is a major issue for the country. As with many countries made up of low-lying islands, the Marshall Islands is highly vulnerable to sea level rise and other impacts of climate change. The atoll and capital city of Majuro are particularly vulnerable, and the issue poses significant implications for the country's population. These threats have prompted Marshallese political leaders to make climate change a key diplomatic issue, who have responded with initiatives such as the Majuro Declaration.

The Human Rights Measurement Initiative finds that the climate crisis has worsened human rights conditions in the Marshall Islands greatly (5.0 out of 6). Human rights experts reported that the climate crisis has negatively impacted the economy, increased rates of unemployment, and lead to relocations to higher areas or migrations to other countries.

==== Palau ====
The Palau government are concerned about the effects of climate change on the island nation. In 2008 Palau requested that the UN Security Council consider protection against rising sea levels due to climate change.

Tommy Remengesau, the president of Palau, has said:

Palau has lost at least one third of its coral reefs due to climate change related weather patterns. We also lost most of our agricultural production due to drought and extreme high tides. These are not theoretical, scientific losses -- they are the losses of our resources and our livelihoods.... For island states, time is not running out. It has run out. And our path may very well be the window to your own future and the future of our planet.

==== Solomon Islands ====
Between 1947 and 2014, six islands of the Solomon Islands disappeared due to sea level rise, while another six shrunk by between 20 and 62 per cent. Nuatambu Island was the most populated of these with 25 families living on it; 11 houses washed into the sea by 2011.

The Human Rights Measurement Initiative finds that the climate crisis has worsened human rights conditions in the Solomon Islands greatly (5.0 out of 6). Human rights experts provided that the climate crisis has contributed to conflict in communities, negative future socio-economic outlook, and food instability.

==== Tuvalu ====
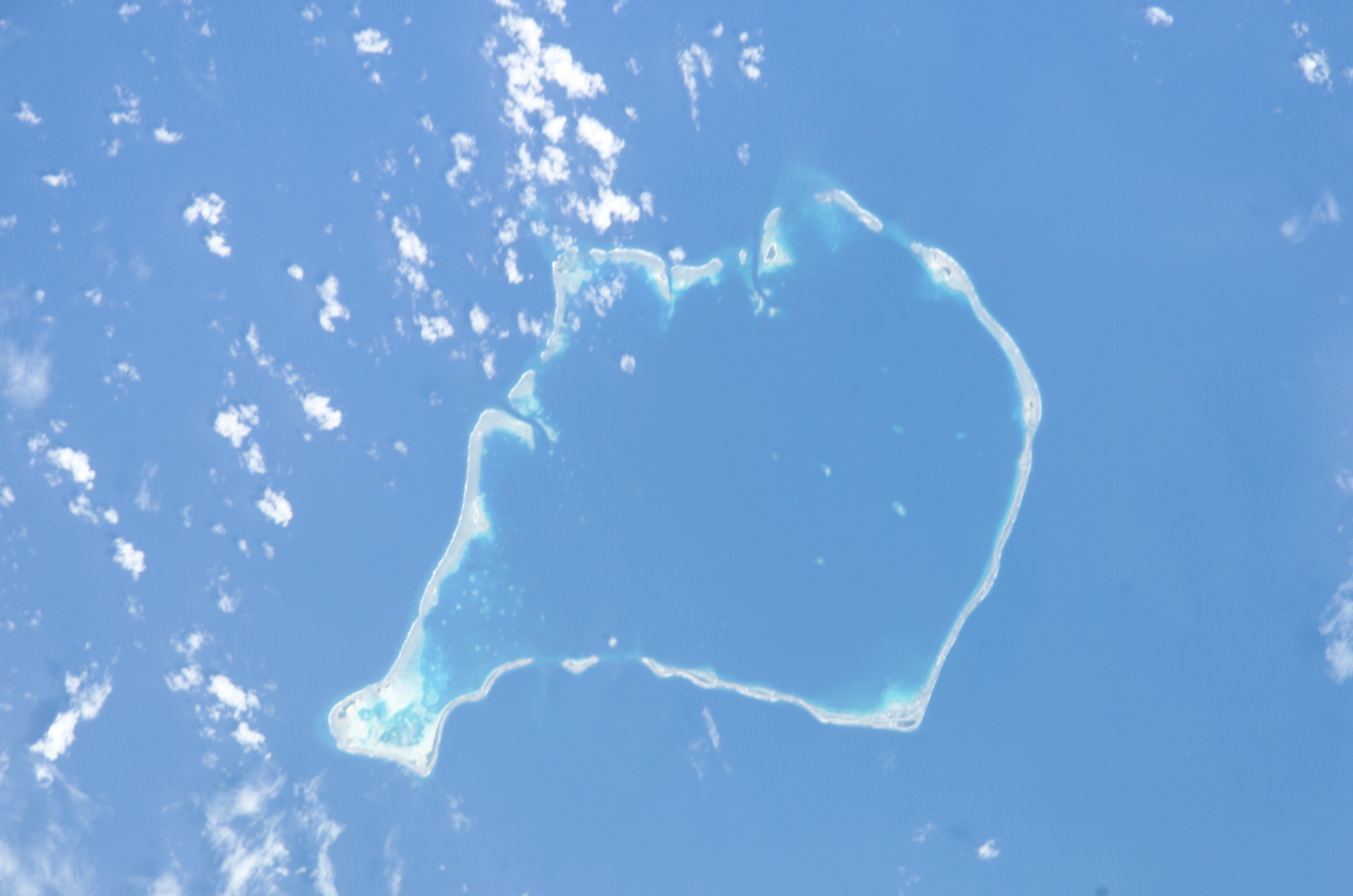
Satellite Image of Funafuti Atoll, Tuvalu

Tuvalu is a small Polynesian island nation located in the Pacific Ocean. It can be found about halfway between Hawaii and Australia. It is made up of nine tiny islands, five of which are coral atolls while the other four consists of land rising from the sea bed. All are low-lying islands with no point on Tuvalu being higher than 4.5m above sea level. The analysis of 15 1/2 years of sea level data from Funafuti, identified that the sea level rise rate was 5.9 mm per year (in the 15 1/2 years to September 2008) and the sea level in the Funafuti area rose approximately 9.14 cm during that period of time. As well as this, the dangerous peak high tides in Tuvalu are becoming higher causing greater danger. In response to sea level rise, Tuvalu is considering resettlement plans in addition to pushing for increased action in confronting climate change at the UN. On 10 November 2023, Tuvalu signed the Falepili Union, a bilateral diplomatic relationship with Australia, under which Australia will provide a pathway for citizens of Tuvalu to migrate to Australia, to enable climate-related mobility for Tuvaluans.

=== São Tomé and Príncipe ===
Between 1950 and 2010, São Tomé and Príncipe experienced an increase of 1.5 °C in average annual temperature due to climate change. The country is considered highly vulnerable to its impacts. Climate change is projected to lead to an increased number of warm days and nights, hotter temperatures and increased precipitation. Sea level rise and saltwater intrusion will be major issues for the islands and climate change will have major impacts on agriculture in the country. The government began developing a National Adaptation Plan in 2022 to implement climate adaptation efforts, with support from the United Nations Environment Programme.

=== Seychelles ===
In the Seychelles, the impacts of climate change were observable in precipitation, air temperature and sea surface temperature by the early 2000s. Climate change poses a threat to its coral reef ecosystems, with drought conditions in 1999 and a mass bleaching event in 1998. Water management will be critically impacted.

=== Singapore ===
Singapore adopts a proactive long-term effort in addressing rising sea-levels, temperature increases due to global warming, and reducing greenhouse gas emissions.

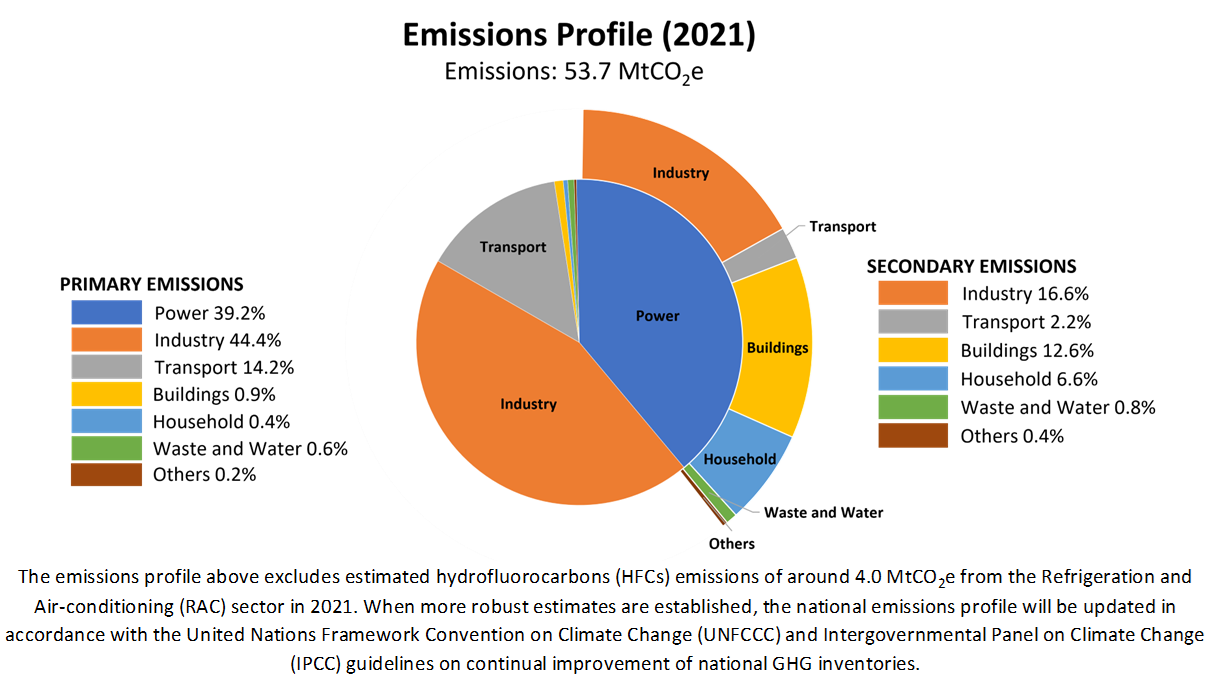
Singapore's 2021 emissions profile

As of 2022, compared to other ASEAN countries, Singapore has the second highest per capita CO_{2} emissions at 8.9 tonnes, and ranks sixth in total annual CO_{2} emissions at 53.25 million tonnes.

== Climate Context ==
The Paris Agreement of 2015 seeks to stabilize the global mean sea level by limiting warming to “well below 2.0 ◦C above preindustrial levels” and to further pursue efforts to limit the temperature increase to 1.5 ◦C above pre-industrial levels.

Small island states have pressed for the more stringent 1.5°C target as a matter of survival since at least the 15th Conference of the Parties in Copenhagen in 2009, which produced the non-binding Copenhagen Accord.

Current national policies and pledges leave the world on a trajectory of roughly 2.6–2.9 °C of warming by 2100. An increase of 2.5°C would likely lead to a rise of global mean sea level of fifty-eight centimeters, or about two feet, with an uncertainty range of between thirty-seven and ninety-three centimeters by 2100, with sea levels continuing to rise after that. Under the intermediate (SSP2-4.5) emissions scenario associated with warming in this range, the IPCC’s Sixth Assessment Report projects a likely global mean sea-level rise of around 56 cm (a likely range of 43–76 cm) by 2100 relative to 1995–2014 levels, with sea levels continuing to rise for centuries afterward regardless of the emissions pathway eventually followed.

Atoll nations like Kiribati, the Marshall Islands, and Tuvalu in the Pacific, and the Maldives in the Indian Ocean, are especially vulnerable, since they consist entirely of low-lying coral reefs rising only a few metres above the sea level. In some Pacific regions, sea level rise has been occurring two to three times more quickly than the global average. A 2018 study concluded that wave-driven flooding, exacerbated by sea-level rise, would likely render most atoll islands uninhabitable by the middle of the 21st century, well before they are fully submerged.

Flooding from storm surge and high tides, which already make life on these islands difficult, can compromise habitability even before land is fully submerged. Like in 2013, the Marshall Islands suffered an extreme drought that threatened drinking water and crops where the country primarily depended on rainwater harvesting and shallow underground freshwater lenses for its drinking water and even a minor increase in sea level can submerge these islands permanently damaging freshwater resources thus making the island inhabitable.

A number of SIDS have developed creative solutions, such as polders and coastal defenses, to preserve their own survival in the face of significant sea-level rise. Nevertheless, these conservationist and short-term preventive actions are insufficient to prevent their region from being completely or partially submerged. SIDS and the International Commission propose some solutions themselves, like nations ex situ, creation of artificial territory, floating states, and purchasing and leasing of territories, but most lack the financial resources to fund these measures without substantial international assistance, which has not materialized at the scale needed.

== International Legal Developments ==
=== ITLOS Advisory opinion (2024) ===
The Commission of Small Island States on Climate Change and International Law (COSIS) was established in November 2021 by Antigua and Barbuda and Tuvalu to pursue international legal avenues, including advisory opinions, addressing the impact of climate change on small island states. Following a request COSIS submitted in December 2022, the International Tribunal for the Law of the Sea delivered a unanimous advisory opinion on 21 May 2024 finding that anthropogenic greenhouse gas emissions constitute marine pollution under the United Nations Convention on the Law of the Sea (UNCLOS), and that states have specific, stringent due-diligence obligations under UNCLOS Article 194 to prevent, reduce, and control such pollution, including its contributions to ocean warming, sea-level rise, and acidification. It was the first advisory opinion issued by an international tribunal on climate change.

=== Pacific Islands Forum Declaration on Preserving Maritime Zones (2021) ===
At the 51st Pacific Islands Forum on 6 August 2021, its 18 member states adopted the Declaration on Preserving Maritime Zones in the Face of Climate Change-related Sea-Level Rise. The declaration asserts that under UNCLOS, there is no obligation to keep the baselines and outer limits of maritime zones under review, and that once a state’s maritime zones have been established and notified to the UN Secretary-General, they will continue to apply “without reduction” notwithstanding physical changes caused by sea-level rise.

=== Inter-American Court of Human Rights advisory opinion (2025) ===
Following a request by Chile and Colombia, the Inter-American Court of Human Rights issued Advisory Opinion OC-32/25 on 3 July 2025, setting out an enhanced due-diligence standard for states responding to the “climate emergency” and linking climate degradation to human dignity and to human rights obligations under the American Convention on Human Rights. The proceedings drew 263 written submissions from 613 participants, making them the most participatory advisory proceedings in the court’s history.

=== ICJ Advisory Opinion (2025) ===
The push for an ICJ opinion originated with a 2019 campaign by Pacific Island Students Fighting Climate Change (PISFCC), a group of law students at the University of the South Pacific in Vanuatu, who lobbied Pacific governments to seek an advisory opinion from the court. Vanuatu adopted the campaign, and on 29 March 2023 the United Nations General Assembly adopted Resolution 77/276 by consensus, formally requesting the opinion.

On 23 July 2025, the ICJ delivered a unanimous advisory opinion on the Obligations of States in Respect of Climate Change, in its first opinion addressing the international legal framework applicable to climate change, and the third climate-related advisory opinion issued by an international tribunal within roughly fourteen months. The court found that climate change poses an “urgent and existential threat” to which states are legally obligated to respond. On the two questions most directly relevant to statehood, the court held, first, that states party to UNCLOS are not required to update their maritime baselines or the geographical coordinates of their maritime zones merely because sea-level rise has physically altered their coastlines, so that established maritime entitlements are not lost; and second, that once a state has been established, the disappearance of one of the constituent elements of statehood does not necessarily mean that the state loses its legal personality (§363) meaning a state can, in principle, continue to exist even if sea-level rise causes the loss of its physical territory.

The Pacific Islands Forum welcomed the opinion, describing it as a “legal roadmap” for global climate action, and reiterated the position, first articulated in its 2021 declaration, that climate change and sea-level rise should not be permitted to threaten the continuity of member states statehood, sovereignty, maritime zones, or international legal personality, and called for international cooperation to protect the human rights, culture, identity, and dignity of affected populations.

=== The Falepili Union ===
On 9 November 2023, Australia and Tuvalu signed the Falepili Union treaty, which entered into force on 28 August 2024. The treaty was the first bilateral agreement in which one state formally recognizes another’s continuing statehood and sovereignty despite territorial loss driven by sea-level rise, providing that “Tuvalu’s statehood and sovereignty will continue, notwithstanding the impacts of climate change related sea level rise”. It also establishes a special mobility pathway, opened in 2025, under which up to 280 Tuvaluan citizens per year may choose to live, work, or study in Australia, alongside Australian commitments to assist Tuvalu in the event of major natural disasters, health pandemics, or military aggression.

=== UN General Assembly follow-up (2026) ===
In May 2026 the UN General Assembly adopted, by an overwhelming majority, a climate accountability resolution endorsing the 2025 ICJ advisory opinion, affirming that states have legal duties to address climate change and its human rights impacts, prevent further harm, and cooperate to remedy existing damage. Vanuatu, which faces serious risks from sea-level rise, led the initiative. As of mid-2026, UN member states are separately negotiating a draft Declaration on Sea-Level Rise intended to directly address statehood continuity and maritime entitlements for states facing submersion, with adoption targeted for the General Assembly’s September 2026 session; Vanuatu and other Pacific partners have also proposed a draft resolution intended to help operationalise the ICJ’s 2025 opinion.

== See also ==
- Ambo Declaration
- Baku Communiqué
- Climate change in Singapore
- Islands First
- Majuro Declaration
- Tarawa Climate Change Conference
