= Majuro Declaration =

Initiative of the Pacific Islands Forum

Information
- Date: 5 September 2013
- Location: Majuro, Marshall Islands
- Participants: Pacific Islands Forum member countries

The Majuro Declaration is an initiative of the Pacific Islands Forum, (Note: The members of the Pacific Islands Forum are Australia, Cook Islands, Federated States of Micronesia, Fiji, Kiribati, Nauru, New Zealand, Niue, Palau, Papua New Guinea, Republic of Marshall Islands, Samoa, Solomon Islands, Tonga, Tuvalu, and Vanuatu) which was signed on 5 September 2013 at Majuro in the Marshall Islands during the 44th Pacific Islands Forum summit. At the summit the leaders of the Pacific Islands Forum nations recognised the need for strengthened national systems to plan for, access, deliver, absorb and monitor climate change and for donor countries to continue to simplify and harmonise their assessment, implementation and reporting processes for financing projects directed to climate change adaptation, mitigation and risk reduction.

The intention of the Majuro Declaration is to highlight the commitment of the leaders of the Pacific Islands Forum nations to the reduction and phasing down of greenhouse gas pollution worldwide, with the leaders wanting to spark a "new wave of climate leadership".

== Background ==
Following climate-related emergencies that occurred in the Marshall Islands, Tony de Brum, the foreign minister, called for countries to turn the crises into an opportunity for climate leadership. He demanded a new commitment and international leadership to stave off further climate disasters from battering his country, and other similarly vulnerable countries.

The Declaration referred to the overwhelming scientific consensus regarding the impact of greenhouse gas (GHG) emissions on climate change and referred to the recent measurements of greenhouse gas concentrations:

"On 9 May 2013, atmospheric concentrations measured near the summit of Mauna Loa in Hawaiʻi exceeded 400 parts per million for the first time since measurements began. In crossing this historic threshold, the world entered a new danger zone. Unless we quickly change course, global average temperatures are projected to rise by 4°C or more above pre-industrial levels by the end of the Century, resulting in unprecedented human and environmental impacts".

== Intent ==
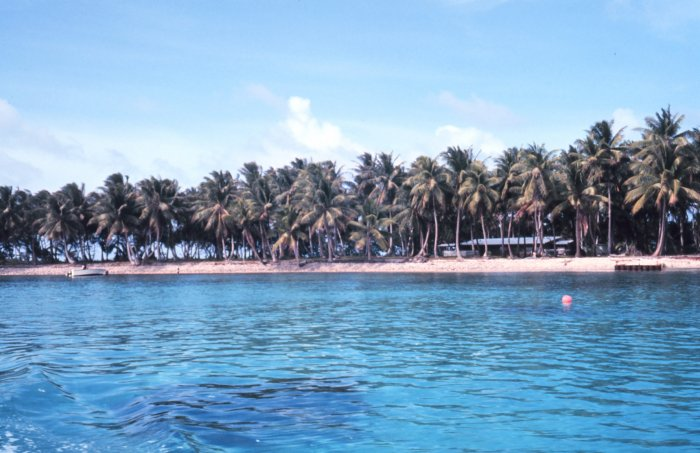
Lagoon shoreline on Majuro

The intention of the Majuro Declaration is to spark a "new wave of climate leadership" and to highlight the impact of climate change in the Pacific Ocean. The Pacific Islands Forum secretary general Tuiloma Neroni Slade explained what the Declaration aims to achieve: "So this is a declaration of responsibility. They have pledged to commit themselves as climate leaders and to demonstrate this leadership by attaching in this declaration what each is doing as part of their commitment to ameliorate emissions."

The Majuro Declaration sets out ambitious commitments of the signatories to reduce emissions and their desire to cooperate with other countries, in particular Post-Forum Dialogue Partners, (Note: The PIF Dialogue Partners are Canada, People's Republic of China, European Union, France, India, Indonesia, Italy, Japan, Republic of Korea, Malaysia, Philippines, Thailand, United Kingdom and the United States.) as well as any, "economic entity, company, civil society organization or individual', to "demonstrate climate leadership through action that contributes to the urgent reduction and phase down of greenhouse gas pollution".

== 20th United Nations Climate Change Conference - 2014 ==
Marshall Islands President Christopher Loeak presented the Majuro Declaration to the UN Secretary-General Ban Ki-moon during General Assembly Leaders' week from 23 September 2013. The Majuro Declaration was described as a "Pacific gift" to the UN Secretary-General in order to catalyze more ambitious climate action by world leaders beyond that achieved at the December 2009 United Nations Climate Change Conference (COP15). The Declaration was intended to mobilize political will for the 20th COP (2014), in order to achieve for a universal, ambitious and legally binding climate change agreement by 2015.

The Declaration notes that global average temperatures are projected to rise by 4.0 °C (7.2 °F), which is a challenge to the 2010 Cancún agreements that state that future global warming should be limited to below 2.0 °C (3.6 °F) relative to the pre-industrial level.

The Majuro Declaration states that "actions under it are intended to complement, strengthen and augment processes under way and commitments already made, including those under the United Nations Framework Convention on Climate Change and its Kyoto Protocol".

== Support ==
Signatories of support of the Declaration includes the United States including the state of Hawai`i.), the European Union and the United Kingdom. Costa Rica, France, Indonesia, Korea, Malaysia, Mexico and Thailand have announced they are "lending their support" to the Pacific Islands, and who are working towards a formal commitment to the declaration.

== See also ==
- Climate change in the Marshall Islands
- Climate change in the Pacific Islands

== Notes ==
Footnotes

Citations
