= Climate change in Fiji =

Emissions, impacts and responses of Fiji related to climate change

Climate change in Fiji is an exceptionally pressing issue for the country - as an island nation, Fiji is particularly vulnerable to rising sea levels, coastal erosion and extreme weather. These changes, along with temperature rise, will displace Fijian communities and will prove disruptive to the national economy - tourism, agriculture and fisheries, the largest contributors to the nation's GDP, will be severely impacted by climate change causing increases in poverty and food insecurity. As a party to both the Kyoto Protocol and the Paris Climate Agreement, Fiji hopes to achieve net-zero emissions by 2050, which, along with national policies, will help to mitigate the impacts of climate change.

The Human Rights Measurement Initiative finds that the climate crisis has worsened human rights conditions moderately (4.6 out of 6) in Fiji.

== Greenhouse gas emissions ==
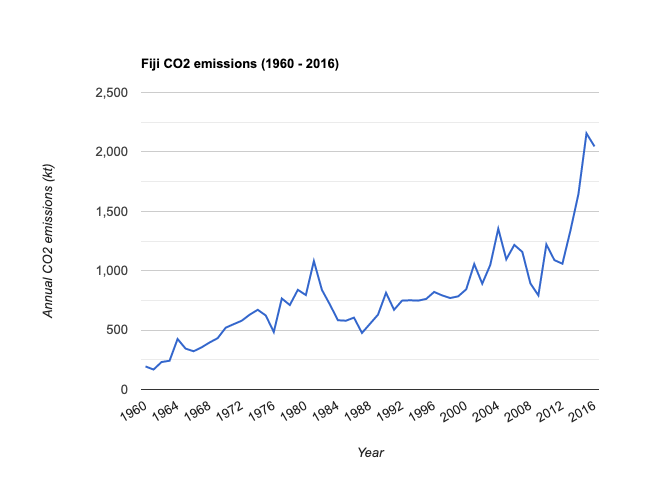
Fiji's annual carbon dioxide emissions between 1960 and 2016

Fiji's CO_{2} emissions have been steadily rising since the mid-1980s, and the country currently emits approximately 1.47 million metric tons of carbon dioxide per year, equating to 1.59 tons per capita. Despite its rising emissions, Fiji is still a very small contributor to global CO_{2} emissions, representing approximately 0.004% of global emissions in 2021. In terms of other greenhouse gases, Fiji's per capita methane and nitrous oxide emissions are low, equating to 0.72 tons and 0.19 tons respectively in 2021.

=== Energy production and consumption ===
Due to its lack of infrastructural capabilities, Fiji - like many other Pacific island nations - is still heavily dependent on oil imports to meet its energy needs. As such, 75% of Fiji's electricity was generated from oil, which accounted for 21.7% of its imports for 2019. In 2019, 25% of Fiji's energy came from renewable energy sources: 69% of renewable energy was generated from bioenergy, 30% from hydropower and the remaining 1% from solar.

Following the publication of the Climate Change Act 2021, which includes the commitment for all power to be generated from renewable sources by 2030, Fiji's renewable energy production has increased substantially. In 2021, fossil fuel generation dropped to 38.5% of Fiji's energy mix, while 61.5% came from renewable sources.

== Impacts on the natural environment ==
=== Temperature and weather change ===
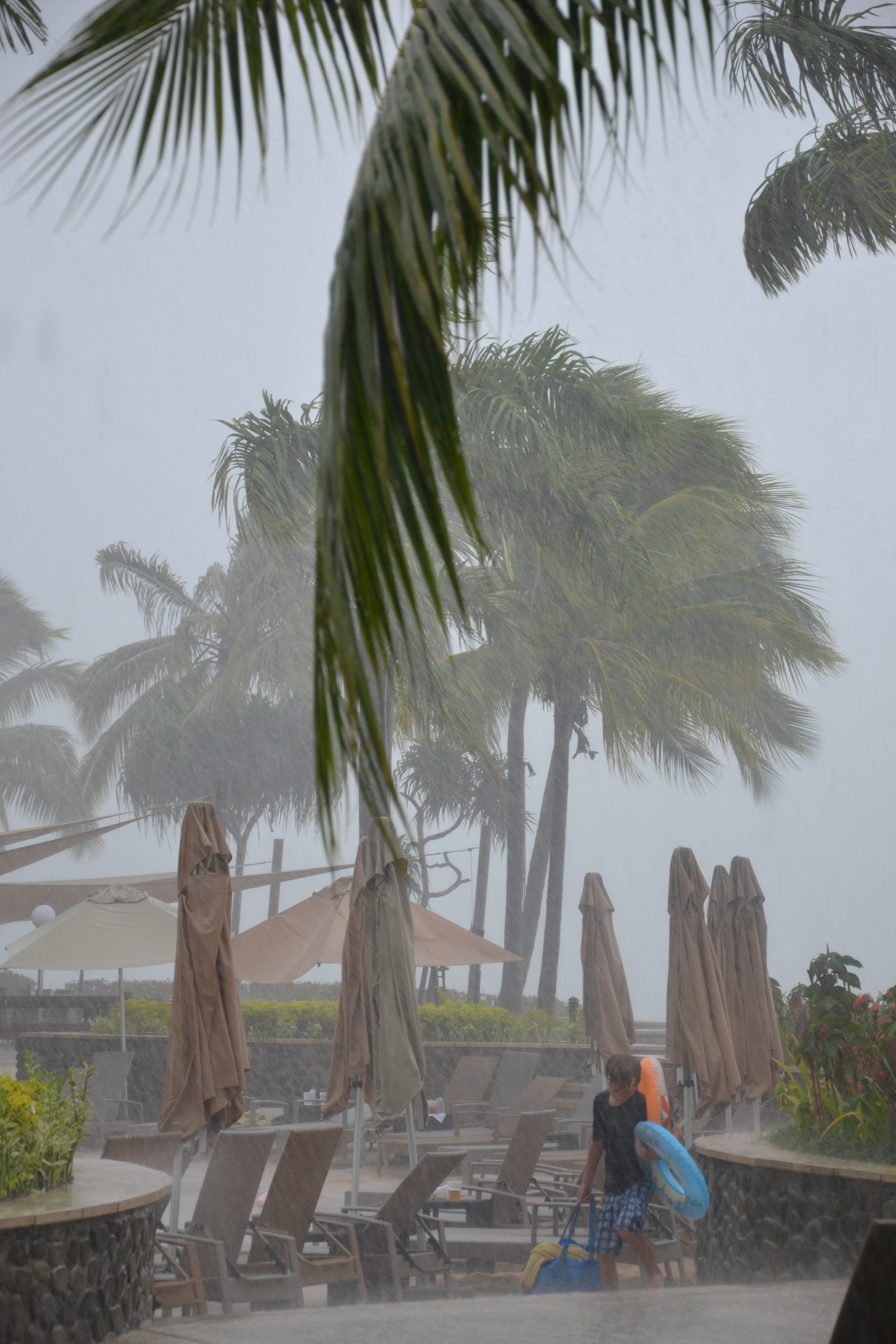
Tropical storm in Fiji, 2012

Similar to the majority of countries around the world, Fiji's temperature is rising as a result of climate change. The average maximum temperature of the country is rising at a rate of roughly 0.16 °C per year and has risen by almost 1.0 °C since 1950. Fiji's temperature is projected to continue to increase: under a high-emissions scenario, which assumes little to no change in greenhouse gas emissions, temperatures could rise by 0.4 °C - 1.0 °C by 2030.

Fiji's changing climate is causing higher rates of extreme weather, which Prime Minister Frank Bainimarama stated is creating an "almost constant level of threat" in Fiji, which he argues is causing the nation to engage in a "fight for survival". 12 cyclones have hit Fiji since 2016, including Cyclone Winston, a Category-5 tropical cyclone which impacted approximately 350,000 people and caused FJ$2.98 billion in damages. Studies show that while the future frequency of tropical cyclones will be largely unaffected or may even decrease as a result of climate change, the intensity of tropical cyclones is likely to increase, posing a greater risk to vulnerable low-lying nations such as Fiji. While Fiji's rainfall is not currently projected to be directly affected by climate change, flooding often occurs from heavy rainfall and sea swells resulting from passing cyclones.

=== Sea level rise ===
According to government estimates, Fiji's sea levels are rising at a rate of 4.6mm/year while sea level rise is expected to reach 0.21 to 0.48 metres by the end of the 21st century. It is estimated that the compound effects of sea level rise and storm surge may result in high numbers of temporary relocation of the inhabitants of Viti Levu, predominantly the northern and western parts.

The effects of sea level rise are already being felt on Fiji's coastal communities - in 2014, the village of Vunidogoloa became the first community that was forced to relocate 2 kilometres to escape from coastal erosion, saltwater intrusion and flooding as a result of sea level rise. The number of coastal communities that will be forced to relocate will only increase in the future: the government of Fiji has identified 830 communities vulnerable to climate-related impacts - of these, 48 require urgent relocation. Rising sea levels will have a large impact on Fiji's infrastructure - estimates suggest that 4.5% of buildings in Fiji will be inundated by a 22 cm sea level rise, which increases to 6.2% if the water level rises by 63 cm.

=== Water resources ===
Fiji has a high dependency on rainfall to secure fresh water and lacks the infrastructure to store and transport water, and as a result it is extremely vulnerable to drought. While Fiji's average rainfall is not expected to change in the future, the drought periods associated with El Niño will become more intense, resulting in Fiji's water security becoming more threatened in decades to come.

Additionally, warming temperatures are expected to increase evaporation of freshwater, while rising sea levels and storm surges will pose an increasing threat of salinisation to freshwater resources, particularly groundwater.

=== Ecosystems and biodiversity ===
==== Mangroves ====
Fiji's mangrove forests are of high ecological importance to the islands, as they provide protection from coastal erosion, create habitats for marine organisms and assist in reducing water sedimentation and pollution. Though data on mangrove abundance is quite dated, the most recent study calculated that Fiji's mangroves cover 517 km^{2}, giving it the third largest mangrove area in the Pacific Islands after Papua New Guinea and the Solomon Islands. Rising sea levels and associated coastal erosion pose a large threat to existing mangrove forests, as does the increasing salinisation of the oceans and the increasing intensity of tropical cyclones due to climate change, the latter of which was responsible for 77% of mangrove loss between 2001 and 2018.

The loss of mangrove forests would have a significant impact on the Fijian marine environment, as many plant and animal species depend on mangroves for nursery grounds and habitats. Mangrove conservation is also important as the ecosystem has one of the highest rates of carbon sequestration, so the reduction of Fiji's mangrove forests would release large amounts of stored CO_{2} and would greatly reduce the nation's emissions reduction capabilities.

==== Coral reefs ====
There is thought to be over 10,000 km^{2} of coral reefs in Fiji - these reefs are made up of a record 300 species of coral and are home to over 475 mollusc and 2,000 fish species. Climate change is posing a significant threat to reefs by elevating sea surface temperature - corals are highly sensitive to temperature changes, which can cause bleaching when severe. Additionally, the increasing concentration of CO_{2} in oceans as a result of climate change cause ocean acidification which weakens coral skeletons, making them more vulnerable to bioerosion, disease, bleaching and extreme weather events. As a result, an estimated 31% of Pacific coral reefs are at medium risk of degradation, while a further 10% are at high risk.

== Impacts on people ==
=== Agriculture and food security ===
Fiji's agricultural sector is of fundamental importance to its domestic economy - while it does form a large proportion of its GDP, the vast majority of Fijian agriculture is subsistence with an estimated 87% - 89% being owned under traditional governance systems. Due to the dependency of Fiji's rural population on natural resources and small-scale farming, Fijian agriculture is highly vulnerable to extreme weather events, rainfall and temperature variability and sea level rise resulting from climate change, all of which erode Fiji's long-term food security prospects.

Fiji's export crops, primarily sugar, will also become increasingly affected by the changing climate. The 2009 floods in Fiji caused FJ$24 million in damages to the sugar industry and caused an estimated 50% of affected sugarcane growers to fall below the poverty line in the aftermath. Sugar exports, which represented US$59.7 million in export value in 2019, will be largely unaffected by rising temperatures but face a large threat from the projected increase in frequency and intensity of extreme weather events in the region. Overall, it is thought that the greatest future climate change-related threat to Fijian agricultural will come from tropical storms, where the benefits of less frequent cyclones will be more than offset by the negative impact of increasing storm intensity.

=== Fisheries ===
As an island nation, Fiji has had a heavy reliance on fish for much of its history, both as a staple food and as an economic product. While fisheries only contributed 1.7% of total gross GDP between 2000 and 2008, it represented 12% of Fiji's exports in 2008, equivalent to US$63 million. However, the impact of climate change on the Pacific Ocean is expected to destabilise the marine environment which will pose a large threat to the Fijian fisheries industry: shrinking habitats and decreasing primary productivity as a result of phytoplankton and zooplankton die-offs.

Fiji's tuna industry will be particularly impacted by climate change - while tuna catches represented 60% of Fiji's 2008 fish exports, the warming of ocean waters due to climate change is affecting tuna migration patterns which is significantly lowering stocks in Fiji's waters. Since climate change will largely impact ocean fishing, Fiji is expected to gain a larger reliance on freshwater aquaculture in the future: while coastal fishing production has been modelled to decrease by 27% by 2050 under a baseline climate change scenario, freshwater fish production is expected to increase by an estimated 146% in the same time period; this increase may be as high as 266% if widespread aquaculture development occurs.

=== Tourism ===
Tourism is one of the most significant contributors to the Fijian economy, representing nearly 40% of its GDP and employing 150,000 people as of 2020; it is also Fiji's fastest-growing economic sector: in 2005 it represented only 17% of GDP and employed roughly 40,000 workers. As well as damage to tourist infrastructure and increasing instability of tourist volumes due to changing weather conditions, the Fijian government recognises that diverting investment into climate mitigation and adaption challenges will likely have a negative economic impact on the tourist industry.

However, perhaps the greatest impact that climate change has on Fijian tourism is through the degradation of the natural environment, particularly with reef degradation and coral bleaching: much of Fiji's tourism focuses on marine activities such as scuba diving, so the degradation of reef quality is resulting in lost revenue for the tourism industry and the gradual shift to inland tourism. In terms of economic losses, Fiji's tourism revenues are predicted to fall by roughly 35% between the present and 2100 as a result of climate change.

== Mitigation and adaptation ==
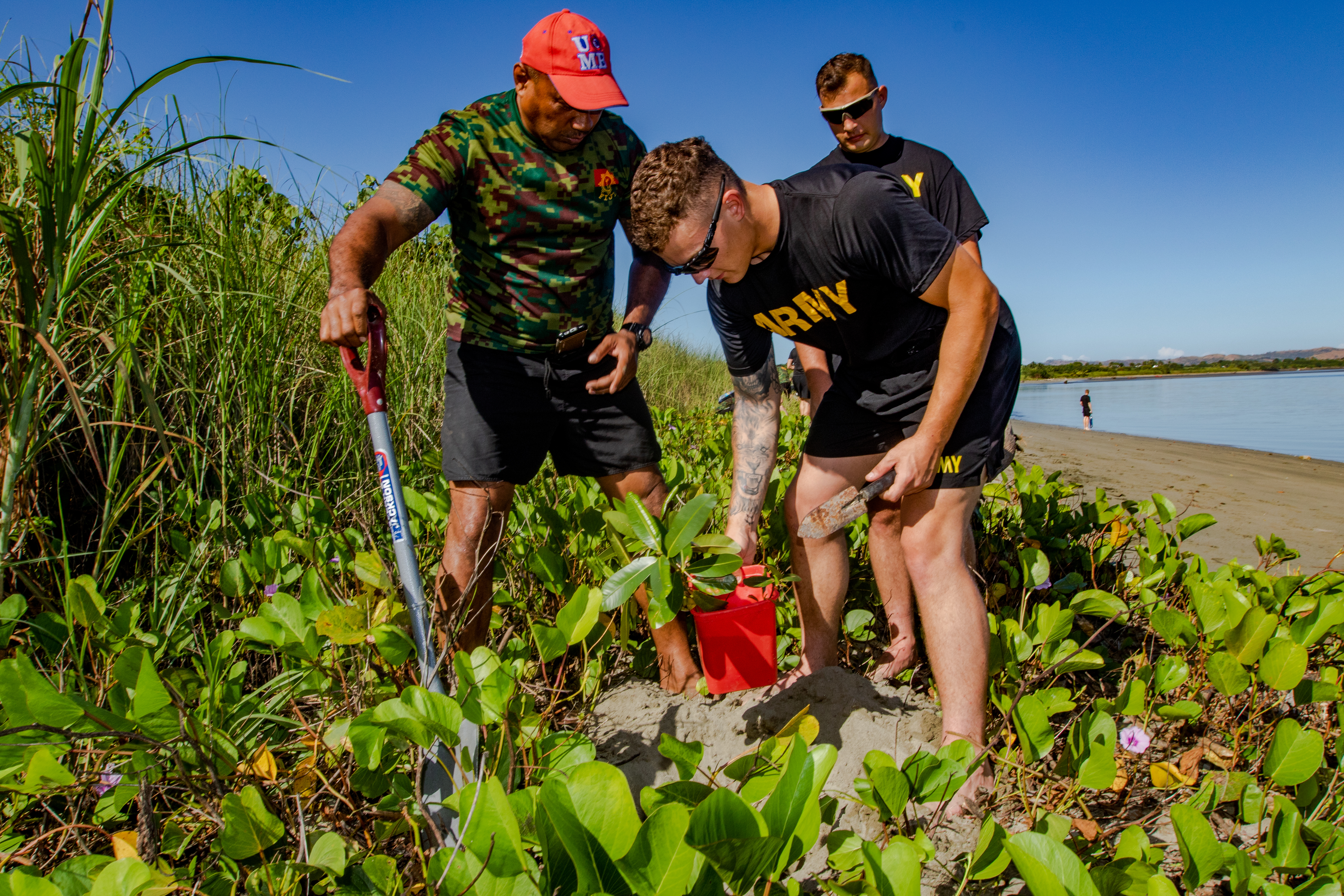
Planting mangroves along Fiji's coastline is one of many climate change mitigation projects taking place on the islands.

=== National policies and legislation ===
In order to implement its climate change commitments under the Paris Agreement, the Climate Change Act 2021 was approved by Fiji's parliament on 23 September 2021. As well as officially declaring a climate emergency, the bill sets out Fiji's climate mitigation and adaption strategies, outlines governmental responses to climate displacement and establishes committees, protocols and policies for attaining its climate change targets. Key targets set out by the Act include reaching net zero by 2050 and designating 30% of territorial waters as a marine protected area by 2030.

To conserve the local ecosystem and protect itself from future extreme weather events, Fiji has implemented a REDD+ programme (Reducing emissions from deforestation and forest degradation and the role of conservation, sustainable management of forests and enhancement of forest carbon stocks in developing countries) since 2009. The REDD+ programme is highly important to the environment of Fiji, as strengthening forestry sustainability will not only help to protect against soil erosion and protect coastlines from storm damage but will also allow for the sustainable exploitation of forest resources into the future:

The REDD+ programme will contribute to Fiji managing its forest resources sustainably and mitigate climate change. It will also protect and enhance the ecosystem services provided by forests, including the provision of clean water, wild edible plants, fertile soil and sources of livelihood.

— Viliame Naupoto, Fijian Permanent Secretary for Fisheries and Forests

=== International cooperation ===
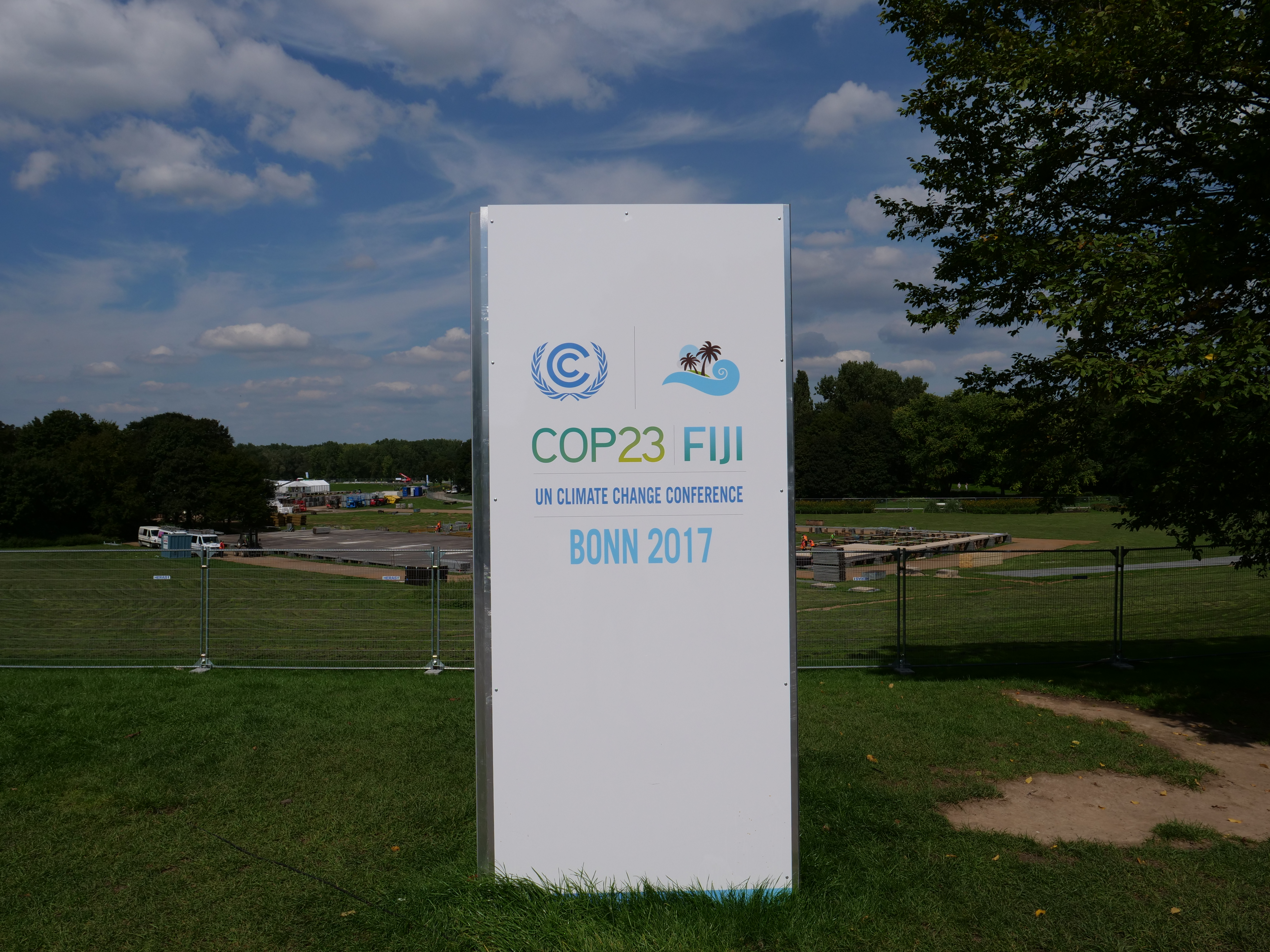
The 2017 United Nations Climate Change Conference was held in Bonn under Fiji's presidency.

Fiji became a signatory to the Kyoto Protocol on 17 September 1998 and the Paris Agreement on 22 April 2016. On the 5th of March 2019, Fiji submitted its long-term climate action plan to the UN Framework Convention on Climate Change - central to this is its aim to reach net-zero emissions across all sectors by 2050.

== See also ==
- Climate change in the Pacific Islands
