= New York Declaration on Forests =

The New York Declaration on Forests is a voluntary and non-legally binding political declaration which grew out of dialogue among governments, companies and civil society, spurred by the United Nations Secretary-General’s Climate Summit held in New York in 2014.

The Declaration pledges to halve the rate of deforestation by 2020, to end it by 2030, and to restore hundreds of millions of acres of degraded land. The proposed land restoration is described as covering "an area larger than India".

A voluntary Action Agenda accompanies the Declaration, providing "a guide to governments, companies, and organizations regarding the diverse set of actions that can achieve [the Declaration's] transformational goals".

A Washington-based consulting firm, Climate Advisers, wrote the draft of the Declaration. It has been signed by 37 governments, 20 sub-national governments, 53 multi-national companies, 16 groups representing indigenous communities and 63 non-government organizations. These included the EU member states, Canada, Japan, Kenya and Ethiopia.

The Declaration has been generally welcomed. The governments of Germany, Norway and the United Kingdom of Great Britain and Northern Ireland issued a joint statement strongly supporting the declaration, and committing their governments to "strengthening existing and creating new partnerships with forest countries designing green growth strategies, with leading private sector companies taking deforestation out of their supply chains, and with the financial sector, civil society and other donor governments to align incentives, transform markets and tip the balance against forest destruction", along with a financial commitment to fund up to 20 new programmes subject to robust, credible proposals being put forward by developing countries.

Some non-governmental organizations have also highlighted the limitations of the Declaration. In September 2019, the five-year assessment report "Progress on the New York Declaration on Forests Protecting and Restoring Forests - A Story of Large Commitments yet Limited Progress" was published.

== See also ==
- 2021 United Nations Climate Change Conference
