= Climate change in the Marshall Islands =

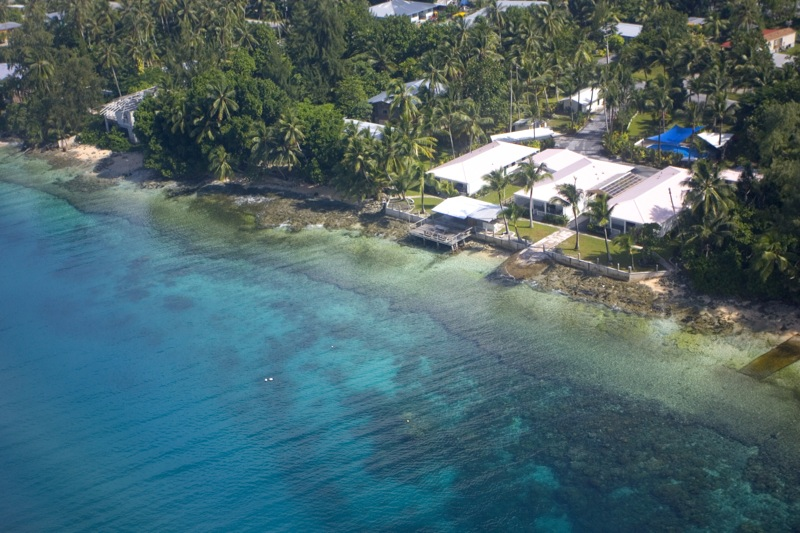
Image of Majuro, Marshall Islands

Climate change in the Marshall Islands is a major issue for the country. As with many countries made up of low-lying islands, the Marshall Islands is highly vulnerable to sea level rise and other impacts of climate change. The atoll and capital city of Majuro are particularly vulnerable, and the issue poses significant implications for the country's population. These threats have prompted Marshallese political leaders to make climate change a key diplomatic issue, who have responded with initiatives such as the Majuro Declaration.

The Human Rights Measurement Initiative finds that the climate crisis has worsened human rights conditions in the Marshall Islands greatly (5.0 out of 6). Human rights experts reported that the climate crisis has negatively impacted the economy, increased rates of unemployment, and lead to relocations to higher areas or migrations to other countries.

== Effects on the natural environment ==
The Marshall Islands is a collection of low-lying islands and atolls in the middle of the Pacific Ocean, all less than six feet in average elevation. Due to the geographic and topographic situation of these islands, they are placed in a position of intense risk in terms of exposure to the effects of climate change. Sea level rise has already encroached upon the islands, and high tides and frequent storms continue to threaten local homes and property. Recent research indicates that sea levels have been increasing by 3.4 millimetres (0.13 inches) per year. A one-meter rise could result in the loss of 80 percent of the Majuro Atoll, which is home to half the nation's population. The underwater fresh water supply has been salinated by this influx of seawater. In 2013 over 200 homes were damaged in the capital Majuro, and the airport was forced to close due to particularly high tides.

== Effects on people ==
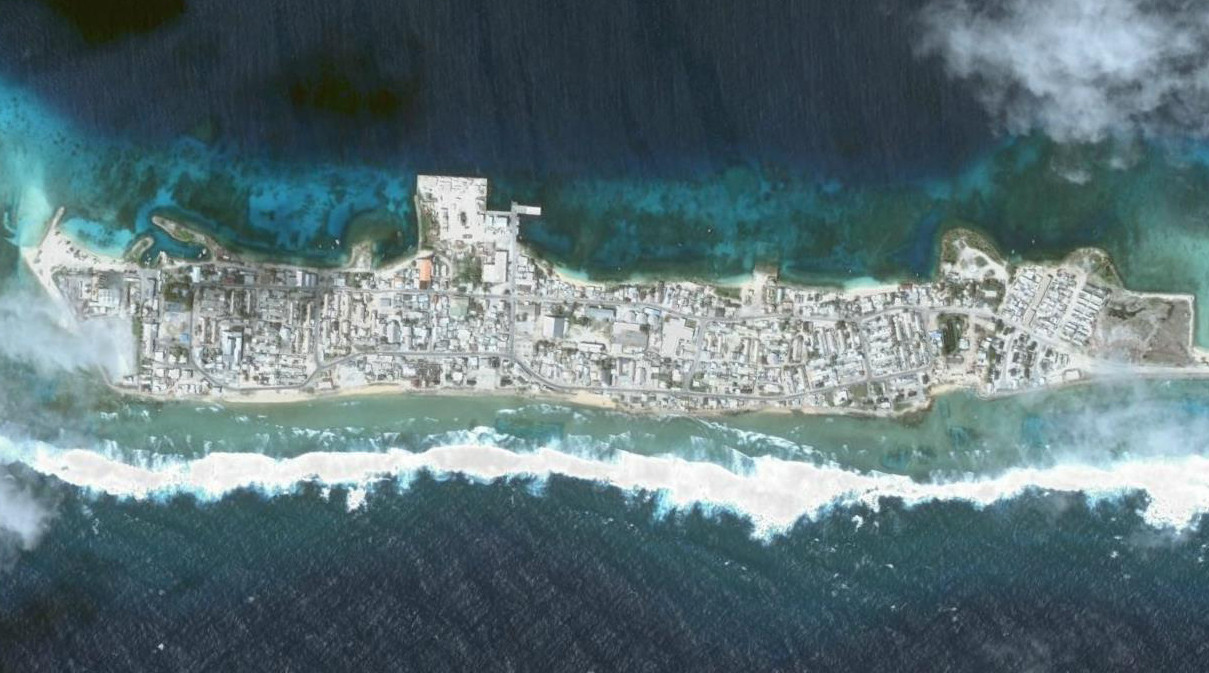
Satellite Image of Ebeye Island, Marshall Islands.

To a certain extent, the Marshallese are trapped on their islands, such as the Majuro Atoll, when large storms or tides occur, having no recourse to evacuate to higher grounds or neighbouring islands. The geographic isolation of the Marshall Islands renders any disaster caused by climate change especially destructive.

Particularly dangerous are king tides, exceptionally high tides, which occur only a few times a year. To preserve their land and fight off tides and storms, residents have resorted to building private sea walls for their immediate protection. A study by Murray Ford which compared aerial photographs of the Wotje Atoll of the Marshall Islands, found that "shorelines interpreted from high resolution satellite imagery captured between 2004 and 2012 indicate that shorelines within this sample of islands are largely in an erosive state".

Industries and livelihoods on the Marshall Islands are also threatened by climate change. Fisheries, particularly the tuna industry, are having to adapt to changing ecological inputs. The tourism industry of the Marshall Islands, only recently developed and has even more potential to grow, is seriously threatened by sea level rise and violent storms. Aversion to flying, due to greenhouse gas emissions may also have a role to play.

== Mitigation and adaptation ==
=== International cooperation ===
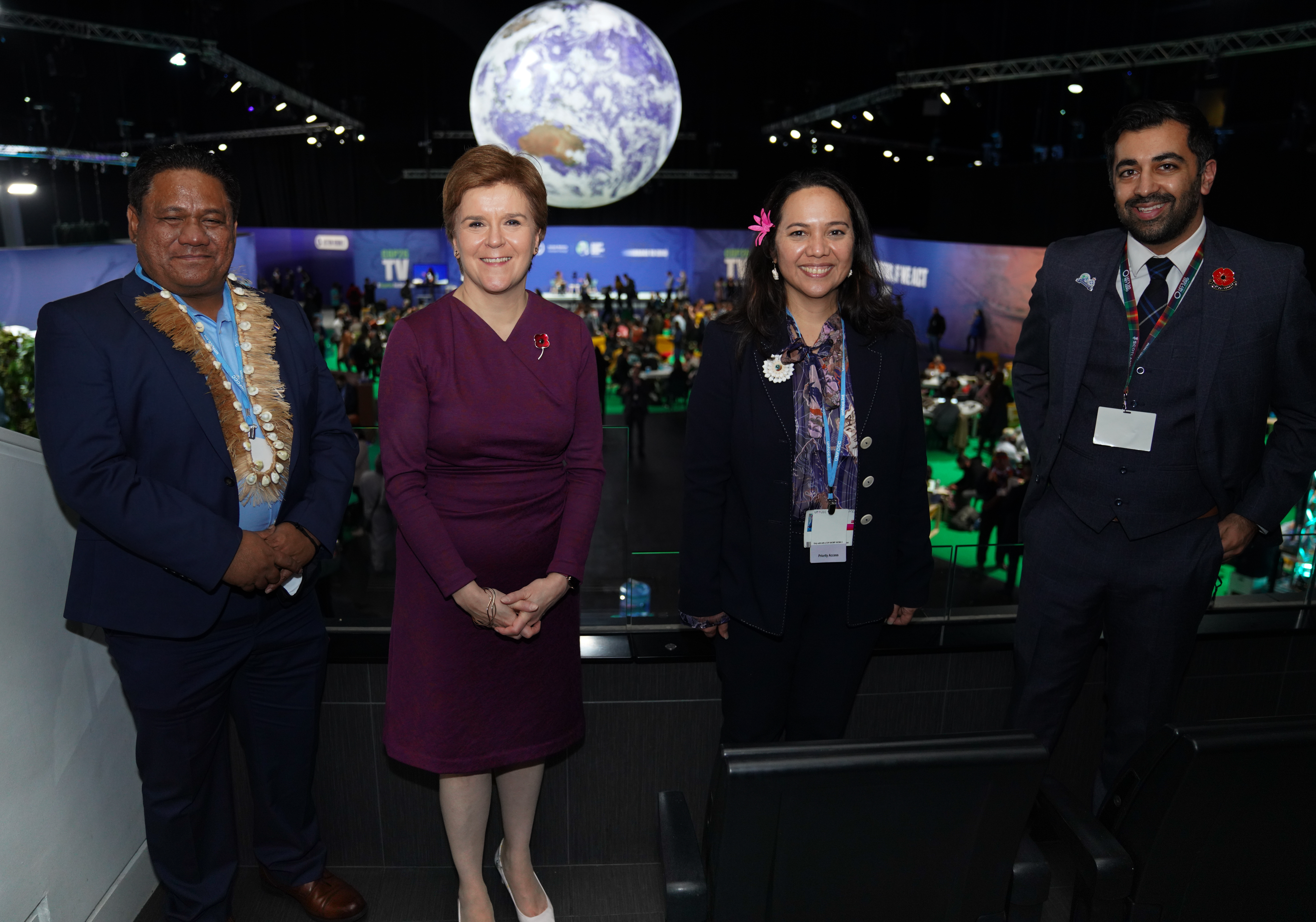
Marshallese Health Minister Bruce Bilimon and Climate Envoy Tina Stege with Scottish First Minister Nicola Sturgeon and Health Secretary Humza Yousaf at COP26.

In 2020 Marshall islands President David Kabua called for wealthy nations to pay for "loss and damage" to help ameliorate the effects of climate change on the Marshall Islands. The Marshall Islands have also called for a joint international effort to slow the rate of climate change, especially in regards to increasing sea levels. Following a drought in 2013, the US sent supplies to aid the Marshall Islands.

There is also a historical precedent for the United States to aid the Marshall Islands when it comes to natural climate change and catastrophe. After testing fifty-four nuclear bombs on the Bikini Atoll in the Marshall Islands during the 1940s and 1950s, the United States paid $604 million in reparations. These reparations helped to counteract the effects of nuclear fallout on the environment and the people of the Marshall Islands. Considering that the United States is the "largest aggregate polluter of carbon dioxide" in the world, there has been some outcry among the global community to "hold the United States liable" for the effects of increased emissions and climate change.

In addition, at the 44th Pacific Islands Forum summit held in 2013, the Marshall Islands proposed the "Majuro Declaration for Climate Leadership to galvanize more urgent and concrete action on climate change". As the president of the Marshall Islands noted, this declaration sought to "stave off the dangers of the ever-rising seas" by committing to "bold emissions reductions and renewable and energy efficiency targets". Challenges exist when it comes to communicating the effects of climate change in the Marshall Islands to the mainstream outside world and western media. Other problems also exist when it comes to transferring the western scientific notion of climate change to the people of the Marshall Islands.

A study by Peter Rudiak-Gould recognizes the need for "climate change communicators" to "carefully consider the transformations introduced by various translations of "climate change," yet also appreciate "mistranslation" for its ability to render concepts meaningful to local actors and to stimulate citizen–scientist dialogue". On a national governmental level, the Marshall Islands have been extremely proactive, especially for a developing nation, in attempting to arrest climate change. The Marshall Island pledged to decrease emission levels for 2025 by 32% from 2010 levels, and by 2050 to have a net total of zero emissions. While announcing these targets, the President of the Marshall Islands, Christopher Loeak noted that "going low carbon is in everyone's interests. It improves our economy, our security, our health and our prosperity, particularly in the Pacific and more broadly in the developing world." Global emission rates, will be predominantly determined by the largest emission producers, which include the United States and China.

Former President of the Republic of the Marshall Islands, Christopher Loeak said in 2014, "In the last year alone, my country has suffered through unprecedented droughts in the north, and the biggest ever king tide in the south; we have watched the most devastating typhoons in history leave a trail of death and destruction across the region."

=== Migration ===
Among the many efforts to protect the culture of the Marshall Islands is an effort to buy land and relocate the people to other locations. Currently several of the biggest relocation sites outside of the Marshall Islands are Hawaii, Washington state, and Springdale, Arkansas, where over 10,000 Marshall Islanders currently live. The Marshall Islanders living outside of the United States participate in Marshallese culture, including voting in national elections by mail.

However, the Marshallese who have resettled in Arkansas have encountered many cultural difficulties and differences between the Marshall Islands and Arkansas. Several examples include the different types of available food, the geographic setting, and cultural institutions. As a result of sea level rise, one of the largest issues facing the Marshall Islands is how to preserve cultural and historical traditions if the Marshallese are forced to adapt to a new, totally different area, potentially far away.

== See also ==
- Effects of climate change on small island countries
- Pacific Islands Forum
- Dear Matafele Peinem
