= Dear Matafele Peinem =

"Dear Matafele Peinam" is a poem by the Marshallese poet Kathy Jetn̄il-Kijiner. Written in English, the poem is a letter to her then seven month old daughter, Matafele Peinam. The poem is most notable for its having been read aloud by Jetn̄il-Kijiner at the opening ceremony of the 2014 UN Climate Summit, held at the United Nations headquarters in New York in September 2014; it received a standing ovation from the gathered delegates which lasted over one minute.

The poem's content primarily deals with the global climate crisis which, via rising sea levels, threatens to inundate the Marshall Islands. In the poem, Jetn̄il-Kijiner promises that she will protect her daughter from the crisis, and assures her, and her descendants, the ability to live in the Marshall Islands. The poem, however, also recognizes the failure to avoid the relocation of the Carteret Islanders, and promises that "We are drawing the line now"

Commenting on the poem in his retrospective documentary The Last Years of Majuro, in regards to the predicted inundation of the Marshall Islands due to climate change, Sam Denby said, "In stories, the underdog is supposed to win. When they give it their all, [...] when they read 'Dear Matafele Peinam', when they chant 1.5 to stay alive, (Note: A common climate change slogan in the Marshall Islands. See Shapiro, Ari (9 December 2015). "For The Marshall Islands, The Climate Goal Is '1.5 To Stay Alive'". NPR. All Things Considered. Archived from the original on 9 December 2015.) it’s supposed to work. Today, projections show that under the best case scenario, we’ll reach 1.5 in 2052."
