= 2014 UN Climate Summit =

Climate change conference in 2014

- Date: 23 September 2014
- Location: New York City, New York, United States
- Organized by: UN
- Participants: UN member countries

The Climate Summit 2014 (sometimes also referred to as the Leader's Climate Summit) was a meeting on climate change in New York on September 23, 2014. UN Secretary-General Ban Ki-moon announced it in September 2013 and invited leaders of governments, the private sector, and civil society to unite in taking concrete action towards a low-carbon emission world.

The Climate Summit 2014's focus was on initiatives and actions rather than on negotiations between countries. It was seen as a milestone towards closing the emissions gap between reduction pledges and the necessary emission cuts for the 2 °C scenario (with "pursue efforts to" limit the temperature increase to 1.5 °C). It was also seen as a key step towards a new legal agreement on climate change, the Paris Agreement, which was adopted by the COP21 in Paris in December 2015 and became effective in November 2016. Another direct product of the Climate Summit 2014 was the New York Declaration on Forests.

== Developments and positions prior to the Summit ==
After the COP19 in Warsaw, the Climate Summit was the next high-level gathering on climate change. Since the Kyoto Protocol's second commitment period expired in 2020, the UNFCCC process attempts to establish a new worldwide contract about climate protection and emission reduction objectives, drafted in 2014 at the COP20 in Lima and adopted in 2015 at the COP21 in Paris. The Climate Summit in September 2014 was not part of this negotiating process, but served as a kick-off for a year of intense activity in climate policy and an indicator on the countries' ambitions to reduce emissions and support climate protection. Having this in mind, UN Secretary-General Ban invited leaders of governments, the private sector and civil society from all over the world to unite in action:

I challenge you to bring to the Summit bold pledges. Innovate, scale-up, cooperate and deliver concrete action that will close the emissions gap and put us on track for an ambitious legal agreement through the UNFCCC process.

— UN Secretary-General Ban Ki-moon

In December 2013, Secretary-General Ban appointed the former President of Ghana, John Kufuor, and Jens Stoltenberg, former Prime Minister of Norway, as special envoys on climate change, to assist Ban in connection with the Climate Summit and provide strategic advice.

In preparation for the Climate Summit, on May 4 and 5 the Abu Dhabi Ascent was held in Abu Dhabi, UAE, as a meeting in order to cross-link initiatives between governments, the private sector and civil society and to "generate momentum" for the Climate Summit.

In July 2014, Ban Ki-moon appointed former President of Ireland, and former United Nations High Commissioner for Human Rights, Mary Robinson, a special envoy for climate change to interact with global leaders ahead of the Climate Summit, to forge political commitment towards finalizing an agreement in 2015.

== Location and participation ==
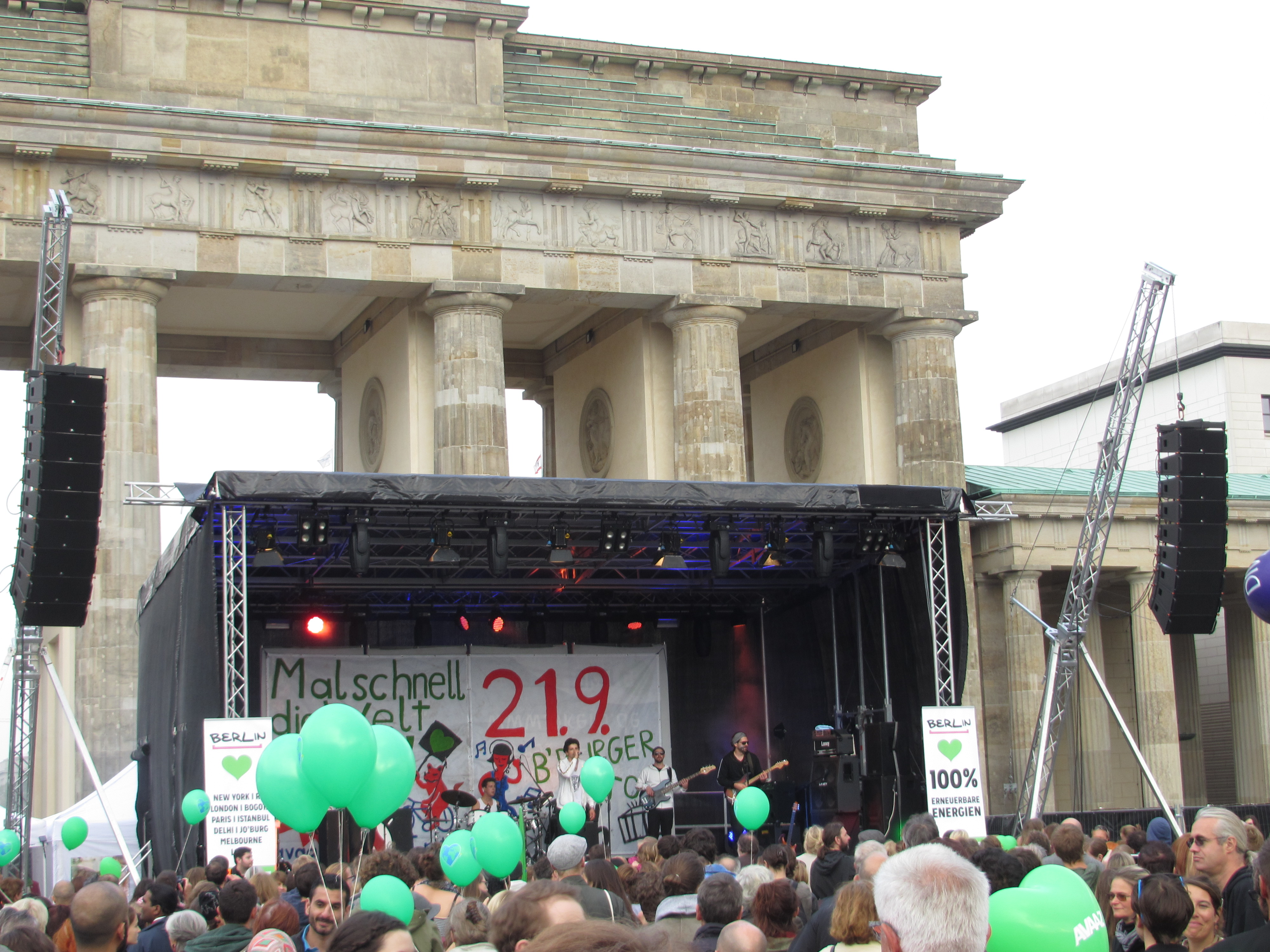
mal-schnell-die-welt-retten, Climate March in Berlin (21 September 2014)

The Climate Summit took place at UN Headquarters in New York City on September 23, 2014, one day ahead of the annual General Assembly Debate. Corporations of the Fossil fuel industry and other vested interests and their lobbying arms, such as the Global Climate Coalition (GCC), sent large delegations to the Summit to participate in the discussions, as they have in every major international climate conference for decades. The participation of such vested interests was rarely reported by network news or other major news outlets. This industry-funded GCC undertook to undermine established climate science data, to highlight uncertainties, and accordingly, to advocate for inaction by the public and governments.

A major protest against climate change took place outside the conference and on Sunday two days before the conference in other countries worldwide to encourage the leaders to take strong climate action.

== See also ==
- 2015 United Nations Climate Change Conference, COP21
- Paris Agreement, 2016
- Global Climate Action Summit, 2018
- 2019 UN Climate Action Summit
- "Dear Matafele Peinem"
