= Kiribati Adaptation Program =

The Kiribati Adaptation Program (KAP) is a US$5.5 million initiative that was originally enacted by the national government of Kiribati with the support of the Global Environment Facility (GEF), the World Bank, the United Nations Development Program, and the Japanese Government. Australia later joined the coalition, donating US$1.5 million to the effort. The program aims to take place over 6 years, supporting measures that reduce Kiribati's vulnerability to the effects of climate change and sea level rise by raising awareness of climate change, assessing and protecting available water resources, and managing inundation. At the start of the Adaptation Program, representatives from each of the inhabited atolls identified key climatic changes that had taken place over the past 20–40 years, and proposed coping mechanisms to deal with these changes under 4 categories of urgency of need. The program is now focusing on the country's most vulnerable sectors in the most highly populated areas. Initiatives include improving water supply management in and around Tarawa; coastal management protection measures such as mangrove re-plantation and protection of public infrastructure; strengthening laws to reduce coastal erosion; and population settlement planning to reduce personal risks.

== Three phases ==
The Kiribati Adaptation Program (KAP) is being implemented in three phases:

- Phase I: Preparation (2003–2005, completed). This phase began the process of mainstreaming adaptation into national economic planning and identified priority pilot investments for Phase II. It also involved an extensive process of national consultation and was closely linked with the preparation of the 2004-07 National Development Strategy and Ministry Operational Plans, and the compilation of the National Adaptation Program of Action (NAPA) which was completed in early 2007.
- Phase II: Pilot Implementation (2006–2010). The objective of this current phase is to develop and demonstrate the systematic diagnosis of climate-related problems and the design and implementation of cost-effective adaptation measures, while continuing the integration of climate risk awareness and responsiveness into economic and operational planning.
- Phase III: Expansion (2010–2015). Many lessons are being learned in the current Phase II and these are informing the design and preparation of an expanded programme for Climate Change Adaptation (CCA) which will incorporate Disaster Risk Reduction (DRR) measures which, in Kiribati in particular, are closely linked to climate change adaptation initiatives.

The World Bank has praised The Government of the Republic of Kiribati for being "a global leader in laying the groundwork for dealing with the threat from natural hazards since the mid-1990s", although the original cause of the escalation of these "hazards" in recent times is anthropogenic climate change, rather than naturally occurring climatic events.

== Beyond 2010 ==
The Government of Kiribati intends that the follow on project will focus on two priority areas: water resource management and coastal resilience. These are the two top priorities identified in the NAPA as well as the focus of ongoing KAPII pilot programs implemented in conjunction with government ministries. A scaling up of successful pilot projects would support the overarching goal of mainstreaming adaptation to climate change and disaster risk reduction into core aspects of Kiribati economic and social development.

All external KAP reports will be made available on the Government of Kiribati's climate change portal.

== See also ==
- Kiribati
- Ambo Declaration
- Tarawa Climate Change Conference
