= Alliance of Small Island States =

Intergovernmental organization

- Abbreviation: AOSIS
- Established: 1990
- Type: Intergovernmental organization
- Headquarters: New York City, U.S.
- Members: 39 members: Antigua and Barbuda; Bahamas; Barbados; Belize; Cabo Verde; Comoros; Cook Islands; Cuba; Dominica; Dominican Republic; Fiji; Grenada; Guinea Bissau; Guyana; Haiti; Jamaica; Kiribati; Maldives; Marshall Islands; Mauritius; Micronesia; Nauru; Niue; Palau; Papua New Guinea; Saint Kitts and Nevis; Saint Lucia; Saint Vincent and the Grenadines; Samoa; Sao Tome and Principe; Seychelles; Singapore; Solomon Islands; Suriname; Timor Leste; Tonga; Trinidad and Tobago; Tuvalu; Vanuatu
- Chair: HE Ilana V. Seid
- Website: aosis.org

Alliance of Small Island States (AOSIS) is an intergovernmental organization of low-lying coastal and small island countries. AOSIS was established in 1990, ahead of the Second World Climate Conference. The main purpose of the alliance is to consolidate the voices of Small Island Developing States (SIDS) to address global warming.

These island countries are particularly vulnerable to climate change and its related effects on the ocean, including sea level rise, coastal erosion and saltwater intrusion. The members are among the nations least responsible for climate change, having contributed less than 1% to the world's greenhouse gas emissions. These states advocate for international policy and mechanisms for addressing the inequity of climate impacts.

== Organization ==
AOSIS is recognized as the negotiating voice for SIDS through the United Nations (UN) system. Its highest decision making body is the biannual meeting of the Heads of State and Government of Member States, which sets policy direction and adopts regular Declarations and Communiques. The Plenary of Permanent Representatives to the United Nations takes decisions, which are implemented through a Secretariat hosted at the Permanent Mission of the Chair.

== Mission ==
AOSIS' core focus areas are climate change, sustainable development and ocean conservation.

SIDS are among the nations least responsible for climate change, having contributed less than 1% to the world's greenhouse gas emissions. They are particularly vulnerable to its effects, with some islands at risk of becoming uninhabitable due to sea level rise. AOSIS has consistently raised this threat of uninhabitability created by climate change in climate negotiations.

SIDS, of which AOSIS is predominantly comprised, account for less than 1% of the global GDP, territory, and population, meaning that individually SIDS hold little political weight in international climate negotiations. The aim of AOSIS is to amplify the voices of its members by joining together states which face similar issues. This is to increase their ability to influence climate negotiations and raise awareness for its concerns.

== Actions ==
AOSIS has been very active from its inception. It has played a leading role in the global arena in raising awareness on climate change and advocating for action to address climate change. The creation of the alliance marked the beginning of the growth in influence of SIDS in climate politics. Despite their size and their relatively small economic and political weight, AOSIS member states have pulled above their weight in climate change negotiations.

AOSIS played an important role in establishing the United Nations Framework Convention on Climate Change (UNFCCC) and was an important actor in the negotiations of the Framework in 1992. Its advocacy was instrumental to the inclusion of references to the greater vulnerability and special needs of SIDS in Article 4.8 of the UNFCCC. However, AOSIS was unsuccessful in its attempts to persuade nations to include commitments to specified greenhouse gas emission reduction targets in the Framework.

AOSIS continued to advocate for the special needs of SIDS during the Earth Summit in Rio de Janeiro in 1992 and the 'special case' of SIDS was recognised in Agenda 21, the political action plan which resulted from the Summit. AOSIS' proposal to create an 'international insurance fund', funded by developed countries to compensate SIDS for damage caused by climate change, was turned down. In Rio, AOSIS broadened its mandate beyond climate change to also include the sustainable development of SIDS. AOSIS negotiated for the inclusion of a small program area on the sustainable development of small islands in Agenda 21. Agenda 21 was not legally binding, and some academics contend that the program was too vague to promote meaningful action.

AOSIS did manage to secure the inclusion in Agenda 21 of a call for a global conference on this issue, which led to the first Global Conference on the Sustainable Development of Small Island States, held in Barbados in 1994. AOSIS played a prominent role at the Conference. It was the first UN conference entirely devoted to SIDS. The Conference resulted in the translation of Agenda 21 into a more comprehensive programme, the Barbados Programme of Action on the Sustainable Development of Small Island Developing States. The five year review of the Barbados Conference, conducted at a special session of the UN General Assembly in 1999, found that the SIDS efforts to make progress towards sustainable development had been limited, while the ten year review of the Barbados Conference, which took the form of an international meeting in Mauritius in 2005, found that its implementation was largely unsuccessful.

AOSIS put forward the first draft text in the Kyoto Protocol negotiations as early as 1994. AOSIS member states Fiji and Antigua and Barbuda were the first states to ratify the Kyoto Protocol in 1998.

AOSIS has used formal and informal meetings scheduled in advance of UN climate change conferences to raise awareness and political momentum for its mission. AOSIS has also used the media to raise awareness for its concerns. For example, in the lead up to the 2009 UN Climate Change Conference (UNFCCC) in Copenhagen, members of the cabinet of the Maldives, an AOSIS member state, held an underwater cabinet meeting to create awareness of the threat that climate change poses to the very existence of the Maldives. The stunt garnered international attention.

At the UN Climate Change Conference in Berlin in 1995, AOSIS advocated very strongly for a commitment to timetables and target measures for climate change. It gained the support of developed nations including China, Brazil, and India. AOSIS had advocated since 2008 for the inclusion of a temperature target to restrain global warming to 1.5 °C above pre-industrial levels. Many of the AOSIS member states were present at the Conference in Copenhagen. Democracy Now! reported that members from the island state of Tuvalu interrupted a session of the Conference on 10 December 2009 to demand that global temperature rise be limited to 1.5 °C instead of the proposed 2 °C. This advocacy continued in the lead up to the 2015 UNFCCC in Paris. AOSIS initiated the negotiating agenda item which would lead to the inclusion of the 1.5 °C target and was important in gaining support for its inclusion from vulnerable African and Asian countries and LDC countries. According to writer and activist Mark Lynas, the inclusion of the 1.5 °C target in the Paris Agreement was 'almost entirely' due to the advocacy of SIDS and other developing countries.

At the 2013 Warsaw climate change conference, AOSIS pushed for the establishment of an international mechanism on loss and damages stressed by the wreckage of Supertyphoon Haiyan. As the existence of many AOSIS member states are put at risk by climate change, AOSIS has threatened lawsuits. The results of a recent review of the literature show that potential liability for climate change-related losses for AOSIS is over $570 trillion. AOSIS raised this issue again at the 2015 UNFCCC in Paris. AOSIS was instrumental in the inclusion of Article 8 in the Paris Agreement, which 'recognizes the importance of averting, minimizing and addressing loss and damage' caused by climate change, although the article does not 'provide a basis for any liability of compensation'. As in previous climate agreements, AOSIS members were among the first to ratify the Paris Agreement, with Fiji ratifying first, followed days later by the Republic of Marshall Islands, Palau, the Maldives, and others.

AOSIS member state Fiji co-hosted the UN Oceans Conference in 2017. Ministers from AOSIS member states, including Fiji, Tuvalu, and Palau used this conference to again raise awareness of the real risk that the impact of climate change poses to the very existence of their nations and to advocate for action to address climate change. Fiji also presided over the 2017 UN Climate Change Conference, making it the first SIDS to preside over a UN conference on climate change, although the event took place in Bonn due to Fiji's remote location, small size and limited infrastructure.

Agreement was reached suddenly at the 2023 United Nations Climate Change Conference (COP28) on the final day. Anna Rasmussen who was the chief negotiator for AOSIS was shocked to find that the decision had been made while the AOSIS delegation was not present.

== AOSIS membership ==
AOSIS has a membership of 39 global states, of which 37 are members of the UN while 2 (Cook Islands and Niue) participate within UN agencies. The alliance represents 28% of the developing countries, and 20% of the UN's total membership.

AOSIS has a heterogeneous membership with member states spread across many different global regions. While AOSIS' focus is on SIDS, its membership also includes several low-lying coastal countries, for example Belize and Guyana, and larger islands, for example Papua New Guinea. Member nations also vary economically, with AOSIS including both wealthy nations, such as Singapore, as well as least developed countries (LDCs), such as Haiti. Some scholars contend that AOSIS' heterogeneity has weakened its effectiveness, particularly in regard to its lobbying for sustainable development.

The common factor which unites AOSIS members is their particular vulnerability to climate change.

== Member states ==
The member states are:

In the Caribbean (16 countries):

- Antigua and Barbuda
- Bahamas
- Barbados
- Belize
- Cuba
- Dominica
- Dominican Republic
- Grenada
- Guyana
- Haiti
- Jamaica
- Saint Kitts and Nevis
- Saint Lucia
- Saint Vincent and the Grenadines
- Suriname
- Trinidad and Tobago

In the Atlantic Indian Oceans and the South China Sea (9 countries):

- Cabo Verde
- Comoros
- Guinea-Bissau
- Maldives
- Mauritius
- São Tomé and Príncipe
- Seychelles
- Singapore
- Timor-Leste

In the Pacific Ocean (14 countries):

- Cook Islands
- Fiji
- Kiribati
- Marshall Islands
- Federated States of Micronesia
- Nauru
- Niue
- Palau
- Papua New Guinea
- Samoa
- Solomon Islands
- Tonga
- Tuvalu
- Vanuatu

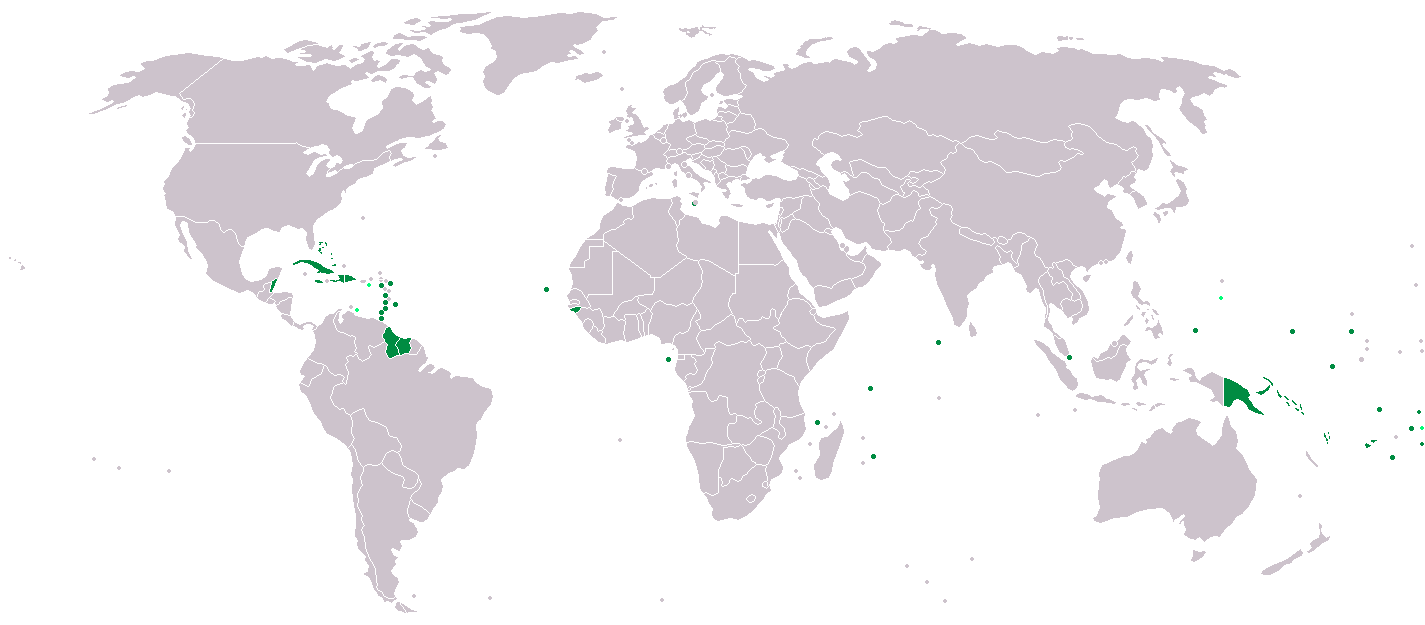
AOSIS members in dark green (as of March 2025).

== Chairmanship ==
There have been 15 chairs of AOSIS since its establishment, with the Permanent Representative of Palau, Ambassador Ilana V. Seid, as the current chair.

Term	Duration	Name	Country
1	1991 – 1994	Robert Van Lierop	Vanuatu
2	1994 – 1997	Annette des Iles	Trinidad and Tobago
3	1997 – 2002	Tuiloma Neroni Slade	Samoa
4	2002 – 2005	Jagdish Koonjul	Mauritius
5	2005 – 2006	Enele Sopoaga (acting)	Tuvalu
6	2006	Julian R. Hunte	Saint Lucia
7	2006 – 2009	Angus Friday	Grenada
8	2009 – 2011	Dessima Williams	Grenada
9	2012 – 2014	Marlene Moses	Nauru
10	2015 – 2017	Ahmed Sareer	Maldives
11	2017 – 2018	Ali Naseer Mohamed	Maldives
12	2019 – 2020	Lois Michele Young	Belize
13	2021 – 2022	Walton Alfonso Webson	Antigua and Barbuda
14	2023 – 2024	Pa’olelei Luteru	Samoa
15	2025 – present	Ilana V. Seid	Palau

== Honours ==
In 2010, AOSIS was awarded the first Frederick R. Anderson Award for Outstanding Achievement in Addressing Climate Change by the Center for International Environmental Law.

In 2022, the Italy-AOSIS Fellowship Programme, an AOSIS-led initiative to train early career diplomats from AOSIS countries received the inaugural UN SIDS Partnership Award in the Social Category.

== See also ==
- Africa, the Caribbean and the Pacific (ACP)
- Barbados Programme of Action (BPOA)
- Climate change mitigation
- Islands First
- Least Developed Countries (LDC)
- World Ocean Conference
- Politics of global warming
