= Independent Diplomat =

- Formation: 2004
- Founder: Carne Ross
- Type: Non-profit, non-governmental organisation
- Purpose: To support those in conflict and crisis to access and influence international decision-making and processes that matter to them. ID does this by providing committed high impact diplomatic support, advice and training.
- Headquarters: New York, United States
- Leader: Reza Afshar OBE
- Website: Official website

Independent Diplomat is a non-profit non-governmental organisation founded in 2004 by British former diplomat Carne Ross and currently led by Reza Afshar OBE. It is a non-profit diplomatic advisory group that strives to create more inclusive, just, effective and lasting peace processes and international agreements by partnering with marginalized groups and democratic governments to support the increase of their diplomatic advice skills and capacity.

== History ==
Independent Diplomat's philosophy is informed by Carne Ross' experience at the United Nations Security Council, most notably the "very obvious imbalance [...] between the diplomatic resources and skills of the powerful countries, and everyone else. In his book Independent Diplomat, Dispatches from an Unaccountable Elite (2007), Ross argued that the "numerous smaller UN missions struggle to cover the enormous and proliferating agendas of the UN General Assembly, Security Council and specialised committees with just one or two horribly overworked and under-equipped diplomats."

== Work ==
Independent Diplomat is based in New York. Its staff includes former diplomats from various counties. In 2022, its annual budget was $3 million; revenue came from foundation grants, government grants, earned income and individual donations.

The group is a nonprofit providing diplomatic advisory services, sometimes called "freelance diplomacy." Carne Ross, the group founder, has argued for broader participation of small countries in United Nations institutions.

The organization works on several diplomatic initiatives, including supporting the Republic of the Marshall Islands in international climate negotiations where they lead the High Ambition Coalition, achieving outcomes such as the 1.5°C temperature goal in the Paris Agreement and commitments to double adaptation finance from developed to developing nations. Independent Diplomat advises various groups seeking conflict resolution and peace processes:

In Mali, ID has worked with the Coordination of Azawad Movements (CMA) to facilitate initial disarmament phases and promote women's inclusion in the peace process. Following the dissolution of MINUSMA in 2023, ID continues to support CMA's international engagement. In Yemen, ID provides diplomatic advice to the Southern Transitional Council (STC) and several Yemeni women's groups, working to ensure Southern Yemeni representation in peace negotiations. The organization supports Rohingya representatives in pursuing justice and accountability following the Rohingya genocide, as well as establishing conditions for repatriation to Myanmar. In Western Sahara, ID works with the Polisario Front on their objective of securing self-determination for the indigenous Sahrawi people.

The organization also works on systemic diplomatic initiatives, including:

- Supporting refugee-led organizations (RLOs) to secure formal refugee representation in international refugee policy negotiations.
- Advancing women's political participation in peace negotiations and diplomatic processes across multiple regions.
- Providing diplomatic support to Small Island Developing States in the Pacific on cybersecurity and digital governance issues.

Ross, the group's founder, says that the organization declines to provide services to clients who "are engaged in armed conflicts, are insufficiently committed to human rights, democracy and international law, or unwilling to commit to negotiated settlements to their problems." Ross told the Associated Press: "We advise would-be countries, but also regular states where we can add our own expertise to theirs, as long as they are democratic countries that respect international law."
