= Tina Stege =

Marshall Islands climate envoy

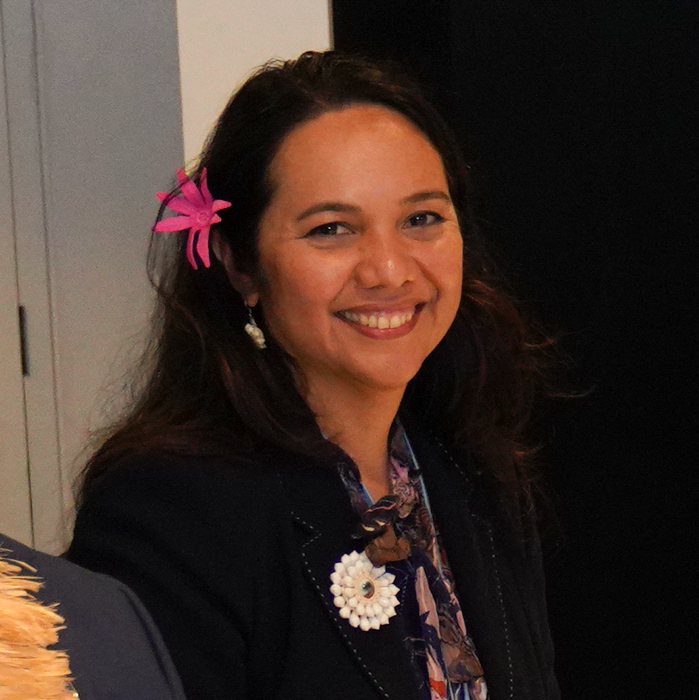
- in 2021
- Born: c.1977 Saipan

Tina Stege is the Climate Envoy for the Marshall Islands (RMI). The RMI is one of the countries in the world most vulnerable to climate change, mainly as a result of rising sea levels. Stege has represented her country at the 2019 United Nations Climate Change Conference (COP25) held in Madrid, Spain, the 2021 Conference (COP26) held in Glasgow, Scotland, the 2022 Conference (COP27) held in Sharm El Sheikh, Egypt, the 2023 Conference (COP28), held in Dubai, and the 2024 Conference (COP29), held in Baku, Azerbaijan. She has also been a spokesperson for the RMI on the impacts of nuclear testing.

== Early life ==
Kristina Eonemto Stege was born in about 1977 in Saipan on the Northern Mariana Islands and raised on Kwajalein Atoll and in Majuro in the Marshall Islands. She went to school in Honolulu. Stege received an undergraduate degree in 1997 from Princeton University in New Jersey, US, and a master's in anthropology from Aix-Marseille University in France in 2006.

== Career ==
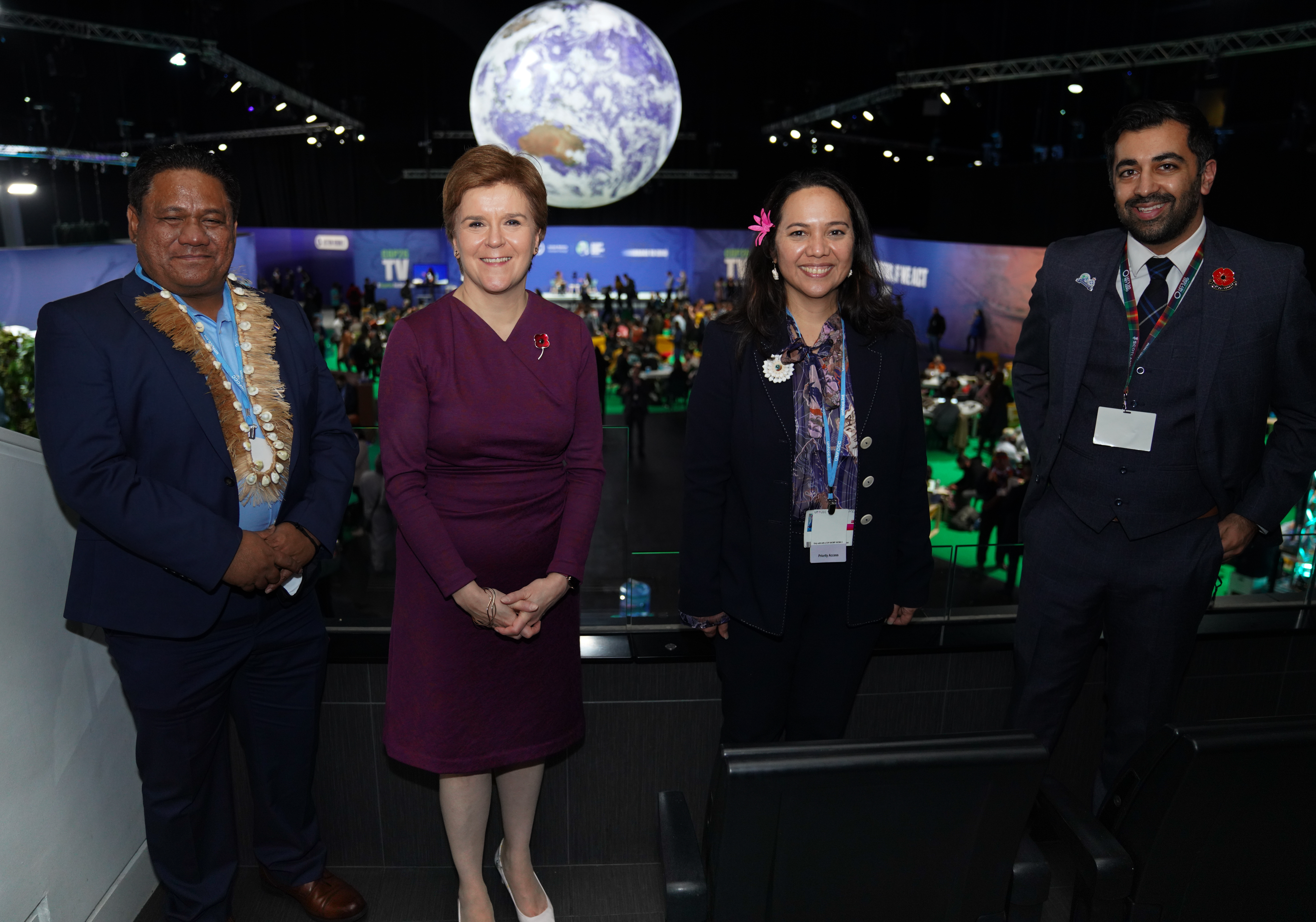
Bruce Bilimon Health Minister of the Marshall Islands, Nicola Sturgeon Scottish First Minister, Stege and the Scottish Health Secretary meeting during COP26

Stege began her career in 1998 in the RMI Ministry of Foreign Affairs. She then transferred to the Marshall Islands embassy in Washington, D.C., where she worked for almost seven years, being responsible for liaison with the United States Congress. Returning home, in 2007 she was a researcher on a Land and Women project of the Pacific Islands Forum. In 2010 she worked for the United States government on matters relating to emigration to the US. She also carried out various consultancies, including for the Asian Development Bank and Greenpeace Aotearoa New Zealand, in the latter case working on the unresolved legacy of U.S. nuclear testing in the Marshall Islands. She has also worked closely with the Marshallese Education Initiative, an organization based in northwest Arkansas, US, where more than 12,000 Marshallese live.

In September 2015, Stege addressed the United Nations at its commemoration of the International Day for the Total Elimination of Nuclear Weapons, stressing that the people of the Marshall Islands know what it is to be living in a nuclear world, having been subjected to US tests, which were having a continued impact. In 2018 she was appointed as Climate Envoy of the RMI, and is based in New York. In this capacity she attended the 2019, 2021, 2022, 2023, and 2024 United Nations Climate Change Conferences (COP25, 26, 27, 28 and 29). Her country is in danger from rising sea levels with the existence of the nation of the Marshall Islands under threat. Two fifths of the buildings in the capital will be flooded and several of the Marshall Islands will disappear as predicted by a World Bank report. The impact of climate change is already being felt in her country. An airport runway was flooded by the sea and there has been an outbreak of dengue fever, attributed to higher temperatures.

Stege is chair of the High Ambition Coalition which links richer nations with smaller, poorer nations to discuss the impact of the former's climate activity on the latter. The High Ambition Group had been formed to address Tony deBrum, the former and late Marshall Islands Foreign Minister's, challenge to limit global warming to 1.5 degrees during the Paris Agreement talks. Stege is also deBrum's niece. During COP26, she appeared on The Andrew Marr Show. Marr asked her about the dangers that the Marshall Islands was facing and Stege noted the droughts they had experienced and the plans to raise the level of islands using funds that had been promised by other countries.

At the end of COP28 Stege was slightly late on the last day. By the time she and her minister had entered the room the final vote had been taken. Anna Rasmussen who was the Alliance of Small Island States (AOSIS)'s chief negotiator was in shock that a decision had been made when they were not there. At COP29 she was among a group of AOSIS (Alliance of Small Island States) and LDCs (Least Developed Countries) who temporarily walked out of the meeting in protest at the lack of consultation of larger countries with them, particularly on the issue of Climate finance.
