= Freelance diplomacy =

Proposed type of diplomacy

Freelance diplomacy is a form of self-financing diplomatic representation used by countries who, as a general rule, cannot afford to hire expert diplomatic consultants full-time.

A "freelance diplomat" is hired for a specific task or may sometimes be contracted on a permanent basis to run a delegation, mission or embassy. They may also be used to promote investment into the country they work for. It is understood to be a performance-based relationship, where the diplomat is paid on results only.

Prominent freelance diplomats include.

- Carne Ross, former British diplomat.
- Jimmy Carter, former President of the United States.
