= World Heritage Strategy for Small Island Developing States =

Strategy adopted by the World Heritage Committee

The World Heritage Strategy for Small Island Developing States is a strategy adopted by the World Heritage Committee in 2026 to strengthen the participation and capacity of Small Island Developing States (SIDS) in the World Heritage Convention system. The strategy covers the period 2026–2034 and addresses the conservation and management of cultural and natural heritage in SIDS, with particular attention to climate change, natural disasters, limited technical capacity and financial constraints.

The strategy was developed by UNESCO through a consultation process involving the 39 SIDS that are States Parties to the World Heritage Convention, as well as international experts, UNESCO Advisory Bodies and other partners. It was endorsed by the World Heritage Committee at its 48th session in Busan, South Korea, in July 2026.

== Background ==
Small Island Developing States are a group of developing countries and territories located primarily in the Caribbean Sea, Atlantic Ocean, Indian Ocean and Pacific Ocean. UNESCO recognizes 39 SIDS among its Member States, in addition to associate members.

SIDS face a number of particular challenges in the protection of cultural and natural heritage. These include exposure to climate change, extreme weather events and natural disasters, as well as limited financial and technical resources for conservation and heritage management. UNESCO established a dedicated World Heritage Programme for SIDS in 2005 following a decision of the World Heritage Committee at its 29th session.

The development of a dedicated strategy was preceded by regional action plans and UNESCO's broader Operational Strategy for SIDS for 2023–2029.

== Development ==
The World Heritage Centre began developing a dedicated strategy and prioritization framework for SIDS in response to the challenges facing their heritage and the need to integrate climate resilience and sustainable development into heritage policies.

The consultation process involved representatives of SIDS States Parties, national focal points, World Heritage site managers, experts, regional organizations, universities, UNESCO Category 2 Centres and the World Heritage Convention's Advisory Bodies.

A global consultation was held in Kingston, Jamaica, in October 2025 to discuss the draft strategy. A subsequent validation consultation took place online in April 2026, involving representatives of 20 SIDS States Parties and other stakeholders.

The draft strategy, including its strategic objectives, priority actions, expected outcomes and costed action plan, was submitted to the World Heritage Committee for consideration at its 48th session in 2026.

== Adoption ==
The World Heritage Committee endorsed the World Heritage Strategy for SIDS at its 48th session in July 2026. The Committee also requested the World Heritage Centre to establish a dedicated sub-account of the World Heritage Fund for implementation of the strategy and encouraged States Parties, international organizations, development partners, foundations, the private sector and other donors to provide financial or in-kind contributions.

The strategy has a budget of approximately US$13 million.

== Objectives ==
The strategy is organized around four strategic objectives:

1. strengthening environmental and climate resilience;
2. preserving and enhancing human, technical and financial capacities;
3. improving heritage governance and management; and
4. fostering the engagement of local communities.

The strategy also seeks to integrate World Heritage protection into climate adaptation policies and to strengthen national capacities for the identification, conservation and management of heritage properties.

== Implementation ==
Implementation is intended to support SIDS in identifying potential World Heritage properties, preparing nominations, improving conservation and management practices, and strengthening national heritage institutions.

The strategy places particular emphasis on cooperation between SIDS and on the exchange of knowledge, experience and good practices. It also seeks to improve resource mobilization and international cooperation for heritage conservation.

The World Heritage Committee requested the World Heritage Centre to report on implementation of the strategy, including related financial information, at its 50th session.

== See also ==
- Small Island Developing States
