= Territorial loss due to rising sea-level =

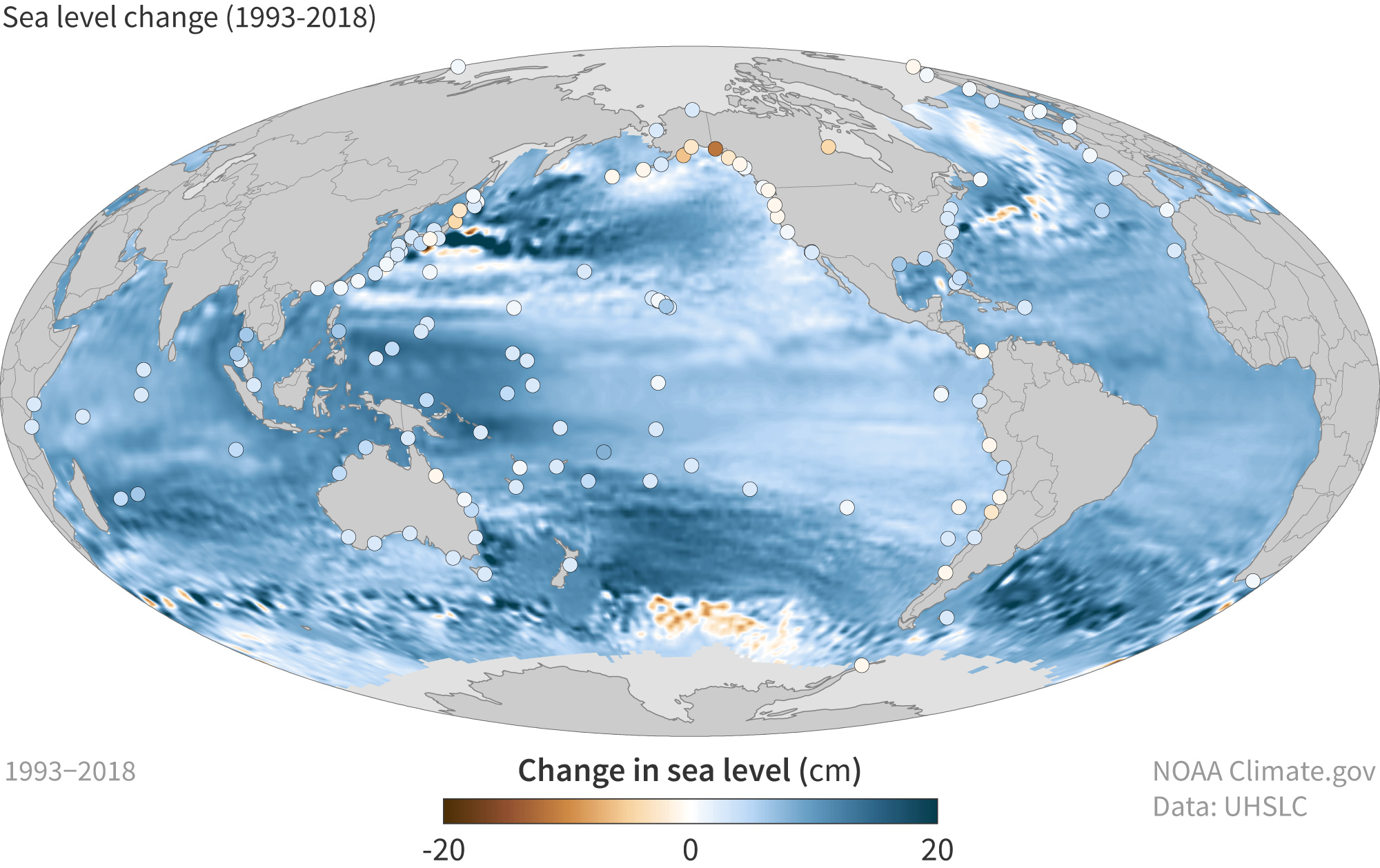
Sea level change 1993 to 2018

Climate change-driven rise of sea levels may pose an existential threat to the legal concept of statehood. Several low-lying island states, including Tuvalu, Kiribati, the Marshall Islands, and the Maldives, face the prospect of losing some or all of their physical territory within the coming decades, raising an unresolved question in international law whether a state can continue to exist if its land territory no longer exists.

Sea level rise threatens the territory of some states with permanent submergence or erosion. There are two theories of statehood, the declarative theory and the constitutive theory, but neither gives an answer to the question of statehood if a state loses the "territory" and "population" elements through an external process, rather than through conquest, secession, or dissolution.

== Climate Context ==
The Paris Agreement of 2015 seeks to stabilize the global mean sea level by limiting warming to “well below 2.0 ◦C above preindustrial levels” and to further pursue efforts to limit the temperature increase to 1.5 ◦C above pre-industrial levels.

Small island states have pressed for the more stringent 1.5°C target as a matter of survival since at least the 15th Conference of the Parties in Copenhagen in 2009, which produced the non-binding Copenhagen Accord.

Current national policies and pledges leave the world on a trajectory of roughly 2.6–2.9 °C of warming by 2100. An increase of 2.5°C would likely lead to a rise of global mean sea level of fifty-eight centimeters, or about two feet, with an uncertainty range of between thirty-seven and ninety-three centimeters by 2100, with sea levels continuing to rise after that. Under the intermediate (SSP2-4.5) emissions scenario associated with warming in this range, the IPCC’s Sixth Assessment Report projects a likely global mean sea-level rise of around 56 cm (a likely range of 43–76 cm) by 2100 relative to 1995–2014 levels, with sea levels continuing to rise for centuries afterward regardless of the emissions pathway eventually followed.

Atoll nations like Kiribati, the Marshall Islands, and Tuvalu in the Pacific, and the Maldives in the Indian Ocean, are especially vulnerable, since they consist entirely of low-lying coral reefs rising only a few metres above the sea level. In some Pacific regions, sea level rise has been occurring two to three times more quickly than the global average. A 2018 study concluded that wave-driven flooding, exacerbated by sea-level rise, would likely render most atoll islands uninhabitable by the middle of the 21st century, well before they are fully submerged.

Flooding from storm surge and high tides, which already make life on these islands difficult, can compromise habitability even before land is fully submerged. Like in 2013, the Marshall Islands suffered an extreme drought that threatened drinking water and crops where the country primarily depended on rainwater harvesting and shallow underground freshwater lenses for its drinking water and even a minor increase in sea level can submerge these islands permanently damaging freshwater resources thus making the island inhabitable.

A number of SIDS have developed creative solutions, such as polders and coastal defenses, to preserve their own survival in the face of significant sea-level rise. Nevertheless, these conservationist and short-term preventive actions are insufficient to prevent their region from being completely or partially submerged. SIDS and the International Commission propose some solutions themselves, like nations ex situ, creation of artificial territory, floating states, and purchasing and leasing of territories, but most lack the financial resources to fund these measures without substantial international assistance, which has not materialized at the scale needed.

== Proposed responses to territorial loss ==
Legal scholars and the affected states themselves have proposed several non-exclusive approaches by which a state might preserve its statehood, its population, or both, in the face of severe or total territorial loss.

=== Nations ex situ ===
A "nation ex situ" is a state that has lost its land-based territory and continues to be treated as a sovereign state, retaining the rights of statehood despite being is "de territorialized". Tuvalu, expected to be one of the first nations to be completely lost due to rising sea levels, enacted a constitutional amendment which states that "[t]he State of Tuvalu within its historical, cultural and legal framework shall remain in perpetuity in the future, notwithstanding the impacts of climate change or other causes resulting in loss to the physical territory of Tuvalu". In order to ensure Tuvalu's survival, Foreign Minister Simon Kofe said during COP27 that the country would become the "First Digital Nation", digitising government functions, historical records, and cultural material so that Tuvalu's identity and governmental operations could continue even if its territory disappears entirely and called on all the nations to recognise its statehood even if it loses all the land territory.Through its "Future Now Project," Tuvalu has also sought bilateral commitments from other states to recognise its statehood and existing maritime boundaries as permanent and even if Tuvalu completely disappears, the establishment of a digital nation would enable it to maintain its identity and carry on as a state. Some States, including Venezuela, the Bahamas, Saint Kitts, St Lucia, Vanuatu, Niue, Palau, Gabon, and Taiwan have recognised Tuvalu's Statehood as permanent.

=== Creation of artificial territory ===
States have long constructed artificial islands fixed to the seabed. The construction of man-made islands, which remain above water at high tide and which are permanently fixed to the bottom of the sea, is exercised by many nations. But the only shortcoming with such habitable islands is that they are not officially recognised by International Law as a "state". China began constructing and expanding artificial islands in disputed areas of the South China Sea, including the Spratly Islands, from around 2014.The United Arab Emirates has constructed large artificial islands such as Palm Jumeirah for tourism and housing, and the Maldives began construction of the artificial island of Hulhumalé in 1997, partly in response to rising seas. Additionally, in Maritime Delimitation and Territorial Questions between Qatar and Bahrain (2001), the International Court of Justice observed that international treaty law does not address whether low-tide elevations qualify as "territory," and that state practice on the question was not sufficiently consistent to have produced a customary rule either permitting or prohibiting their appropriation.

=== Purchasing territory ===
In the late 2000s, the Maldives was the first State to consider the idea of buying land in India or Sri Lanka as an insurance policy against climate change induced rising sea levels. In 2014, Kiribati completed the purchase of the roughly 2,200-hectare Natoavatu Estate on Vanua Levu, Fiji's second-largest island, for US$8.6 million, in an effort to strengthen its food and economic security in the face of climate change. In most cases, however, the seller State maintains formal sovereignty over the territory. For example, Kiribati's purchase of Fiji territory did not confer sovereignty over the land instead Kiribati became a mere private owner of the land. In this capacity, Kiribati had the right to occupy the land subject to the purchase, extract its natural resources and construct buildings, but the territorial State, Fiji, retains sovereignty over the land. Sovereignty is only transferred to the buying State if the seller State renounces its sovereignty over the transferred territory through the signing of a treaty. Given the rarity of this practice in modern international relations and the fact that it does not include the surrender of sovereignty over the leased or purchased area and purchasing territory is generally considered an unlikely full solution to territorial extinction, though it may provide a partial one if ownership and sovereignty are treated as separable.

=== Moving population ===
Under this scenario, much or all of the population of the displaced state relocates to another state's territory. The displaced state is given administrative authority by the receiving state. It may also indicate who owns the land. Nonetheless, the land would remain a part of the receiving state's sovereign territory. The agreement between the sending and receiving states would have to address issues including the nationality of the relocated individuals, their ability to vote and exercise other political rights, and their accountability for governance.

In 2006, residents of Lohachara Island in the Bay of Bengal, whose landmass had eroded away, relocated to nearby Sagar Island; in 2007, residents of Papua New Guinea's Carteret Islands began being evacuated to nearby Bougainville, in what is often described as one of the first relocations attributed to climate change.

International Lawyer, Rosemary G. Rayfuse, has pointed to an earlier historical precedent, describing this approach where, during the 1870s, tens of thousands of Icelanders were driven out of Iceland as a result of crushing poverty exacerbated by a devastating volcanic eruption that destroyed half the island. The Canadian government entered into an agreement with these settlers granting them a suitably large piece of land for their new colony, providing them with funding and livestock to assist in their resettlement, and guaranteeing their rights both as citizens of Canada and of Iceland for themselves and their descendants. The colony of New Iceland was run by a government committee elected from amongst the settlers. Located in what is now southern Manitoba, New Iceland eventually joined the province of Manitoba becoming fully integrated into Canada.

=== Moving state ===
This scenario resembles moving population, except that the receiving state cedes sovereignty over the territory as well as its use, typically through a treaty of cession. This would be accomplished by a treaty of cession. That is how the United States acquired the Louisiana Territories from France in 1803and what is now Alaska from Russia in 1867, and the Holy See's acquisition of Vatican City from Italy under the 1929 Lateran Treaty. A major difficulty with both the moving-population and moving-state approaches is the position of the current inhabitants of any territory offered for this purpose is that most of the world's habitable land is already occupied, and the limited economic resources of small island states would make it very difficult for them to negotiate the purchase of a substantial new territory. The majority of the planet's livable areas are currently occupied and also considering that these islands are economically vulnerable and challenged it would be very difficult to negotiate if they want to buy a piece of territory.

=== Association with another state ===
Some states have merged with, confederated with, or entered hybrid governance arrangements with others, a practice partly formalised by the 1978 Vienna Convention on Succession of States in respect of Treaties.In 1964, the small island state of Zanzibar, in the Indian Ocean, merged with the much larger nearby Tanganyika to form the United Republic of Tanzania and in 1990, the Yemen Arab Republic and the People's Democratic Republic of Yemen merged to become the Republic of Yemen. However, all of these resulted from political and not environmental developments. Association can produce a range of governance outcomes, from full absorption to a significant degree of continued self-government like the Cook Islands, for instance, are considered part of the "Realm of New Zealand" but have been self-governing since 1965, and Cook Islanders remain New Zealand citizens and hold New Zealand passports.
