= Carne Ross =

British diplomat and writer

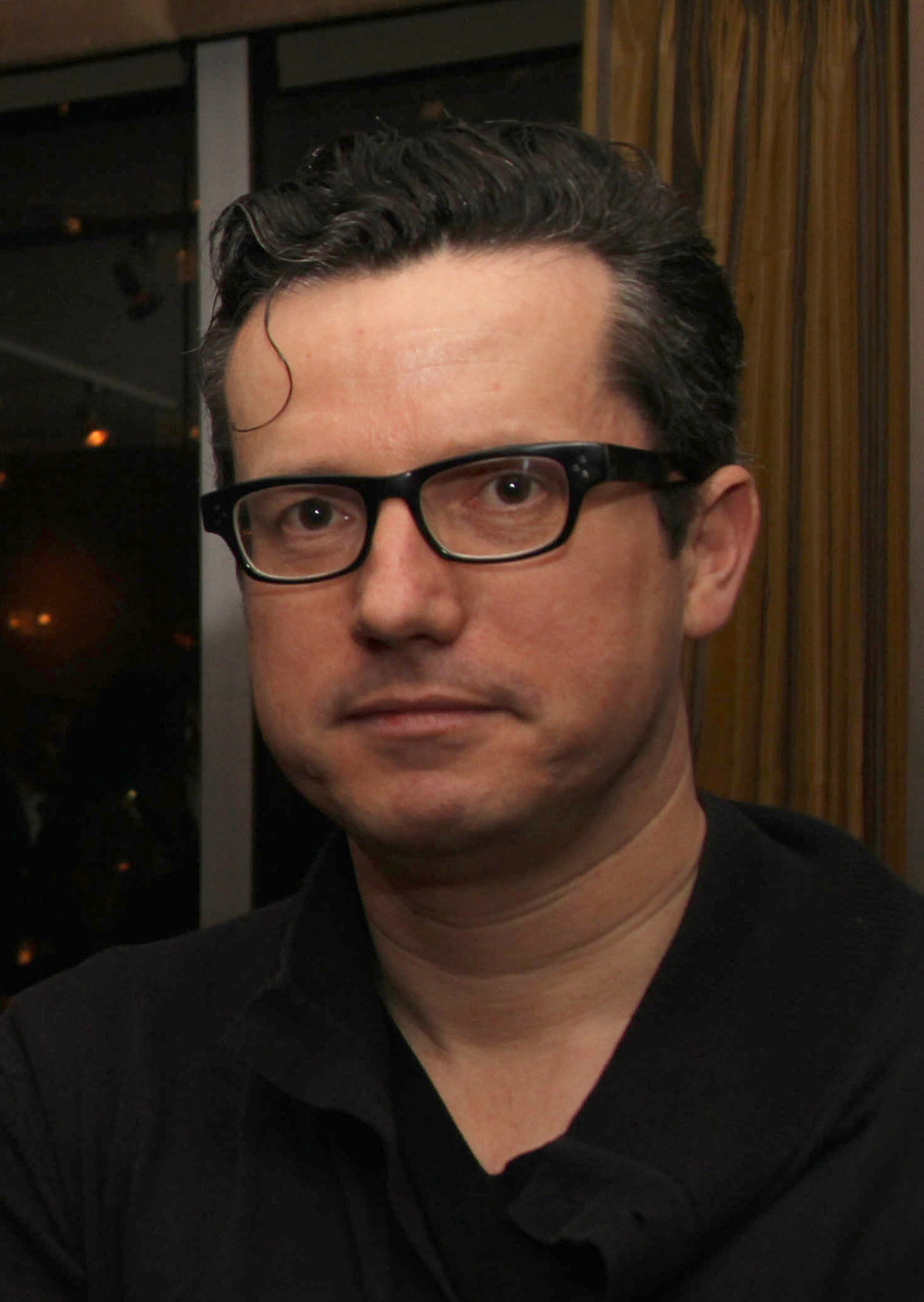
- Carne Ross in February 2012
- Born: 1966 (age 59–60)
- Education: University of Exeter
- Employer(s): British Foreign & Commonwealth Foreign Office
- Known for: Independent diplomat
- Political party: Green Party of England and Wales

Carne Ross (born 1966) is a British former diplomat who resigned over the Iraq War after giving secret testimony to the first official inquiry into the war. He is also the founder and former executive director of Independent Diplomat, a diplomatic advisory group. He is a writer, with books about the failures of diplomacy and the necessity of mass, popular political change and anarchism.

== Early life ==
Ross is the grandson of linguist and academic Alan S. C. Ross.

Ross graduated, in 1988, with a BA in Economics and Politics from the University of Exeter.

== Career ==
Following his studies, Ross worked for a charity for the long-term unemployed. Ross joined the British Foreign & Commonwealth Office in 1989. He worked in many capacities, including as head of the Arab/Israel section in the Near East and North Africa Department and as principal speechwriter to the Foreign Secretary. He served on the political staff of the UK embassies in Oslo, Bonn, and Kabul, as well as the UK Mission to the UN in New York, where he was responsible for Middle East policy, including Iraq, weapons inspections and sanctions, Western Sahara and Israel/Palestine.

He resigned from the Foreign Office in 2004 after 15 years of service, citing his secret evidence to the Butler Review as the reason. When he resigned, the Foreign Office threatened him with prosecution under the Official Secrets Act if he talked publicly about his work. Ross's evidence to Butler became public under parliamentary privilege in 2007; the evidence had been requested from him by an MP during his appearance before the Foreign Affairs Select Committee. The publication led to widespread calls, including by former Prime Minister John Major, for a full public inquiry into the Iraq War. Ross later publicly testified to the Chilcot Iraq Inquiry, whose report endorsed his testimony.

In 2004, he founded the non-governmental organisation Independent Diplomat, the world's first non-profit diplomatic advisory group, which advises and supports democratic countries, would-be states and liberation movements all over the world. These advisees include the democratic Syrian opposition, the Frente Polisario of Western Sahara, members of Ukrainian civil society and the Marshall Islands, a low-lying Pacific archipelago, who, with support from Independent Diplomat, recruited and led the High Ambition Coalition (HAC), a group of what became over a hundred countries at the 2015 UN Paris climate conference. Under the leadership of the foreign minister of the Marshall Islands, Tony deBrum, the HAC demanded and secured some of the most important elements of the resulting Paris Agreement, including the target of 1.5 °C.

== Publications and documentary ==
Hurst (UK) and Cornell University Press (US) published Ross's first book, Independent Diplomat: Dispatches from an Unaccountable Elite, in 2007, a critique of the practices and culture of contemporary diplomacy that drew on Ross's experiences as a diplomat. Simon & Schuster (UK) and Penguin (US) published The Leaderless Revolution in 2011, which explores the need for and methods of a bottom-up revolution: essentially, anarchism. Both books have been re-published in multiple countries, including Japan, Albania and South Korea. Many thousands of copies of The Leaderless Revolution were distributed across the Middle East under a scheme sponsored by the Kuwaiti government. In 2000, Ross wrote The Fox, a play that ran in an off-Broadway theatre in New York City.

In the acknowledgements section of his 2013 novel, A Delicate Truth, John le Carré thanks Ross for "his example demonstrat[ing] the perils of speaking a delicate truth to power."

In 2017, BBC Four broadcast Accidental Anarchist, a documentary about Ross's life and ideas. The documentary charts Ross's journey from a civil servant in the Foreign and Commonwealth Office to an anarchist. The linguist, cognitive scientist and political activist Noam Chomsky appears in the documentary. Ross explores the philosophy of democratic confederalism developed by Abdullah Öcalan and its influence on Kurdish groups in the Syrian Civil War such as the YPG and YPJ. Ross sees these groups as anarchist.

== Politics ==
Ross is the Green Party spokesperson for global solidarity, and stood for election in Islington South and Finsbury in the 2024 general election. He finished in second place with 17.5% of the vote.

== Selected works ==
- Ross, Carne (2007). Independent Diplomat: Dispatches from an Unaccountable Elite. Cornell University Press. ISBN 978-0-8014-4557-6.
- Ross, Carne (2012). The Leaderless Revolution: How Ordinary People Will Take Power and Change Politics in the Twenty-First Century. Blue Rider Press. ISBN 978-0-399-15872-8.
- Ross, Carne (2019). "Chapter 29: The time is now". In Extinction Rebellion (ed.). This Is Not a Drill: An Extinction Rebellion Handbook. Penguin Books. pp. 176–180. ISBN 9780141991443.
- Ross, Carne (2026). There We Are Human Again. Perspectiva Press. ISBN 978-1-914568-10-7.
