= Islands First =

Islands First is a non-governmental organization working on behalf of the Small Island Developing States to confront the challenges of climate change, the depletion of ocean resources (including ocean acidification and biodiversity loss), and ocean level's rise.

== Background and mission ==
Small island countries have been the first to suffer the negative consequences of climate change and global warming, despite bearing little responsibility for creating the problem. Islands First seeks to foster an appreciation for the need to rapidly cut carbon dioxide emissions with international policy makers.

== Historical precedents for small island action at the United Nations ==
Cooperation among the small island states, the scientific community, and the environmental community on this scale would be historically unprecedented, but it would not be the first time the small island states have mobilized politically and became powerful agents of environmental change. In fact, a concerted effort by a group of small island states put climate change on the UN agenda back in 1988, when Malta persuaded the General Assembly to recognize the potential for "severe economic and social consequences" from climate change. The Republic of Maldives followed suit by hosting the 1989 Small States Conference on Sea Level Rise, which resulted in the "Malé Declaration on Global Warming and Sea Level Rise". The Conference also saw the creation of an Action Group on climate change consisting of more than 30 small island states, later to become the Alliance of Small Island States (AOSIS). This momentum continued through the 1992 "Earth Summit" in Rio de Janeiro, where AOSIS, aided by the Foundation for Environmental Law and Development (FIELD) and other NGOs, successfully lobbied for the United Nations Framework Convention on Climate Change (UNFCCC). It was thus fitting that the Maldives became the first signatory to the third protocol of the UNFCCC, also known as the Kyoto Protocol.

Similarly, the tiny Republic of Palau, with a mandate from an activist-minded President and a concerned legislature, began in May 2004 what appeared to be a quixotic effort to stop bottom trawling, an odious method of fishing that irreparably damages some of the world's most biologically diverse coral reefs and is sometimes practiced by multinational fishing corporations. Under the guidance of Palau's Ambassador Stuart Beck, a Yale-trained lawyer and Chairman of Islands First, the Palau Mission and a cohort of New York University (NYU) law students worked within the UN system to change the law of the sea, not only for Palau, but for the entire world. These law students negotiated on Palau's behalf at the United Nations, interfaced with scientists and NGOs committed to eradicating the practice, and coordinated Palau's efforts with other likeminded missions. All of this hard work has already begun to pay dividends. The year 2006 saw the passage of the Nadi Declaration, which commits the sixteen members of the Pacific Islands Forum to advocate for prohibitions on bottom trawling and other destructive fishing practices in international waters, prompting the Deep Sea Conservation Coalition to issue a press statement reading:

"If all nations that purport to support urgent action to protect the biodiversity of the international waters of the world's oceans from bottom trawl fishing, were as consistent and persistent as the Republic of Palau, the deep sea habitats of the high seas would undoubtedly already be safe from high seas bottom trawling."

The Palau Mission continued to push its agenda at the United Nations and played a critical role in rallying support for General Assembly Resolution 61/105, which, among other things, established a new global governance regime for protecting vulnerable marine ecosystems. As reported by the BBC, "The landmark deal will restrict bottom-trawling, which experts say destroys coral reefs and stirs up clouds of sediment that suffocate marine life." The operators of industrial fishing fleets around the world have taken notice and many have already started retooling their vessels. The result of the alliance between the Palau Mission and NYU has been one of the largest gains in ocean policy since the UN Convention on the Law of the Sea was concluded in 1982.

These achievements are remarkable, not only because of their global ramifications, but because they were led by countries with very few resources at their disposal. In fact, Palau's UN Mission did not have a single paid employee during its campaign against bottom trawling. Without this newfound capacity in the form of legal advisors, improved cooperation with interested NGOs, and an ongoing dialogue with Palau's committed political leaders, none of what transpired would have been possible. These examples of political upstarts navigating a system of entrenched power vividly demonstrate what is possible at the United Nations when a committed and organized group of countries decides to act. They also illustrate why the need for an organization like Islands First is so urgent.
