= Anna Rasmussen (climate expert) =

Samoan climate activist

Anne Rasmussen
- Education: University of the South Pacific
- Known for: Chief negotiator for small island states at COP28

Anne Rasmussen is a Samoan climate expert from Samoa. At the 2023 United Nations Climate Change Conference (COP28) she was the chief negotiator for the Alliance of Small Island States.

== Life ==
Rasmussen was brought up on Samoa which is a country made up of six small Pacific islands. She studied geography at the University of the South Pacific and graduated. She went on to gain a post graduate qualification in climate change.

In 2009 she first became involved in representing her country in climate negotiations and by COP18 in 2012 in Doha, she was co-chairing meetings. At COP24 she began leading the negotiations on climate finance, the Green Climate Fund and the Global Environment Facility for the Alliance of Small Island States (AOSIS). In 2022, at COP27 she was a vice-president organising the election of officers of regional groups for the climate negotiations process.

At COP28 she was the Chief Negotiator for AOSIS. Samoan minister Toeolesulusulu Cedric Schuster, of the Alliance of Small Island States was arguing for stronger recognition, saying that AOSIS "would not sign their own death certificate". On the final day the AOSIS group discussed the final agreement. There was concern that the proposed text contained too many loopholes. Consensus was agreed at and the AOSIS group moved into the hall where the decision was to be made. They were shocked to find that the decision had been made without them. Tina Stege noted that the agreement represented an improvement but it was insufficient to save her country - the low lying Marshall Islands. Rasmussen spoke about the "litany of loopholes". She complained that they were "not in the room" and that the "business-as-usual" agreement had not delivered the "course correction" that was required. She was given a standing ovation for her protest.
