= A Delicate Truth =

2013 spy novel by John le Carré

- First edition
- Author: John le Carré
- Language: English
- Genre: Spy fiction
- Publisher: Viking Press
- Publication date: 25 April 2013
- Publication place: United Kingdom
- Media type: Print (hardcover and paperback)
- Pages: 320
- ISBN: 9780670922796
- OCLC: 818953744
- LC Class: PR6062.E33 L43 2013

A Delicate Truth is a 2013 spy novel by British writer John le Carré. Set in 2008 and 2011, the book features a British-American covert mission in Gibraltar and the subsequent consequences for two British civil servants.

Le Carré describes this as not only his most British novel but also his most autobiographical work in years. The author told The Daily Telegraph that he has based two of the book's characters on himself. Le Carré sees Toby Bell as "the thirty-something rising star of Her Majesty's Foreign Service ... the striving ambitious fellow I fancy myself to have been at much the same age" – whereas Sir Christopher ("Kit") Probyn is "a retired Foreign Office civil servant, who lives in rural Cornwall" – the author "lived in a clifftop house outside St Buryan, near Land's End, for more than 40 years".

The novel may be loosely based on Operation Flavius, the 1988 operation during which three members of the Provisional IRA were shot dead by the British SAS in Gibraltar.

== Plot ==
In 2008, Toby Bell, the Private Secretary to junior Foreign Office minister Fergus Quinn, becomes suspicious of his superior's behavior following a meeting with businessman Jay Crispin—founder of the private security firm Ethical Outcomes—and the company's financier, Miss Maisie, an independently wealthy, Islamophobic American evangelical. Digging into Quinn's history, Bell learns that Quinn had previously been involved in a minor scandal related to Ethical Outcomes at his previous posting. Under the guidance of his mentor, Giles Oakley, Bell secretly records a conversation between Quinn, Crispin, and an intelligence liaison code named "Paul" about a planned covert operation codenamed Wildlife. When Bell attempts to turn the recording over to Oakley, who has been researching Ethical Outcomes himself, he tells him to forget everything he has learned and drop the matter.

Without Bell's knowledge, Wildlife takes place in Gibraltar, where a company of British Special Forces under the command of a man named Jeb are tasked with helping an Ethical Outcomes team of American mercenaries with extracting a high-ranking jihadist arms dealer allegedly squatting in an abandoned vacation home. As Paul—acting as a neutral liaison between English and American intelligence—observes from a blind, a strike team lays siege to the house. He is assured that the operation is a complete success and that the jihadist has been taken alive for questioning.

Three years later, "Paul"—revealed to be a low-ranking career diplomat named Sir Christopher "Kit" Probyn—is living in retirement in Cornwall, where he comes across Jeb during a county fair. Now homeless and living in his van, Jeb informs Paul that, contrary to what he was told, the intelligence was faulty and the "jihadist" was, in fact, a refugee woman hiding with her infant daughter, both of whom were shot to death after a premature call to open fire. In the aftermath, their bodies were quietly disposed of and Quinn blamed for the operation's failure, with no attempts made to identify the victims and no responsibility accepted by either the American or British governments.

Probyn contacts Jay Crispin, who tells him that nobody was killed and that Jeb is mentally unstable and suffering from war-related PTSD. Jeb later meets Probyn in secret and provides him with a detailed account of the botched operation; the two decide to meet and write a complete report on Wildlife that they will present to the Ministry of Defence. When Jeb fails to show up at the meeting, Probyn contacts Toby Bell.

Probyn is surprised to discover that Bell was kept in the dark about Wildlife and that all his knowledge about it comes from the secret recording. Acting on Probyn's behalf, Bell looks for Jeb, only to discover that he allegedly committed suicide the day of his planned meeting with Probyn. Inconsistencies regarding his manner of death lead Bell to believe that he was murdered by Crispin with the acquiescence of the local police. Following a lead given to him by Jeb's widow, Bell retrieves photos Jeb took of the bodies and contacts "Shorty," another soldier who was present at Wildlife and disturbed by the outcome. Bell further reconnects with Giles Oakley, now a private banker, for advice; Bell learns that a guilt-stricken Oakley has suffered a nervous breakdown and the two part ways after Oakley makes awkward sexual overtures towards Bell. Over the course of the investigation, Bell grows close to Emily, Kit's daughter, an emergency room doctor concerned that her father is getting in over his head.

Posing as a reporter, Bell arranges a meeting with Shorty, intending to get him to speak on the record about the botched operation. Meanwhile, Probyn attempts to trigger an official investigation by communicating his half of the Wildlife dossier to the Foreign Office, but is rebuffed and threatened with a secret trial. Bell meets with Shorty, revealed to have accepted a high-paying job at Ethical Outcomes in exchange for his silence. Shorty assists Crispin's mercenaries in abducting Bell and taking him to a compound in North London, where Bell is offered a similar arrangement. Realizing that Crispin is panicking and that he overstepped his bounds with Jeb's murder, Bell refuses to drop the matter and returns home. That night, he's beaten nearly to the point of death by Crispin's mercenaries as a warning not to go any further.

Bell is rescued by Emily, who arrives to check in on him after learning about her father's ordeal with the Foreign Office. As Emily tends to Bell's wounds, Giles Oakley arrives, having suffered a crisis of conscience and stolen the "Aftermath and Recommendations" dossier on Wildlife that outlines the failure of the operation. His own computer having been compromised, Emily takes Toby to an internet cafe, where they email his recording, Jeb's photos, and Giles' dossier to several press outlets in the United Kingdom and the United States. Hearing police sirens coming from all directions, Bell and Emily wonder if the authorities are coming for them, or if they are simply responding to an unrelated emergency.

== Reception ==
Publishers Weekly describes the novel as "entertainingly labyrinthine if overly polemical." The anonymous reviewer believes that le Carré "tells a great story in sterling prose, but he veers dangerously close to farce and caricature, particularly with the comically amoral Americans. His best work has been about the moral ambiguity of spying, while this novel feels as if the issue of who's bad and who's good is too neatly sewn up."

Kirkus Reviews notes that le Carré "resolutely keeping potential action sequences just offstage," and "focuses instead on the moral rot and creeping terror barely concealed by the affable old-boy blather that marks the pillars of the intelligence community."

Bill Ott, writing for Booklist, believes "Le Carré further establishes himself as a master of a new, shockingly realistic kind of noir in which right-thinking individuals who challenge the institutional order of things always lose."

The Guardian calls it a "thriller that resonates with Whitehall secrecy during the Bush-Blair era", and praises its depiction of how "the last decade in US and UK relations has been dominated by conflicts justified through secret intelligence that proved to be false."

== Adaptations ==
=== Radio ===
A Delicate Truth was broadcast in ten parts on BBC Radio 4 in May 2013. It was abridged by Sally Marmion and was read by Damian Lewis.

=== Audio download ===
In 2013, Penguin Books released an Audio Download version of A Delicate Truth. Unusually this is narrated by le Carré himself. Mark Lawson, writing for The Guardian, thought that "[le Carré's] audiobook recordings [provide] an extra treat for his readers. Every speaker has a specified accent and there is an acute ear for other verbal tells, from the casual profanity of younger characters, regardless of class, to the fact that Bell knows that he has been frozen out when the minister stops calling him "Tobe" and reverts to "Toby"."

=== Film adaptation ===
In April 2013, Adam Chitwood noted in Collider that screenwriter William Monahan was "in advanced talks to adapt A Delicate Truth... BBC Films is developing the adaptation but there's no timetable for when the pic might get in front of cameras."
