= Lois Michele Young =

Belizean diplomat and Permanent Representative to UN

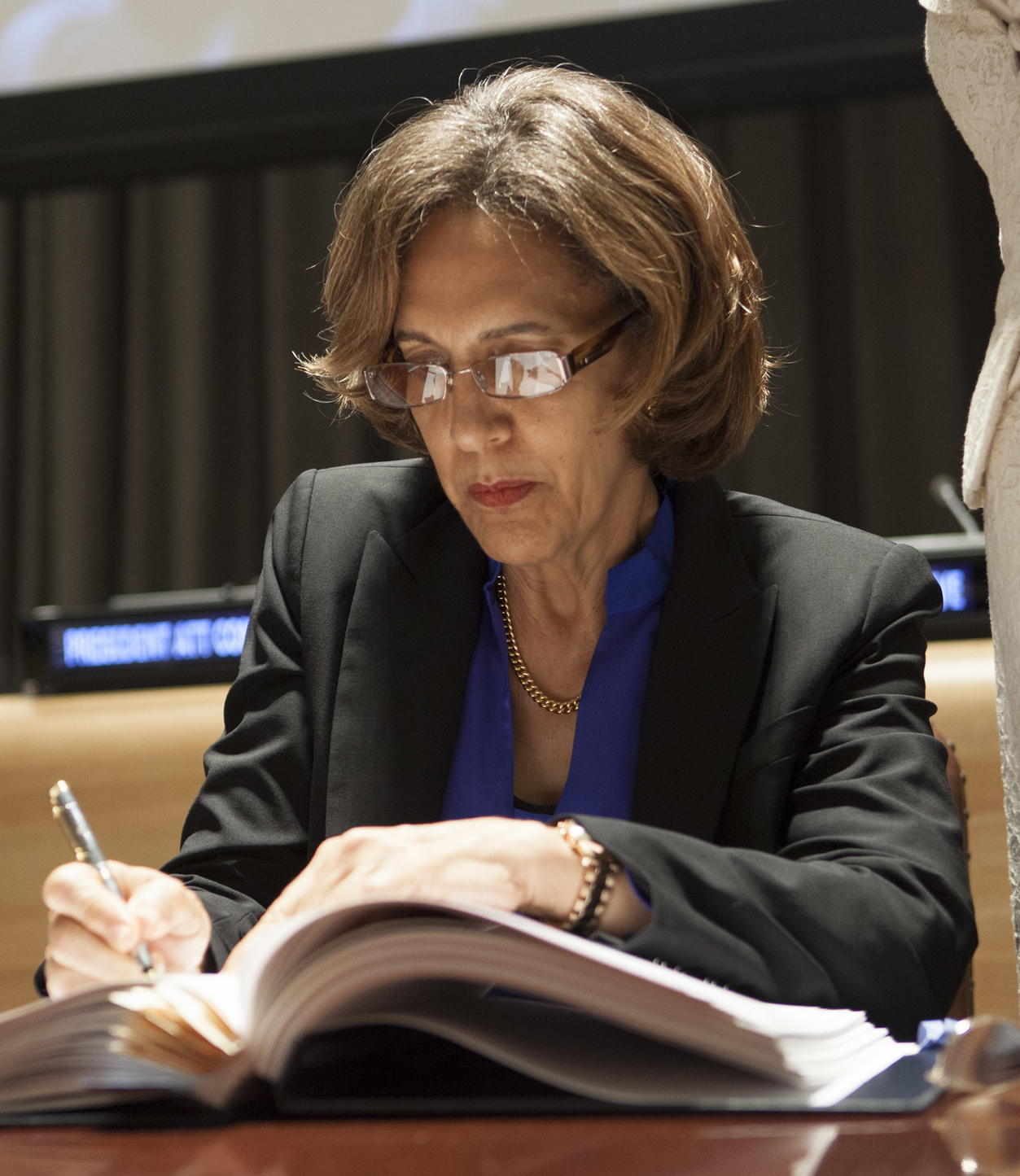

Permanent Representative of Belize to the United Nations
- Incumbent
- Assumed office 19 September 2012

Personal details
- Born: 19 January 1951 (age 75) Belize
- Education: King's College London

Lois Michele Young (born 19 January 1951) is a Belizean diplomat who currently serves as the Permanent Representative of Belize to the United Nations.

Young graduated with a bachelor's degree in law from King's College London. She has been a member of the Bar Association of Belize since 1976, and was previously Head of Chambers at Lois Young Barrow and Co. From 1975 to 1976 she was a Public Prosecutor in the Office of Public Prosecutions, a Crown Counsel in the Ministry of the Attorney General, and a magistrate. She chaired the Belize Social Security Appeals Tribunal from 1989 to 2002 and chaired the Board of Directors of the Social Security Chamber from 2008.

== See also ==
- List of current permanent representatives to the United Nations
