= World Ocean Conference =

International conference in 2009

World Ocean Conference 2009

Information
- Date: 11–14 May 2009
- Location: Grand Kawanua Convention Center, Manado, Indonesia
- Participants: 83 countries

The World Ocean Conference 2009 (WOC) was an international conference to develop a common understanding and firm commitment to address the adverse impact of climate change on the state of the world's oceans, and increase understanding on the role of the oceans as ‘climate moderator’. This conference includes diplomats and heads of state from a number of countries. It took place in May 2009 in Manado, Indonesia. Its topic is the threat to various nations from rising oceans due to global warming.

The conference was scheduled to be held from 11–14 May, included hundreds of officials and experts from over 74 countries. It is seen as a prelude to talks in December 2009 regarding a successor agreement to the Kyoto Protocol.

== Background ==
The 1982 United Nations Convention on the Law of the Sea (UNCLOS), as the instrument that sets out the legal framework within which all activities in the oceans and seas must be carried out, the United Nations Framework Convention on Climate Change (UNFCCC) and its Kyoto Protocol, the Convention on Biological Diversity (CBD), and the Convention on the Prevention of Marine Pollution by Dumping of Wastes and Other Matter, 1972, and its 1996 Protocol. Recognises that oceans and coasts provide valuable resources and services to support human populations, particularly coastal communities that heavily depend on them. Sustainable use of marine living resources will enhance global food security and reduce poverty for present and future generations. The declaration will be put forward to the UN FCCC and hopefully adopted at the COP 15 in Copenhagen at the end of the year.

Climate change issues that could potentially result on inter alia. Degradation of marine environment, in particular the loss of marine diversity, threatened marine ecosystems by land-based and sea-based pollution, alien invasive species, unsustainable use of marine and coastal resources, physical alteration, poor land-use planning, and socio-economic pressures, equally concerned over marine ecosystems and living resources being affected by sea level rise, increased water temperature, ocean acidification, changing weather patterns, and other variations that may result from climate change, and how these alterations may aggravate the existing pressures of marine environmental degradation and increase risks to global food security, economic prosperity, and the well-being of human populations.

Realizing the detrimental effects and importance of climate change, The WOC agreed to discuss the commitments on how to increase the role ocean in reducing the impact of climate change. The WOC have three main interests of states:

- SIDS - very concern on sea-level rise (Indonesia is the largest archipelagical country in the world). Climate change is particularly threatening to Indonesia as sea level rise would adversely affect many Indonesia's low-lying coastal areas.
- Tropical developing states - on adaptation measures, food security, and livelihood
- Developed states - observing the possibility that the ocean could function as "Carbon Sink"

== Objectives ==
The main purpose of the WOC 2009 was the adoption of Manado Ocean Declaration (MOD). The declaration consists of 14 core opening paragraphs and 21 points of operative agreement. The contents of the declaration include the commitment to long-term conservation, management, and sustainable use of marine living resources, establish national strategies to sustainably manage marine and coastal ecosystems and enhance their resilience, reduce land- and sea-based pollution, and also to increase understanding and information exchange on coasts, oceans and climate change, particularly in developing countries.

Despite criticism the MOD was not strong enough to push the international community to help developing nations deal with the impacts of climate change, Indonesian Maritime Affairs and Fisheries Minister Freddy Numberi, chairman of the conference, said the WOC had put oceans center stage in world attention and raised awareness of the importance of oceans in climate change. But representatives from both developed and developing countries expressed satisfaction with the results.

== See also ==
- Ocean acidification
- Kyoto Protocol
- Copenhagen Accord
