= Barbados Programme of Action =

United Nations policy document

The United Nations Programme of Action on the Sustainable Development of Small Island Developing States, popularly referred to as the Barbados Program of Action (BPOA), is a policy document that both: comprehensively addresses the economic, environmental, and social developmental vulnerabilities facing islands; and outlines a strategy that seeks to mitigate those vulnerabilities. It remains the only internationally approved programme specific to Small Island Developing States (SIDS) which has been collectively and unanimously endorsed by SIDS.

== Development of the BPOA ==
The full text of the BPOA was produced in Bridgetown, Barbados, in 1994 at the first Global Conference on the Sustainable Development of Small Island States, a conference mandated by United Nations General Assembly Resolution 47/189. The need for an islands specific conference was highlighted some two years prior at the 1992 United Nations Conference on Environment and Development (Earth Summit), held in Rio de Janeiro where 179 governments voted to adopt Agenda 21. Chapter 17, section G of Agenda 21 acknowledges that "small island developing states are a special case both for environment and development ... [and] are considered extremely vulnerable to global warming and sea level rise." Another important portion of the programme highlighted through the Small Island Developing tend to not only have minuscule fragile economies and limited access to technology and resources.

== BPOA+5 ==
In 1999, the General Assembly of the UN held a special session to appraise five years of progress on the implementation of the BPOA (BPOA +5). The Assembly recognized progress as 'uneven' and identified key trends including increasing globalization, widening inequalities in income and a continued deterioration of the global environment. A new General Assembly Resolution (S-22/2) promised further action.

== BPOA+10 ==
The Johannesburg Plan of Implementation, agreed to at the World Summit on Sustainable Development (Earth Summit 2002) affirmed UN commitment to 'full implementation' of Agenda 21, alongside achievement of the Millennium Development Goals, the BPOA, and other international agreements. To this end, it recommended the convening of an International Meeting to Review the Implementation of the Program of Action for the Sustainable Development of Small Island Developing States. Upon receipt of the recommendation, the General Assembly of the UN passed Resolutions 57/262 and 58/213, which mandated an International Meeting to Review the Implementation of the Programme of Action for the Sustainable Development of Small Island Developing States to take place. The meeting was held in Port Louis, Mauritius, during January 10–14, 2005. The final report emerging from this meeting significantly revised the original BPOA, and verified what previous reviews were alluding to, that the implementation of the BPOA had been largely unsuccessful. What emerged from it was a reorganising of the Programs "priority areas" and an entrenched commitment to the notion that economic growth would ultimately contribute to sustainable development.
