= High Ambition Coalition =

Informal organisation of countries to mitigate climate change

The High Ambition Coalition (HAC) is an informal group of countries within the United Nations Framework Convention on Climate Change (UNFCCC) committed to advancing progressive proposals on climate ambition. The HAC was founded by the Republic of the Marshall Islands in 2014 with the aim of ensuring the Paris Agreement, adopted in 2015, was as ambitious as possible. The group succeeded in securing the Paris Agreement's most ambitious provisions, including the five year ratchet-up cycles of nationally-determined contributions, as well as language in Article 2 related to pursuing efforts to limit the temperature increase to 1.5 degrees Celsius above pre-industrial levels. The Republic of the Marshall Islands serves as the convener and secretariat of the HAC.

There is no official list of the group's members, but as of 2022, countries in the HAC include Antigua & Barbuda, Barbados, Chile, Colombia, Finland, Fiji, France, Gabon, Germany, Ireland, Jamaica, Luxembourg, the Netherlands, New Zealand, Norway, Palau, the Marshall Islands, Spain, Sweden, and the United Kingdom, among others.

The Coalition is currently chaired by Marshallese climate envoy Tina Stege.

The High Ambition Coalition is distinct from, but coordinates with, the Shipping High Ambition Coalition within the International Maritime Organization; the High Ambition Coalition for Nature and People, which is focused on ambition in biodiversity protection (30 by 30) in the Convention on Biological Diversity; and the High Ambition Coalition to End Plastic Pollution.

== Criticism ==
Criticism has focused on the name compared to the pledges made by the countries and on the fact that as of 2019, many of the listed countries are not well on track to achieving the general Paris Agreement goals.

== See also ==
- Tony deBrum
- Paris Agreement
- Effects of climate change on island nations
