= Small Island Developing States =

Developing countries that are small island countries

Map of the Small Island Developing States

The Small Island Developing States (SIDS) are a grouping of developing countries which are small island countries and small states that tend to share similar sustainable development challenges. These include small but growing populations, limited resources, remoteness, susceptibility to natural disasters, vulnerability to external shocks, excessive dependence on international trade, and fragile environments. Their growth and development are also held back by high communication, energy and transportation costs, irregular international transport volumes, disproportionately expensive public administration and infrastructure due to their small size, and little to no opportunity to create economies of scale. They consist of some of the most vulnerable countries to anthropogenic climate change.

The SIDS were first recognized as a distinct group of developing countries at the United Nations Conference on Environment and Development in June 1992. The Barbados Programme of Action was produced in 1994 to assist the SIDS in their sustainable development efforts. The United Nations Office of the High Representative for the Least Developed Countries, Landlocked Developing Countries and Small Island Developing States (UN-OHRLLS) represents the group of states.

== List of SIDS ==
As of 2023, the United Nations Office of the High Representative for the Least Developed Countries, Landlocked Developing Countries and Small Island Developing States (UN-OHRLLS) lists 57 such nations (39 sovereign states and 18 dependent territories). These nations are grouped into three geographical regions: the Caribbean; the Pacific; and Africa, Indian Ocean, Mediterranean and South China Sea (AIMS), including 18 Associate Members of the United Nations Regional Commissions. Each of these regions has a regional cooperation body: the Caribbean Community, the Pacific Islands Forum, and the Indian Ocean Commission respectively, which many SIDS are members or associate members of. In addition, most (but not all) SIDS are members of the Alliance of Small Island States (AOSIS), which performs lobbying and negotiating functions for the SIDS within the United Nations System.

Caribbean	Pacific	Africa, Indian Ocean, Mediterranean and South China Sea (AIMS)
Anguilla (Note: Neither member nor observer of the Alliance of Small Island States) (Note: Associate member of regional cooperation body) (Note: Dependent territories)	American Samoa (Note: Observer of the Alliance of Small Island States) (Note: Neither member nor observer of regional cooperation body)	Cape Verde
Antigua and Barbuda	Cook Islands	Comoros (Note: Also a least developed country)
Aruba (Note: Observer of the Alliance of Small States as part of the Netherlands Antilles) (Note: Observer of regional cooperation body)	Fiji	Guinea-Bissau (Note: Belize, Guinea-Bissau, Guyana, and Suriname are included even though they are not island countries. This may be because they are low-lying coastal countries whose economies are dependent on a small number of activities. Their classification as SIDS is controversial.)
Bahamas	French Polynesia	Maldives
Barbados	Guam	Mauritius
Belize	Kiribati	São Tomé and Príncipe
Bermuda	Marshall Islands	Seychelles
British Virgin Islands	Micronesia	Singapore
Cayman Islands	Nauru	
Cuba	New Caledonia	
Curaçao	Niue	
Dominica	Northern Mariana Islands	
Dominican Republic	Palau	
Grenada	Papua New Guinea	
Guadeloupe (Note: Overseas departments and regions of France)	Samoa	
Guyana	Solomon Islands	
Haiti	Timor-Leste	
Jamaica	Tonga	
Martinique	Tuvalu	
Montserrat	Vanuatu	
Puerto Rico		
Saint Kitts and Nevis		
Saint Lucia		
Saint Vincent and the Grenadines		
Sint Maarten		
Suriname		
Trinidad and Tobago		
Turks and Caicos Islands		
U.S. Virgin Islands		

== Impacts of climate change ==
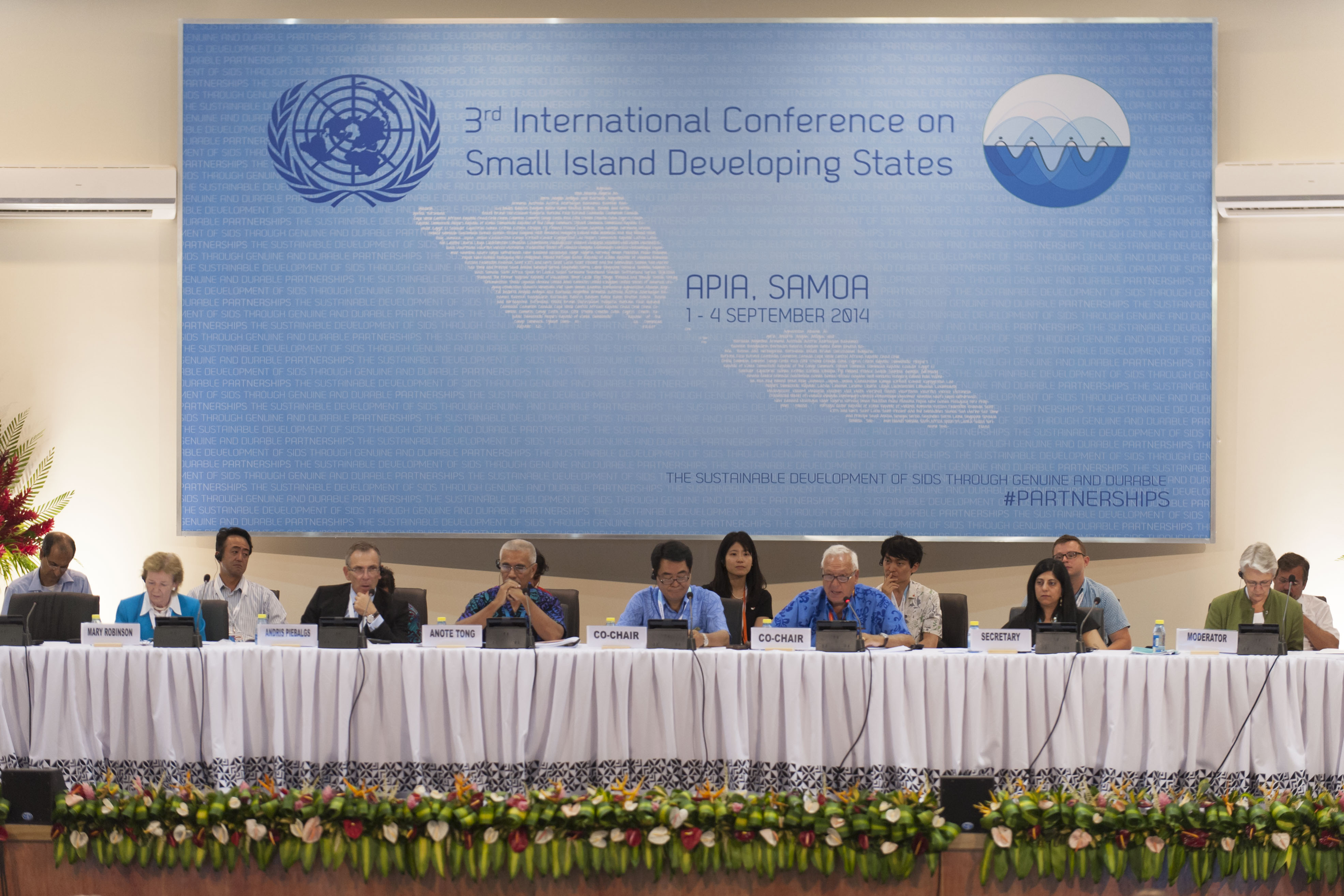
3rd International Conference on Small Island Developing States, Samoa, September 2014

The SIDS are some of the regions most vulnerable to anthropogenic climate change. Due to their oceanic environment, SIDS are especially vulnerable to the marine effects of climate change like sea level rise, ocean acidification, marine heatwaves, and the increase in cyclone intensity. Changing precipitation patterns could also cause droughts. Many citizens of SIDS live near a coastline, meaning that they have a high risk exposure to the effects of marine climate change. Additional climate change vulnerability comes through their economies: many SIDS have economies that are based on natural resources, such as ecotourism, fishing, or agriculture. Phenomena like sea level rise, coastal erosion, and severe storms have the potential to severely impact their economies.

In addition to these vulnerabilities, the energy sector in Small Island Developing States faces unique challenges and opportunities, particularly in the least-electrified regions. According to the March 2024 IRENA report, "Small Island Developing States at a Crossroads: Towards Equitable Energy Access in Least-Electrified Countries," these states, which contribute less than 1% to global greenhouse gas emissions, are exploring decentralized renewable energy solutions to address their energy access issues. Technologies such as biomass gasification, small-scale hydro, and solar PV not only offer paths to reduce their carbon footprint but also enhance resilience against climate impacts. The report highlights case studies from Guinea-Bissau, Papua New Guinea, and Vanuatu, showing significant socio-economic benefits from improved energy access, including increased income opportunities for rural women and reduced indoor air pollution. These advancements are crucial as they not only provide immediate relief but also contribute to long-term sustainability and resilience against future climate challenges."

== Sustainable Development Goals ==
Small island developing states are mentioned in several of the Sustainable Development Goals. For example, Target 7 of Sustainable Development Goal 14 ("Life below Water") states: "By 2030, increase the economic benefits to small island developing States and least developed countries from the sustainable use of marine resources, including through sustainable management of fisheries, aquaculture and tourism".

Several Small Island Developing States (SIDS), including Palau and Orkney, have launched renewable energy initiatives to improve energy efficiency and reduce reliance on fossil fuels; Palau has set a target of transitioning to 45% renewable energy by 2025, while Orkney is expanding its use of tidal turbines to create a 50 MW array.

Mauritius developed the SIDS GBN Forum 2018 to Strengthen private sector partnerships for sustainable tourism development with key speakers from around the world like Mr. Paul Holthus, Founding President and CEO, World Ocean Council, or Mr. Pascal Viroleau, Chief Executive Officer, Vanilla Islands Organization and Prof Geoffrey Lipman, President, International Coalition of Tourism Partners

== Deep-sea mining ==
Small Island Developing States (SIDS) are complex actors within the field of deep-sea mining. SIDS are small island communities that hold the status of developing countries due to their economic, political, and social limitations and challenges. Despite their small size and relatively limited political and economic capital, their geographic position means that they are often perceived as so-called ‘Large Ocean States’. This self-perception is rooted in the fact that many SIDS lay territorial claims to the vast areas of ocean surrounding their small islands and the resources that belong to these areas.

Given the global distribution of seabed resources, it is particularly important that a substantial share of the raw materials and critical minerals found on the ocean floor lies within, or in close proximity to, the Exclusive Economic Zones (EEZs) of many SIDS. This geographic advantage elevates these islands as increasingly important political and economic actors in the emerging deep-sea mining industry. Their positions, however, are also shaped by historical legacies, most notably the enduring impacts of slavery and colonialism, which in many cases resulted in the severe depletion of local resources and long-term constraints on wealth and development. As a result, many of these states feel a strong imperative to avoid once again being exploited for their natural resources, and they therefore seek to maximize their influence through participation in supranational organizations.

=== SIDS and Deep-sea mining in the Clarion-Clipperton Zone ===
There are 57 SIDS worldwide, according to the United Nations. Several of these states are geographically located near potentially lucrative deep-sea mining zones. One of the most promising of these areas is the Clarion-Clipperton Zone, whose resource potential has prompted a number of SIDS to initiate or explore early-stage deep-sea mining projects. According to economic assessments published by The Metals Company in 2025, mining polymetallic nodules in the Clarion-Clipperton Zone could potentially generate substantial economic returns. In its public release, the company states that two separate economic studies estimate a combined net present value in the high tens of billions of USD for the Clarion-Clipperton Zone as a whole, and approximately 18 billion USD for the areas sponsored by Nauru and Tonga. The assessments also suggest that extraction of the first minerals could take place as early as 2027. However, this projection should be interpreted with considerable caution. The Metals Company makes it clear that these assessments rely on a series of assumptions regarding technological feasibility, regulatory permissions, and future market prices. Moreover, researchers question whether deep sea minerals can be lifted to the surface in a commercially profitable way at all, and there is no scientific consensus on the economic viability of large scale extraction.

According to the most recent assessment from 2025, the following 5 SIDS have entered into agreements or sponsorship arrangements related to early-stage deep-sea mining companies in the Clarion-Clipperton Zone:

SIDS	Contractor / agreement	Type of relationship	Mineral resource
Cook Islands	Cobalt Seabed Resources Ltd. (CSR) Joint venture between Cook Islands Investment Corporation (CIIC) and GSR (Belgium)	Joint venture + ISA exploration contract	Polymetallic Nodules
Kiribati	Marawa Research and Development (state-owned entity) with service and option agreements with DeepGreen Engineering (The Metals Company subsidiary)	Service agreement + Option agreement	Polymetallic Nodules
Nauru	Nauru Ocean Resources Inc. (NORI) Partnership with The Metals Company	Full sponsorship agreement	Polymetallic Nodules
Tonga	Tonga Offshore Mining Ltd. (TOML) Partnership with The Metals Company	Sponsorship agreement nearly identical to Nauru	Polymetallic Nodules
Jamaica	Blue Minerals Jamaica Partnership with Blue Minerals Switzerland (Allseas Group)	Sponsorship certificate (not public)	Polymetallic Nodules

A total of five Small Island Developing States (SIDS) currently sponsor exploration activities in the Clarion-Clipperton Zone (CCZ): the Cook Islands, Kiribati, Nauru, Tonga, and Jamaica. Although all five states play a role in enabling access to seabed minerals in this region, they do so through very different institutional arrangements and with varying degrees of legal and financial exposure.

The overview shows that the Cook Islands have adopted a comparatively state-led model through a joint-venture structure, which provides them with greater regulatory control and fewer investor constraints. In contrast, Nauru and Tonga rely on sponsorship agreements with subsidiaries of The Metals Company that include strong investor-protection mechanisms, potentially limiting their policy flexibility and increasing the risk of investor-tate disputes. Kiribati’s participation is organized through a state-owned enterprise whose contractual arrangements with DeepGreen were terminated in 2024, leaving the country formally present in the CCZ but without an active commercial partner. Jamaica, meanwhile, sponsors a subsidiary of Blue Minerals Switzerland and faces distinctive risks due to the absence of domestic deep-sea mining legislation combined with binding bilateral investment treaties.

=== Opportunities for SIDS in deep-sea mining ===
The technological and political developments in deep-sea mining mean that many SIDS gain access to resources on a scale previously unavailable. SIDS have acted as economic maximalist in terms of the tendency to claim areas as their own when there is an economic gain to be made. Technological developments make it possible to extract these materials and resources at faster pace. In recent years we are seeing an increasing account of SIDS claiming maritime areas and their resources.

Since many of these SIDS possess potentially valuable Exclusive Economic Zones (EEZ), there is significant interest from both major countries and corporations in developing the production and extraction of these minerals and resources from the seabed. This interest means that many members of the Global South and developing states, such as SIDS, find themselves in a favorable negotiating position with the potential to boost their economies. In this context, they are brought into contact with multinational corporations and powerful states that show interest in their resources. For countries that have previously experienced limited resources and export opportunities, this is a situation that holds the possibility and potential to propel their nations toward a brighter future.

However, there is not a single one of these SIDS that is strong enough to stand on its own and negotiate with either larger nations or multinational corporations alone. Therefore, it is also observed that, despite their limited landmass and economic capacity, SIDS are pivotal actors in the International Seabed Authority (ISA) and other supranational organisations, sponsoring exploration contracts, shaping governance debates, and reframing how the global commons are managed. Despite their relatively small landmasses, these countries have a strong interest in ensuring that the surrounding areas are not exploited or extracted without their involvement. These nations are deeply dependent on the potential of the seabed, as in many cases it constitutes the vast majority of their economic potential. Therefore, international cooperation is not just an option but a necessity for these states. A stronger ISA will make it easier for them to stand up to foreign powers and corporations that seek to profit at their expense.

Through their engagement in the ISA, these states focus particularly on three articles in the United Nations Convention on the Law of the Sea (UNCLOS), the UN’s international law governing the oceans. A central dimension of the political agency of SIDS in deep-sea mining governance lies in their ability to draw on different parts of UNCLOS. Two distinct legal regimes are particularly significant: the regime governing The Area, which refers to the seabed beyond national jurisdiction, and the regime governing the EEZ. Together these regimes shape the formal authority, political leverage, and environmental responsibilities of SIDS within global ocean governance.

The regime governing The Area is articulated most clearly in Articles 136, 137(2), and 145. Article 136 establishes that the deep seabed and its resources constitute the common heritage of mankind, a principle that underpins the ISA mandate to ensure collective benefit sharing. Article 137(2) specifies that no state may claim sovereignty or exclusive rights over resources in The Area, which creates a legal barrier against unilateral appropriation by powerful states and corporations. Article 145 requires the protection of the marine environment from harmful effects of mineral exploitation. Together these provisions create a governance architecture in which SIDS can appeal to international law to justify claims to participation, oversight, and equitable benefit distribution in deep-sea mining. They allow SIDS to argue that their lack of economic or technological capacity does not preclude them from having a voice in decisions that affect the global commons, reinforcing the broader Global South emphasis on equity and sovereignty.

However, the legal position of SIDS does not depend solely on The Area. The second foundational regime is the EEZ, defined primarily through Articles 55 to 57, and especially Article 56. These provisions grant coastal states exclusive sovereign rights to explore, exploit, manage, and conserve natural resources within two hundred nautical miles of their shorelines. For SIDS, these zones are extraordinarily large relative to their land area. Some island states possess EEZs thousands of times larger than their terrestrial territory, a reality that has contributed to the political discourse of SIDS as Large Ocean States. The EEZ regime thus represents a major source of both economic potential and environmental responsibility, providing these states with a legally recognized spatial domain in which they can assert considerable authority.

Although the EEZ regime and the regime of The Area operate under different legal principles, they intersect in important political, ecological, and strategic ways. Deep-sea mining activities in The Area can have ecological spillover effects that reach well into national jurisdictions, particularly due to ecological connectivity across mid ocean ridges and abyssal plains. For SIDS, whose economies and food security often depend heavily on marine ecosystems, these spillovers heighten the importance of the environmental protections outlined in Article 145. At the same time, the principles embedded in Articles 136 and 137(2) support SIDS in making claims for increased transparency, environmental safeguards, financial compensation mechanisms, and technological capacity building within the ISA system, since these articles mandate that the benefits of the global commons are to be shared equitably.

The combination of these two legal regimes therefore plays a crucial role in how SIDS navigate global ocean politics. Their EEZ rights provide them with concrete sovereign authority over vast ocean spaces, strengthening their position in regional fisheries, conservation policies, and blue economy initiatives. Meanwhile, their participation in The Area’s governance enables them to influence decisions about deep sea mining beyond their national borders and to articulate broader Global South concerns regarding justice, environmental protection, and postcolonial vulnerability. In this dual framework, SIDS emerge not merely as small or vulnerable states, but as states whose legal entitlements under UNCLOS grant them both territorial authority and normative leverage. Their EEZs anchor their identity as stewards of large ocean territories, while the principles governing The Area enable them to challenge inequitable distributions of power and benefit in the governance of the global commons. Together, these regimes form the basis for the political strategies through which SIDS seek to shape the governance of deep-sea mining in ways that reflect their development priorities, environmental concerns, and long standing struggles for recognition within international law. In this sense, deep-sea mining has been presented as a tool to narrow global economic inequalities, offering resource-dependent island states a stake in an emerging industry otherwise dominated by developed economies.

=== Challenges and risks associated with deep-sea mining ===
While deep-sea mining holds the promise of substantial economic gains for SIDS, it is not without significant structural and legal risks. Most SIDS lack the technological capacity, financial resources, and institutional infrastructure to undertake deep-sea extraction independently. Under the legal framework of UNCLOS, participation in activities in The Area is restricted to states, state enterprises, or private entities that are formally sponsored by a state (UNCLOS Article 153(2)(b); Annex III, Article 4). As a consequence, some SIDS have established their own state-owned enterprises in order to act as the official sponsoring entities for private corporations. This has been the case for Nauru, Tonga, and Kiribati, which created Nauru Ocean Resources Inc., Tonga Offshore Mining Limited, and Marawa Research and Exploration Ltd., respectively, to meet ISA requirements for sponsorship.

Because SIDS do not possess the capacity to conduct extraction themselves, these state-owned enterprises function primarily as legal intermediaries that enable partnerships with multinational corporations or larger states possessing the necessary expertise, capital, and equipment. The industry is already highly concentrated, dominated by a small number of corporate operators due to extremely high technological and financial barriers to entry. As a result, when SIDS enter this sector, they often confront asymmetrical negotiations with a few highly powerful corporate actors. Their limited experience with large scale contract management or natural resource governance further weakens their bargaining position. This imbalance produces a considerable risk that SIDS may accept agreements that undervalue their natural resources, diminish their regulatory autonomy, or create long term dependencies that echo earlier patterns of colonial extraction. Their vulnerability is not only economic but also institutional. Postcolonial legacies, constrained administrative capacity, and fragile regulatory structures leave SIDS highly exposed to the influence of powerful corporate and state backed actors in this emerging industry. In this context, the legal requirement to sponsor deep-sea mining companies places a disproportionate burden on SIDS, who must assume the liabilities of sponsorship while lacking the leverage to shape outcomes on equal terms.

SIDS are particularly vulnerable in negotiations due to the slow, fragmented, and politically contested development of common guidelines on deep-sea mining by the ISA. The ongoing negotiations over the Mining Code, which is still incomplete after more than a decade, create a regulatory gap in which key issues such as environmental thresholds, liability, benefit sharing, and enforcement mechanisms remain uncertain. This legal uncertainty disproportionately affects SIDS, who often lack the diplomatic capacity, in-house legal expertise, and scientific infrastructure needed to navigate such emerging governance regimes. In the absence of finalized ISA rules, SIDS are frequently left to negotiate bilateral contracts and joint ventures directly with multinational corporations, most of which have far greater financial resources, legal teams, and technical knowledge. This structural asymmetry increases the risk that SIDS may accept contractual terms that expose them to long-term liabilities or grant excessive influence to companies over national decision-making.

== Remittances ==
Remittances are payments made in foreign countries, contributing to household income in home nations. It is particularly prevalent in SIDS as many workers see better income, migrating for work purposes.

For example, in Haiti, many locals travel to countries such as the Dominican Republic and the United States for work. This is because Haiti's population has an average income of less than $2.50 a day, which is below the poverty line of $3 a day set by the World Bank, whereas the average daily salary is $31 and $250 in the Dominican Republic and the United States, respectively.

This lack of available income is due to the dire economic, social, and political circumstances within the country. Mainly caused by the fact Haiti is on a Fault Line between the Caribbean plate and North American plate, so sees earthquakes occurring regularly, harming its infrastructure. Continually, politics in Haiti remains unstable, their president Jovenel Moïse was assassinated in 2021. And to this day, Haiti sees one of the highest corruption rates in the world.

== See also ==
- 2010 United Nations Climate Change Conference
- Organisation of African, Caribbean and Pacific States (OACPS)
- Group of 77
- Islands First (environmental organization)
- Landlocked developing countries
- List of island countries
- Alliance of Small Island States
